= Cardiff Council elections =

Local elections held in Cardiff, Wales

Cardiff Council elections take place for the whole council every five years, to Cardiff Council (officially the County Council of the City and County of Cardiff) in south Wales. It came into being as a unitary authority on 1 April 1996, after the passing of the Local Government (Wales) Act 1994. In 2014 the National Assembly for Wales deferred all local elections in Wales to 2017. The council is composed of 75 councillors.

Between 1974 and 1996 Cardiff Council was a district council of South Glamorgan (the city also electing councillors to the county council). Prior to 1974 Cardiff Council governed a county borough, separate from the county of Glamorgan.

== Political control ==
Since the current council was established as a unitary authority in 1995, political control has been held by the following parties:

Party in control		Party in minority lead	
Labour	1995–2004		
No overall control	2004–2012	Liberal Democrats	2004–2012
Labour	2012-		

=== Leadership ===
The leaders of Cardiff Council since 1996 have been:

Councillor	Party	From	To
Russell Goodway	Labour	1 April 1996	1 Jul 2004
Rodney Berman	Liberal Democrats	1 Jul 2004	6 May 2012
Heather Joyce	Labour	17 May 2012	27 Mar 2014
Phil Bale	Labour	27 Mar 2014	25 May 2017
Huw Thomas	Labour	25 May 2017	

== Council elections ==
- 1987 Cardiff City Council election
- 1991 Cardiff City Council election
- 1995 Cardiff Council election
- 1999 Cardiff Council election
- 2004 Cardiff Council election
- 2008 Cardiff Council election
- 2012 Cardiff Council election
- 2017 Cardiff Council election
- 2022 Cardiff Council election

== City result maps ==
election results
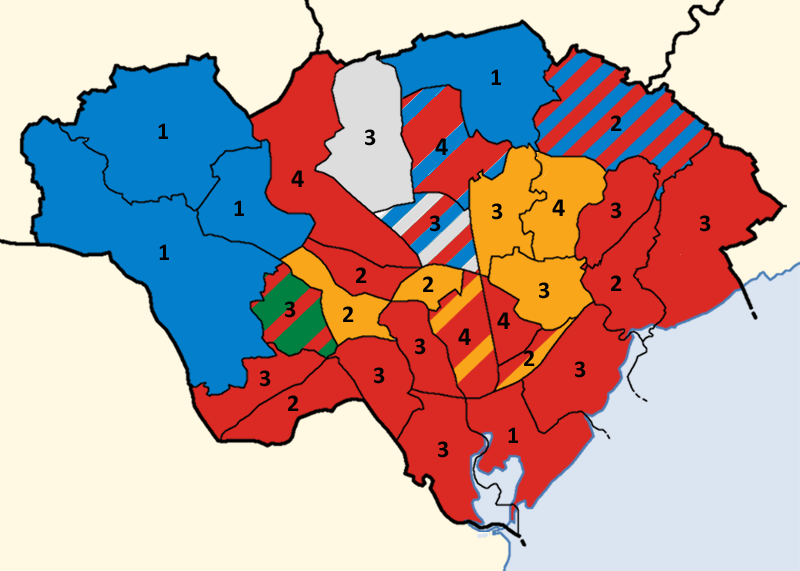
2012 results map

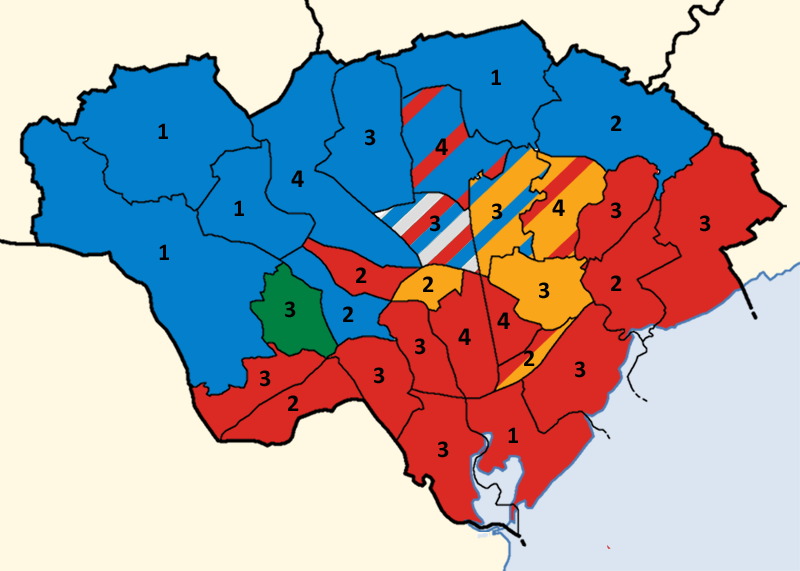
2017 results map

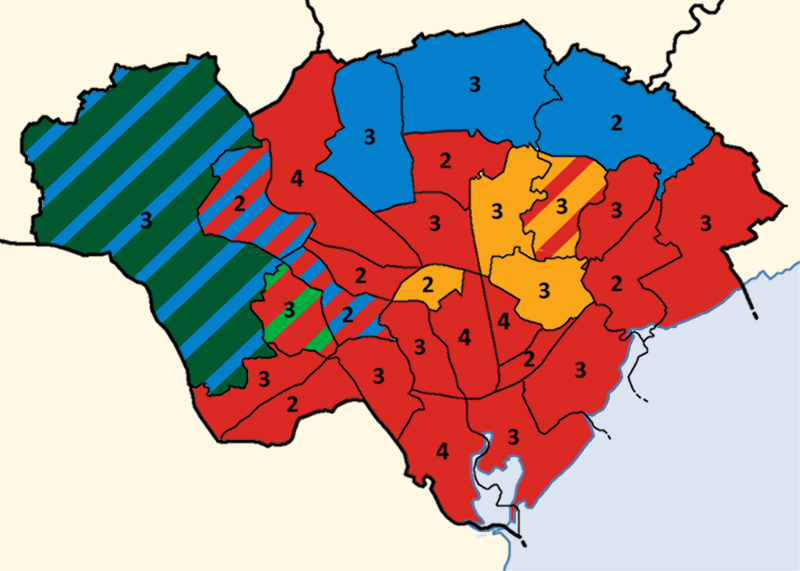
2022 results map

== By-election results ==
=== 1995–1999 ===
==== Fairwater ====
Fairwater by-election, 10 April 1997
Party	Candidate	Votes	%	±%
Labour	Michael Michael	1,527	70.9	−1.5
Conservative		388	18.0	+6.7
Liberal Democrats		237	11.0	+1.2
Majority		1,139	52.9	N/A
Turnout				
Registered electors				
Labour hold		Swing		

==== Plasnewydd ====
Plasnewydd by-election, 18 September 1997
Party	Candidate	Votes	%	±%
Labour	Geoff Mungham	1,944	46.3	−9.9
Liberal Democrats		1,398	33.3	+21.5
Conservative		457	10.9	+3.9
Green		260	6.2	−3.9
Socialist Labour		140	3.3	N/A
Majority		546	13.0	N/A
Turnout			30.3	−4.9
Registered electors				
Labour hold		Swing		

The by-election was called following the election of Cllr. Julie Morgan as the Member for the Parliamentary constituency of Cardiff North.

==== Rhiwbina ====
Rhiwbina by-election, 3 September 1998
Party	Candidate	Votes	%	±%
Conservative	Gareth Neale	1,881	45.5	+9.7
Labour		1,096	26.5	−14.5
Liberal Democrats		966	23.3	+9.0
Plaid Cymru		189	4.5	−0.9
Majority		785	19.0	N/A
Turnout			43.3	−11.2
Registered electors				
Conservative gain from Labour		Swing		

=== 1999–2004 ===
==== Cyncoed ====
Cyncoed by-election, 30 November 2000
Party	Candidate	Votes	%	±%
Liberal Democrats	David Rees	1,902	54.3	+1.0
Conservative		1,132	32.3	+12.7
Labour		271	7.7	−5.6
Majority		770	22.0	N/A
Turnout			39.8	−19.4
Registered electors				
Liberal Democrats hold		Swing		

The by-election was called following the resignation of Cllr. Jenny Randerson.

==== Canton ====
Canton by-election, 7 June 2001
Party	Candidate	Votes	%	±%
Labour	Ramesh Patel	3,130	48.0	+9.2
Conservative		1,266	19.4	+6.1
Plaid Cymru		1,170	18.0	−18.8
Liberal Democrats		950	14.6	+9.2
Majority		1,960	28.6	N/A
Turnout				
Registered electors				
Labour hold		Swing		

The by-election was called following the election of Cllr. Kevin Brennan as the Member for the Parliamentary constituency of Cardiff West.

==== Llandaff North ====
Llandaff North by-election, 7 June 2001
Party	Candidate	Votes	%	±%
Labour	C. Bewes	2,115	57.1	+2.1
Conservative		664	17.9	+3.6
Liberal Democrats		566	15.3	+1.6
Plaid Cymru		362	9.8	−7.2
Majority		1,549	39.2	N/A
Turnout				
Registered electors				
Labour hold		Swing		

==== Gabalfa ====
Gabalfa by-election, 7 February 2002
Party	Candidate	Votes	%	±%
Liberal Democrats	Cathy Pearcy	925	55.3	+31.5
Labour		451	26.9	−10.3
Conservative		138	8.2	−6.9
Plaid Cymru		116	6.9	−16.9
Socialist Alliance		44	2.6	N/A
Majority		474	28.4	N/A
Turnout			25.0	−11.0
Registered electors				
Liberal Democrats gain from Labour		Swing		

==== Pentwyn ====
Pentwyn by-election, 11 September 2003
Party	Candidate	Votes	%	±%
Liberal Democrats	Judith Woodman	1,836	66.5	+31.4
Labour	Luke Holland	673	24.4	−17.5
Conservative		169	6.1	−3.7
Socialist Alliance		81	2.9	N/A
Majority		1,163	42.1	N/A
Turnout			28.9	−8.9
Registered electors				
Liberal Democrats hold		Swing		

The by-election was called following the resignation of Cllr. Bill Cookson.

=== 2004–2008 ===
There were no by-elections.

=== 2008–2012 ===
==== Pentyrch ====
Pentyrch by-election, 31 July 2008
Party	Candidate	Votes	%	±%
Conservative	Craig Williams	554	41.9	+7.5
Labour	Christine Priday	542	41.0	+10.2
Plaid Cymru	Ian Hughes	129	9.8	−10.0
Liberal Democrats	Alexandria Evans	97	7.3	−0.6
Majority		12	0.9	N/A
Turnout			48.2	−2.6
Registered electors				
Conservative hold		Swing	-1.3	

The by-election was called following the resignation of Cllr. Simon Roberts.

==== Riverside ====
Riverside by-election, 3 March 2011
Party	Candidate	Votes	%	±%
Labour	Iona Gordon	1,700	46.8	+14.4
Plaid Cymru	Steve Garrett	1,099	30.3	−13.6
Conservative	James Roach	369	10.2	−2.0
Green	Yvan Maurel	277	7.6	N/A
Liberal Democrats	Gwilym Owen	187	5.1	−6.4
Majority		601	16.5	N/A
Turnout		3,655	39.8	−0.1
Registered electors		9,188		
Labour gain from Plaid Cymru		Swing		

The by-election was called following the resignation of Cllr. Gwenllian Lansdown.

=== 2012–2017 ===
==== Riverside ====
Riverside by-election, 5 December 2013
Party	Candidate	Votes	%	±%
Labour	Darren Williams	1,120	50.3	+3.6
Plaid Cymru	Elizabeth Gould	773	34.7	+3.6
Conservative	Aled Crow	107	4.8	−2.9
UKIP	Simon Zeigler	97	4.4	N/A
TUSC	Christopher Beer	70	3.1	+0.5
Liberal Democrats	Sian Donne	58	2.6	−1.2
Majority		347	15.6	±0.0
Turnout		2,225	22.6	−14.6
Registered electors		9,860		
Labour hold		Swing		

The by-election was caused by the resignation of Labour councillor Phil Hawkins for personal reasons.

==== Splott ====
Splott by-election, 5 December 2013
Party	Candidate	Votes	%	±%
Labour	Edward Stubbs	706	39.1	−8.7
Liberal Democrats	Jamie Matthews	604	33.5	+3.5
UKIP	George Morris	209	11.6	N/A
Independent	Elys John	94	5.2	N/A
Conservative	Daniel Mason	86	4.8	+0.5
TUSC	Katrine Williams	80	6.1	+3.2
Majority		102	5.6	−12.3
Turnout		1,779	18.1	−15.4
Registered electors		9,846		
Labour hold		Swing		

A by-election was caused by the resignation of Labour councillor Luke Holland following accusations of non-attendance at council meetings. He stated that he planned to move to London.

==== Canton ====
Canton by-election, 21 February 2014
Party	Candidate	Votes	%	±%
Labour	Susan Elsmore	1,201	41.7	−5.9
Plaid Cymru	Elin Tudur	972	33.7	+14.3
Conservative	Pamela Richards	381	13.2	+2.4
Green	David Griffiths	148	5.1	−10.5
TUSC	Steffan Bateman	101	3.5	+1.6
Liberal Democrats	Matthew Hemsley	80	2.8	+0.3
Majority		229	8.0	−20.2
Turnout		2,883	24.3	−17.0
Registered electors		11,915		
Labour hold		Swing		

The by-election was caused by the resignation of Labour Councillor Cerys Furlong on 30 December 2013.

==== Llandaff North ====
Llandaff North by-election, 2 October 2014
Party	Candidate	Votes	%	±%
Labour	Susan White	898	50.1	+2.7
Independent	David Coggins-Cogan	419	23.4	+0.2
UKIP	Simon Zeigler	204	11.4	N/A
Conservative	Peter Hudson	136	7.6	+1.7
Liberal Democrats	Ann Rowland-James	134	7.5	−6.8
Majority		479	26.7	+2.5
Turnout		1,791	30.0	−12.7
Registered electors		5,991		
Labour hold		Swing		

The by-election was caused by the resignation of Labour councillor Siobhan Corria for personal reasons.

==== Pentyrch ====
Pentyrch by-election, 30 June 2015
Party	Candidate	Votes	%	±%
Conservative	Gavin Hill-John	561	40.5	−12.5
Plaid Cymru	Hywel Wigley	543	39.2	+26.7
Labour	Paul Fisher	234	16.9	−13.4
Independent	Munawar Mughal	24	1.7	N/A
Green	Ruth Osner	22	1.6	−1.3
Liberal Democrats	Cadan ap Tomos	10	0.7	−0.9
Majority		18	1.3	−24.0
Turnout		1,394	49.9	−2.4
Registered electors		2,800		
Conservative hold		Swing		

The by-election was caused by the resignation of Labour Councillor Craig Williams, following his election as MP for Cardiff North.

==== Riverside ====
Riverside by-election, 7 October 2015
Party	Candidate	Votes	%	±%
Labour	Caro Wild	1,071	45.9	−0.8
Plaid Cymru	Ruksana Begum	780	33.5	+2.3
Conservative	Sean Driscoll	155	6.6	−1.1
UKIP	Gareth Bennett	110	4.7	N/A
Green	Hannah Pudner	109	4.7	−3.3
Liberal Democrats	Gwilym Owen	85	3.6	−0.2
TUSC	Steffan Bateman	21	0.9	−1.8
Majority		291	12.4	−3.2
Turnout		2,331	23.9	−13.3
Registered electors		9,758		
Labour hold		Swing		

The by-election was caused by the resignation of Labour councillor Cecilia Love for family reasons.

==== Plasnewydd ====
Plasnewydd by-election, 20 September 2016
Party	Candidate	Votes	%	±%
Liberal Democrats	Robin Rea	1,258	48.1	+16.9
Labour	Peter Wong	910	34.8	−0.3
Plaid Cymru	Glenn Page	177	6.8	−4.8
Conservative	Munawar Mughal	115	4.4	−5.5
Green	Michael Cope	93	3.6	−8.7
UKIP	Lawrence Gwynn	62	2.4	N/A
Majority		348	13.3	N/A
Turnout		2,615	23.1	−4.6
Registered electors		11,356		
Liberal Democrats gain from Labour		Swing		

The by-election was caused by the death of Labour councillor Mohammed Javed.

==== Grangetown ====
Grangetown by-election, 3 November 2016
Party	Candidate	Votes	%	±%
Plaid Cymru	Tariq Awan	1,163	42.0	+8.5
Labour	Maliika Kaaba	1,049	37.9	−2.2
Conservative	Michael Bryan	287	10.4	+3.5
UKIP	Richard Lewis	141	5.1	N/A
Liberal Democrats	Asghar Ali	127	4.6	−6.6
Majority		114	4.1	N/A
Turnout		2,767	21.7	−12.4
Registered electors		12,754		
Plaid Cymru gain from Labour		Swing		

The by-election was caused by the death of Labour councillor Chris Lomax.

=== 2017–2022 ===
==== Ely ====
Ely by-election, 21 February 2019
Party	Candidate	Votes	%	±%
Plaid Cymru	Andrea Gibson	831	43.1	+17.8
Labour	Irene Humphreys	779	40.4	−7.1
Liberal Democrats	Richard Jerrett	46	2.4	−6.2
Conservative	Gavin Brookman	271	14.1	−2.4
Majority		52	2.7	N/A
Turnout		1,927	20.3	−9.2
Registered electors		9,482		
Plaid Cymru gain from Labour		Swing		

The by-election was caused by the death of Labour councillor Jim Murphy on 1 December 2018.

==== Cyncoed ====
Cyncoed by-election 16 July 2019
Party	Candidate	Votes	%	±%
Liberal Democrats	Robert Hopkins	1,920	55.3	+18.9
Conservative	Peter Hudson	838	24.1	−11.9
Labour	Madhu Khanna-Davies	560	16.1	−3.3
Plaid Cymru	Morgan Rogers	152	4.4	N/A
Majority		1,082	31.1	+13.4
Turnout		3,484	42.1	−1.2
Registered electors		8,268		
Liberal Democrats hold		Swing	+15.4	

The by-election was caused by the death of Liberal Democrat Councillor Wendy Congreve on 14 May 2019.

==== Whitchurch & Tongwynlais ====
Whitchurch & Tongwynlais by-election 3 October 2019
Party	Candidate	Votes	%	±%
Conservative	Mia Rees	1,544	36.4	−4.5
Labour	Marc Palmer	1,190	28.0	−10.0
Plaid Cymru	Dan Allsobrook	674	15.9	+2.3
Liberal Democrats	Sian Donne	588	13.9	+6.3
Green	David Griffin	248	5.8	−2.3
Majority		354	8.4	+3.2
Turnout		4,244	33.7	−11.7
Registered electors		12,589		
Conservative hold		Swing	+2.7	

The by-election was caused by the death of Conservative councillor Tim Davies on 4 June 2019.

==== Llanishen ====
Llanishen by-election 21 November 2019
Party	Candidate	Votes	%	±%
Conservative	Siân-Elin Melbourne	1,566	43.4	+6.3
Labour	Irene Humphreys	1,254	34.7	−1.2
Liberal Democrats	Will Ogborne	387	10.7	+3.1
Plaid Cymru	Chris Haines	209	5.8	−2.7
Green	Michael Cope	138	3.8	−3.0
Independent	Lawrence Gwynn	59	1.6	N/A
Majority		312	8.7	N/A
Turnout		3,613	27.3	−18.9
Registered electors		13,227		
Conservative gain from Labour		Swing		

The by-election was caused by the resignation of Labour councillor Phil Bale in Autumn 2019.

==== Heath ====
Heath by-election, 11 November 2021
Party	Candidate	Votes	%	±%
Labour	Julie Sangani	1,729	47.1	+16.1
Conservative	Peter Hudson	1,128	30.8	+2.5
Liberal Democrats	Kathryn Lock	561	15.3	+11.5
Plaid Cymru	Steve Garrett	250	6.8	+0.5
Majority		599	16.3	N/A
Turnout		3,668	38.2	−16.9
Registered electors		9,596		
Labour gain from Heath Independent		Swing		

The by-election was called following the resignation of Cllr. Fenella Bowden who resigned for health reasons.

=== 2022–2026 ===
==== Grangetown (2024) ====
Grangetown by-election, 25 April 2024
Party	Candidate	Votes	%	±%
Labour	Waheeda Abdul Sattar	1,470	47.5	N/A
Common Ground	Kirstie Kopetzki	573	18.5	N/A
Conservative	Zak Weaver	387	12.5	N/A
Propel	Sash Patel	292	9.4	N/A
Independent	Ahmed Abdillahi Abdi Samater	205	6.6	N/A
Liberal Democrats	James Bear	123	4.0	N/A
Independent	Andrew Hovord	44	1.4	N/A
Majority		897	29.0	N/A
Turnout		3,049	20.3	−15.5
Registered electors				
Labour hold		Swing		

The by-election was caused by the death of Labour councillor Abdul Sattar on 15 February 2024.

==== Splott (2024) ====
Splott by-election: 5 December 2024
Party	Candidate	Votes	%	±%
Labour	Anny Anderson	711	34.0	N/A
Green	Sam Coates	362	17.3	N/A
Propel	Kyle Cullen	305	14.6	N/A
Liberal Democrats	Cadan ap Tomos	292	14.0	N/A
Reform	Lee Canning	271	13.0	N/A
Plaid Cymru	Leticia Gonzalez	88	4.2	N/A
Conservative	Tomos Llewelyn	60	2.9	N/A
Majority		349	16.7	N/A
Turnout		2,094	19.5	–11.8
Registered electors		10,762		
Labour hold		Swing	▼17.4	

The by-election was caused by the death of Labour councillor Jane Henshaw on 22/23 September 2024.

Her daughter succeeded her as Councillor.

==== Llanrumney (2025) ====
Llanrumney by-election, 24 July 2025
Party	Candidate	Votes	%	±%
Labour	Lexi Joanna Pocknell	755	39.4	N/A
Reform	Sidney Malik	630	32.9	N/A
Liberal Democrats	Wayne Street	281	14.7	N/A
Plaid Cymru	Joseph Oscar Gnagbo	138	7.2	N/A
Conservative	Ffin Elliott	64	3.3	N/A
Green	David Fitzpatrick	47	2.5	N/A
Majority		125	6.5	N/A
Turnout		1,915	24.0	−1.0
Registered electors		8,064		
Labour hold		Swing	▼20.6	

The by-election was caused by the resignation, for health reasons, of Labour councillor Heather Joyce, after representing Llanrumney for 17 years.

==== Grangetown (2025) ====
Grangetown by-election, 14 August 2025
Party	Candidate	Votes	%	±%
Green	Matt Youde	818	24.4	N/A
Labour	Khuram Chowdhry	774	23.1	N/A
Plaid Cymru	Neil Roberts	639	19.1	N/A
Reform	Joseph Martin	495	13.0	N/A
Propel	Vincent Yewlett	327	9.8	N/A
Independent	Ahmed Samater	158	4.7	N/A
Conservative	James Hamblin	139	4.1	N/A
Liberal Democrats	Irfan Latif	63	1.8	N/A
Majority		44	1.3	N/A
Turnout		3,411	26.7	−9.1
Registered electors		12,754		
Green gain from Labour		Swing		

The by-election was caused by the resignation of Labour councillor, Sara Robinson.

==== Trowbridge (2025) ====
Trowbridge by-election: 18 September 2025
Party	Candidate	Votes	%	±%
Reform	Edward Topham	1,142	39.6	N/A
Liberal Democrats	Chris Cogger	681	23.6	N/A
Labour	Gary Bowen-Thomson	615	21.3	N/A
Plaid Cymru	Carol Falcon	223	7.7	N/A
Conservative	Joe Roberts	90	3.1	N/A
Green	Jessica Ryan	67	2.3	N/A
Propel	Leanne Lennox	63	2.2	
Majority		527	16.0	N/A
Turnout		2,881		
Registered electors		11,663		
Reform gain from Labour		Swing		

There were 9 rejected ballot papers. 8 unmarked or void for uncertainty and one for voting for more than one candidate.

The by-election was caused by the resignation of Labour councillor, Chris Lay.

==== Splott (2026) ====
Splott by-election: 9 July 2026
Party	Candidate	Votes	%	±%
Labour	James Caruana	765	40.1	N/A
Green	Simran Patel	678	35.5	N/A
Reform	David John Cook	286	15.0	N/A
Liberal Democrats	Rhys William Husband	114	6.0	N/A
Conservative	Charles Agbakahi	54	2.8	N/A
Majority		87	4.6	N/A
Turnout		1,907	17.7	–1.8
Registered electors		10,762		
Labour hold		Swing		

The by-election was called following the election of Cardiff Council leader, Huw Thomas, to the Senedd in May 2026.

== See also ==
- 1889 Cardiff County Borough Council election
