= 2008 Cardiff Council election =

Local election in Cardiff, Wales

2008 Cardiff County and City Council election
- 1 May 2008

All 75 seats to Cardiff Council 38 seats needed for a majority
	First party	Second party	Third party
Leader	Rodney Berman	David Walker	Greg Owens
Party	Liberal Democrats	Conservative	Labour
Leader's seat	Plasnewydd	Lisvane	Llandaff
Seats won	35/75	17/75	13/73
Seat change	▲2	▲4	▼13
Popular vote	66,940	70,238	68,973
	Fourth party	Fifth party
Leader	Neil McEvoy	Adrian Robson
Party	Plaid Cymru	Rhiwbina Independents
Leader's seat	Fairwater	Rhiwbina
Seats won	7/54	3/3
Seat change	▲4	▲3
Popular vote	32,120	10,004 (Rhiwbina)
- Map showing the results of the 2008 City of Cardiff Council Elections.
Council control before election
Lib Dem Minority
Council control after election
Lib Dem / Plaid Cymru Coalition

The 2008 Cardiff Council election was held on 1 May, along with the 2008 Welsh local elections. All 75 seats of Cardiff Council were contested, with it remaining in no overall control. It was preceded by the 2004 election and followed by the 2012 election

== Overview ==
Candidates from nine parties as well as Independents stood for election. Of these Liberal Democrat, Conservative, Labour, Plaid Cymru and Independent councillors were elected.

Cardiff Council Election 2008^{[A]}
Party	Seats	Gains	Losses	Net gain/loss	Seats %	Votes %	Votes	+/−
Liberal Democrats	35	5	3	+2	46.7	26.2	66,940	
Conservative	17	7	3	+4	22.7	27.5	70,238	
Labour	13	1	14	-13	17.3	27.0	68,973	
Plaid Cymru	7	4	0	+4	9.3	12.6	32,120	
Independent	3	3	0	+3	4.0	4.6	11,685	
Green	0	0	0	±0.0	0.0	1.5	3,784	
Socialist Alliance	0	0	0	±0.0	0.0	0.2	632	
UKIP	0	0	0	±0.0	0.0	0.1	398	
Communist	0	0	0	±0.0	0.0	0.1	310	
Left Alliance	0	0	0	±0.0	0.0	0.0	91	

^{A} The changes in party councillors in this table differs from that list by the BBC because it is based purely on changes from the 2004 election, not taking into account mid-term party defections or by-elections

=== Outcome ===
After this election the council remained in no overall control with the Liberal Democrats remaining the largest party on the council, after a net gain of seats. All parties gained seats, other than Labour who halved their seat share from the previous election. Three Independents were elected for the first time since 1999, although two of these were former Conservative councillors that defected during the previous term.

The Liberal Democrats formed a coalition with the Plaid Cymru group to lead the council; Liberal Democrat Rodney Berman became council leader, with Neil McEvoy of Plaid Cymru and Judith Woodman of the Liberal Democrats becoming deputy leaders. The Conservative Party emerged as the official opposition on the council, after they became the second largest party.

== Ward results ==
The ward results listed below are based on the changes from the 2004 elections, not taking into account any mid-term by-elections or party defections.

* = sitting councillor in this ward prior to election

=== Adamsdown (2 seats) ===
Adamsdown
Party	Candidate	Votes	%	±%
Liberal Democrats	Nigel Howells *	925	53.3	−5.7
Liberal Democrats	John Dixon *	891		
Labour	Sarah Merry	431	24.8	+6.5
Labour	Peter Payne	383		
Conservative	Julie Jenkins	160	9.2	N/A
Conservative	Mary Newman	151		
Socialist	David Bartlett	98	5.6	N/A
Plaid Cymru	Fran Rawlings	66	3.8	−6.6
The Left Party	Joe Redmond	55	3.2	N/A
Turnout		1,660	27.2	−3.6
Registered electors		6,106		
Liberal Democrats hold		Swing		
Liberal Democrats hold		Swing		

=== Butetown (1 seat) ===
Butetown
Party	Candidate	Votes	%	±%
Liberal Democrats	Delme Greening	708	40.8	+17.4
Labour	H. Vaughan Gething *	594	34.2	+3.3
Conservative	Maria Hill	294	16.9	+7.7
Independent	Ben Foday	103	5.9	−24.8
The Left Party	Karen Tyre	36	2.1	N/A
Turnout		1,750	28.9	−2.6
Registered electors		6,052		
Liberal Democrats gain from Labour		Swing		

=== Caerau (2 seats) ===
Caerau
Party	Candidate	Votes	%	±%
Liberal Democrats	Jacqui Gasson *	1,176	48.5	+2.8
Liberal Democrats	Roger Burley *	1,091		
Labour	Harry Ernest	750	30.9	−3.0
Labour	Maliika Kaaba	584		
Conservative	Alec Burns	285	11.8	+0.6
Conservative	Clive Williams	255		
Plaid Cymru	John Garland	213	8.8	−0.5
Plaid Cymru	Tomos Evans	178		
Turnout		2,327	31.6	+3.6
Registered electors		7,356		
Liberal Democrats hold		Swing		
Liberal Democrats hold		Swing		

=== Canton (3 seats) ===
Canton
Party	Candidate	Votes	%	±%
Labour	Ramesh Patel *	1,814	36.6	−0.5
Labour	Richard Cook *	1,580		
Labour	Cerys Furlong	1,497		
Plaid Cymru	Elin Tudur	1,257	25.3	−3.3
Plaid Cymru	Colin Nosworthy	1,170		
Plaid Cymru	Numan Ahmed	1,113		
Conservative	Pamela Richards	858	17.3	−3.5
Conservative	Harold Burns	820		
Conservative	Andrew Sweet	813		
Green	Jake Griffiths	515	10.4	N/A
Green	Carys Williams	411		
Green	Jane Richards	396		
Liberal Democrats	Andrew Owen	361	7.3	−12.8
Liberal Democrats	Keith Clements	331		
Liberal Democrats	Alastair Sloan	224		
Socialist	Lianne Francis	158	3.2	N/A
Turnout		4,660	44.2	+2.4
Registered electors		10,534		
Labour hold		Swing		
Labour hold		Swing		
Labour hold		Swing		

=== Cathays (4 seats) ===
Cathays
Party	Candidate	Votes	%	±%
Liberal Democrats	Jonathan Aylwin *	1,114	42.4	−11.1
Liberal Democrats	Simon Pickard	1,051		
Liberal Democrats	Elizabeth Clark	1,033		
Liberal Democrats	Simon Wakefield *	958		
Labour	Daniel Gordon	453	17.3	−7.1
Labour	Stephen Farrington	431		
Labour	Michaela Neild	426		
Labour	Reg Surridge	416		
Plaid Cymru	Owen John Thomas	397	15.1	+4.2
Plaid Cymru	Mari Sion	360		
Plaid Cymru	Tony Couch	335		
Green	Emma Bridger	335	12.8	N/A
Conservative	Alan Berriman	327	12.5	+1.2
Conservative	Richard Nelmes	319		
Plaid Cymru	Cristopher Heighway	313		
Conservative	Janine Jones-Prichard	308		
Conservative	Stephen Johns	293		
Green	John Cowie	286		
Turnout		2,437	16.4	−5.4
Registered electors		14,906		
Liberal Democrats hold		Swing		
Liberal Democrats hold		Swing		
Liberal Democrats hold		Swing		
Liberal Democrats hold		Swing		

=== Creigiau and St. Fagans (1 seat) ===
Creigiau & St. Fagans
Party	Candidate	Votes	%	±%
Plaid Cymru	Delme Bowen *	1,187	62.1	+1.6
Conservative	Angela Jones-Evans	441	23.1	+1.4
Labour	Jonathan Evans	188	9.8	−0.4
Liberal Democrats	Sarah Fyson	94	4.9	−2.8
Turnout		1,913	49.2	+3.5
Registered electors		3,889		
Plaid Cymru hold		Swing		

=== Cyncoed (3 seats) ===
Cyncoed
Party	Candidate	Votes	%	±%
Liberal Democrats	Kate Lloyd *	2,294	50.7	+6.8
Liberal Democrats	Margaret Jones *	2,166		
Liberal Democrats	David Rees *	2,152		
Conservative	Lee Gonzalez	1,439	31.8	+6.3
Conservative	Peter Meyer	1,383		
Conservative	Vicci Stocqueller	1,320		
Labour	Diane Owen	518	11.4	−0.3
Labour	Wendy Heaven	475		
Labour	David Taylor	415		
Plaid Cymru	Alun Ogwen	275	6.1	+0.9
Turnout		4,300	49.7	+0.3
Registered electors		8,658		
Liberal Democrats hold		Swing		
Liberal Democrats hold		Swing		
Liberal Democrats hold		Swing		

=== Ely (3 seats) ===
Ely
Party	Candidate	Votes	%	±%
Labour	Brian Finn *	1,273	46.6	−13.9
Labour	Irene Goddard *	1,257		
Labour	Russell Goodway *	1,048		
Plaid Cymru	Paul Kemble	687	25.1	−15.5
Plaid Cymru	Malcolm Marshall	657		
Conservative	Gerard Charmley	525	19.2	N/A
Conservative	Margret Evans	520		
Conservative	Rob Thomas	491		
Plaid Cymru	Rukshana Islam	470		
Liberal Democrats	Joanne Foster	248	9.1	−5.9
Liberal Democrats	Sian Cliff	241		
Liberal Democrats	Clare Lutwyche	208		
Turnout		2,719	28.7	+0.2
Registered electors		9,461		
Labour hold		Swing		
Labour hold		Swing		
Labour hold		Swing		

=== Fairwater (3 seats) ===
Fairwater
Party	Candidate	Votes	%	±%
Plaid Cymru	Neil McEvoy	1,875	48.6	+28.9
Plaid Cymru	Lisa Ford	1,802		
Plaid Cymru	Keith Parry	1,560		
Labour	John Norman *	949	24.6	−6.0
Labour	Michael Costas Michael *	944		
Labour	Derek Rees *	871		
Conservative	Richard John	837	21.7	+0.6
Conservative	Oliver Owen	780		
Conservative	Richard Minshull	750		
Liberal Democrats	Hilary Borrow	197	5.1	−10.5
Liberal Democrats	Peter Borrow	182		
Liberal Democrats	Gareth Price	175		
Turnout		3,824	40.8	+5.1
Registered electors		9,366		
Plaid Cymru gain from Labour		Swing		
Plaid Cymru gain from Labour		Swing		
Plaid Cymru gain from Labour		Swing		

=== Gabalfa (2 seats) ===
Gabalfa
Party	Candidate	Votes	%	±%
Liberal Democrats	Ed Bridges *	999	52.8	−5.4
Liberal Democrats	Cathy Pearcy *	891		
Labour	Dilwar Ali	371	19.6	−2.9
Labour	Joe Monks	313		
Conservative	Matthew Lane	217	11.5	+2.4
Conservative	Vivienne Ward	211		
Plaid Cymru	Brian Coman	175	9.3	−1.4
Green	Rosa Thomas	129	6.8	−3.5
Plaid Cymru	Anthony Evans	111		
Turnout		1,758	25.7	−2.2
Registered electors		6,832		
Liberal Democrats hold		Swing		
Liberal Democrats hold		Swing		

=== Grangetown (3 seats) ===
Grangetown
Party	Candidate	Votes	%	±%
Liberal Democrats	Francesca Montemaggi *	1,357	31.9	−5.5
Liberal Democrats	Asghar Ali *	1,319		
Liberal Democrats	David Morgan	1,317		
Labour	Lynda Thorne	1,138	26.7	−2.7
Labour	Stephen Brooks	1,131		
Labour	David Collins	1,104		
Plaid Cymru	Farida Alsam	1,099	25.8	+3.8
Plaid Cymru	Patrick Daley	1,009		
Plaid Cymru	Ioan Bellin	920		
Conservative	Benjamin Green	546	12.8	+1.6
Conservative	Mark Jones	533		
Conservative	Michael Wallbank	482		
Communist	Rick Newnham	117	2.7	N/A
Turnout		4,266	36.8	−0.2
Registered electors		11,598		
Liberal Democrats hold		Swing		
Liberal Democrats hold		Swing		
Liberal Democrats hold		Swing		

=== Heath (3 seats) ===
Heath
Party	Candidate	Votes	%	±%
Conservative	Ron Page	2,205	37.5	+18.1
Conservative	Lyn Hudson	2,135		
Liberal Democrats	Fenella Bowden	1,877	31.9	−12.6
Conservative	Christopher Williams	1,819		
Liberal Democrats	Michelle Michaells *	1,642		
Liberal Democrats	Gwllym Owen	1,545		
Labour	Rob Henley	896	15.2	−2.0
Labour	Fatimah Begum	656		
Labour	Iftakhar Khan	575		
Plaid Cymru	Nans Couch	468	8.0	+3.0
Green	Andrew Connell	435	7.4	+2.8
Turnout		4,995	51.8	−0.6
Registered electors		9,634		
Conservative gain from Liberal Democrats		Swing		
Conservative gain from Liberal Democrats		Swing		
Liberal Democrats hold		Swing		

=== Lisvane (1 seat) ===
Lisvane
Party	Candidate	Votes	%	±%
Conservative	David Walker *	1,260	79.9	+10.4
Labour	Paul Jeffries	189	12.0	+3.4
Liberal Democrats	Robert Collins	128	8.1	−4.9
Turnout		1,583	56.0	+1.6
Registered electors		2,825		
Conservative hold		Swing		

=== Llandaff (2 seats) ===
Llandaff
Party	Candidate	Votes	%	±%
Liberal Democrats	Kirsty Davies	1,273	33.0	+18.4
Liberal Democrats	Gareth Aubrey	1,173		
Conservative	Craig Williams	1,109	28.8	−6.1
Conservative	Clare Bath	1,104		
Labour	John Sheppard *	1,019	26.4	−11.3
Labour	Gill Green	825		
Plaid Cymru	Gillian M Green	454	11.8	−0.9
Turnout		3,600	50.4	+3.3
Registered electors		7,144		
Liberal Democrats gain from Labour		Swing		
Liberal Democrats gain from Labour		Swing		

=== Llandaff North (2 seats) ===
Llandaff North
Party	Candidate	Votes	%	±%
Liberal Democrats	Ann Rowland-James *	976	40.8	+4.8
Liberal Democrats	Jacqui Hooper	908		
Labour	Terry Gilder	771	32.2	−6.1
Labour	Karen Screen	757		
Conservative	Julie Driscoll	453	18.9	+2.0
Conservative	James Ward	390		
Plaid Cymru	John Rowlands	195	8.1	−0.6
Plaid Cymru	Ieuan Wyn	163		
Turnout		2,382	42.2	+5.0
Registered electors		5,639		
Liberal Democrats gain from Labour		Swing		
Liberal Democrats hold		Swing		

=== Llanishen (4 seats) ===
Llanishen
Party	Candidate	Votes	%	±%
Conservative	Jonathan Burns *	2,923	49.1	+15.5
Conservative	Craig Piper *	2,828		
Conservative	Richard Foley *	2,734		
Conservative	Robert Smith *	2,623		
Labour	Garry Hunt	1,769	29.7	−0.1
Labour	John Imperato	1,496		
Labour	Marie John	1,491		
Labour	Caroline Derbyshire	1,478		
Liberal Democrats	John Frankham-Barnes	664	11.2	−8.4
Liberal Democrats	Sarah Bridges	605		
Plaid Cymru	Lona Roberts	592	10.0	+0.6
Plaid Cymru	David Davies	588		
Liberal Democrats	Laura Pearcy	544		
Liberal Democrats	Ian Porter	449		
Plaid Cymru	Gwennol Haf	377		
Plaid Cymru	Steven Thomas	329		
Turnout		5,635	46.2	+1.3
Registered electors		12,204		
Conservative hold		Swing		
Conservative hold		Swing		
Conservative hold		Swing		
Conservative hold		Swing		

=== Llanrumney (3 seats) ===
Llanrumney
Party	Candidate	Votes	%	±%
Labour	Jackie Parry *	1,126	42.3	−5.1
Labour	Heather Joyce	1,105		
Labour	Derrick Morgan *	1,090		
Plaid Cymru	Colin Lewis	752	28.2	+5.3
Conservative	Philip James	650	24.4	+8.6
Conservative	Gerrard Harris	633		
Plaid Cymru	Terence O'Neill	621		
Plaid Cymru	Dai Reeves	531		
Conservative	Allyson Thomas	456		
Liberal Democrats	Peter Randerson	135	5.1	−8.8
Liberal Democrats	Hugh Minor	134		
Liberal Democrats	Ian Walton	116		
Turnout		2,632	33.0	+1.1
Registered electors		7,975		
Labour hold		Swing		
Labour hold		Swing		
Labour hold		Swing		

=== Pentwyn (4 seats) ===
Pentwyn
Party	Candidate	Votes	%	±%
Liberal Democrats	Judith Woodman *	1,851	50.1	+3.0
Liberal Democrats	Paul Chaundy *	1,808		
Liberal Democrats	Joseph Carter *	1,786		
Liberal Democrats	Keith Hyde *	1,778		
Labour	Mark Davies	893	24.2	−5.1
Labour	Peter Bradbury	892		
Labour	Anthony Hunt	860		
Conservative	Nigel Morgan	576	15.6	+2.5
Conservative	Huw John	560		
Conservative	Philip Marsden	530		
Conservative	Gareth Jones-Prichard	504		
Socialist	Steve Williams	376	10.2	+6.7
Turnout		3,534	34.5	−2.1
Registered electors		10,238		
Liberal Democrats hold		Swing		
Liberal Democrats hold		Swing		
Liberal Democrats hold		Swing		
Liberal Democrats hold		Swing		

=== Pentyrch (1 seat) ===
Pentyrch
Party	Candidate	Votes	%	±%
Conservative	Simon Roberts	478	34.4	+4.2
Labour	Christine Priday *	429	30.8	−3.8
Plaid Cymru	Jane Reece	275	19.8	−5.9
Liberal Democrats	Russell Hargrave	110	7.9	−1.7
Independent	Michael Jones	99	7.1	N/A
Turnout		1,392	50.8	+1.1
Registered electors		2,739		
Conservative gain from Labour		Swing		

=== Penylan (3 seats) ===
Penylan
Party	Candidate	Votes	%	±%
Liberal Democrats	Tricia Burfoot *	2,294	49.6	−4.6
Liberal Democrats	Freda Salway *	2,200		
Liberal Democrats	Bill Kelloway	2,145		
Conservative	Susan Williams	766	16.6	+3.4
Conservative	Liz Morgan	742		
Conservative	Michael Parsons	686		
Labour	Judith Anderson	680	14.7	+2.5
Labour	Ralph Rees	670		
Labour	Peter Wong	566		
Independent	Tony Verderame	535	11.6	+3.4
Plaid Cymru	Meic Peterson	351	7.6	+0.4
Plaid Cymru	Helen Bradley	332		
Plaid Cymru	Ruth Underdown	314		
Turnout		4,336	44.8	+0.6
Registered electors		9,673		
Liberal Democrats hold		Swing		
Liberal Democrats hold		Swing		
Liberal Democrats hold		Swing		

=== Plasnewydd (4 seats) ===
Plasnewydd
Party	Candidate	Votes	%	±%
Liberal Democrats	Elgan Morgan *	1,524	37.0	−2.6
Liberal Democrats	Rodney Berman *	1,479		
Liberal Democrats	Mark Stephens *	1,457		
Liberal Democrats	Richard Jerrett *	1,411		
Labour	Susan Lent	1,207	29.3	+2.1
Labour	Mary McGarry	1,040		
Labour	Mohammad Javed	1,035		
Labour	Paul Mitchell	887		
Green	Sam Coates	545	13.2	−2.1
Green	Anthony Matthews	518		
Plaid Cymru	Ashraf Ali	448	10.9	+1.1
Plaid Cymru	Gordon Bateman	428		
Conservative	Enid Harries	398	9.7	+1.5
Conservative	Kathleen Fisher	361		
Conservative	Maureen Blackmore	348		
Conservative	Dom Stocqueller	283		
Turnout		3,626	27.1	−3.6
Registered electors		13,357		
Liberal Democrats hold		Swing		
Liberal Democrats hold		Swing		
Liberal Democrats hold		Swing		
Liberal Democrats hold		Swing		

=== Pontprennau and Old St. Mellons (2 seats) ===
Pontprennau & Old St. Mellons
Party	Candidate	Votes	%	±%
Conservative	Dianne Rees *	1,362	50.6	+11.0
Conservative	Jane Rogers	1,274		
Labour	Georgina Phillips *	1,092	40.6	+4.2
Labour	Lisa Stevens	938		
Liberal Democrats	Ronald Michaells	237	8.8	−8.1
Liberal Democrats	Charles Woodman	233		
Turnout		2,710	40.3	+1.4
Registered electors		6,719		
Conservative hold		Swing		
Conservative gain from Labour		Swing		

=== Radyr (1 seat) ===
Radyr
Party	Candidate	Votes	%	±%
Conservative	Roderick McKerlich	1,344	60.2	+20.1
Labour	James Knight	440	19.7	−23.0
Liberal Democrats	Catherine Sloan	234	10.5	+1.1
Plaid Cymru	Ian Hughes	215	9.6	+1.8
Turnout		2,241	51.5	−1.5
Registered electors		4,354		
Conservative gain from Labour		Swing		

=== Rhiwbina (3 seats) ===
Rhiwbina
Party	Candidate	Votes	%	±%
Independent	Jayne Cowan *	3,724	55.1	−4.2
Independent	Adrian Robson *	3,452		
Independent	Brian Jones	2,828		
Conservative	Gareth Neale *	1,747	25.9	−25.0
Conservative	Debi Ashton	1,461		
Conservative	Chris Taylor	1,389		
Labour	John Wake	600	8.9	−11.9
Plaid Cymru	Alun Guy	272	4.0	−5.1
Plaid Cymru	Ann Brain	264		
Plaid Cymru	Falmai Griffiths	248		
Green	Anne Greagsby	214	3.2	N/A
Liberal Democrats	Patricia Azzopardi	200	3.0	−16.2
Liberal Democrats	Rachel Thomas	165		
Liberal Democrats	Edward Mason	128		
Turnout		5,719	62.3	+8.0
Registered electors		9,173		
Independent gain from Conservative		Swing		
Independent gain from Conservative		Swing		
Independent gain from Conservative		Swing		

=== Riverside (3 seats) ===
Riverside
Party	Candidate	Votes	%	±%
Plaid Cymru	Sarul Islam *	1,064	43.9	+11.7
Plaid Cymru	Gwenllian Lansdown *	1,064		
Plaid Cymru	Jas Singh	991		
Labour	Mark Drakeford	786	32.4	+3.9
Labour	Ali Ahmed	743		
Labour	Susan Evans	707		
Conservative	Russell Cotty	295	12.2	+1.8
Liberal Democrats	Molly Hughes	280	11.5	−3.9
Liberal Democrats	Phil Bale	250		
Liberal Democrats	Michael Hyde	235		
Conservative	Shazia Awan	209		
Conservative	Shana Awan	206		
Turnout		3,659	39.9	−0.6
Registered electors		9,170		
Plaid Cymru hold		Swing		
Plaid Cymru hold		Swing		
Plaid Cymru gain from Labour		Swing		

=== Rumney (2 seats) ===
Rumney
Party	Candidate	Votes	%	±%
Conservative	John Ireland	1,073	49.2	+15.1
Conservative	Duncan MacDonald	1,038		
Labour	Robert Derbyshire *	908	41.6	+1.9
Labour	Geoff Parry	870		
Liberal Democrats	Anabella Rees	200	9.2	−8.4
Liberal Democrats	Emma Woodman	189		
Turnout		2,248	34.5	+0.4
Registered electors		6,521		
Conservative gain from Labour		Swing		
Conservative gain from Labour		Swing		

=== Splott (3 seats) ===
Splott
Party	Candidate	Votes	%	±%
Liberal Democrats	Gavin Cox *	1,490	39.7	+2.5
Labour	Clarissa Holland *	1,485	39.6	+9.3
Labour	Martin Holland	1,350		
Labour	Matthew Greenough	1,215		
Liberal Democrats	Alex Evans *	1,211		
Liberal Democrats	Nadeem Majid	1,149		
Conservative	Martyn Miller	373	9.9	+3.9
Conservative	Paul Pavia	329		
Conservative	Yasser Mahmood	292		
Plaid Cymru	Kibria Shah	275	7.3	+2.1
Plaid Cymru	Nerys Morgan	231		
Plaid Cymru	Daniel Mason	212		
Communist	Robert Griffiths	127	3.4	+2.0
Turnout		3,480	38.4	+1.0
Registered electors		9,050		
Liberal Democrats hold		Swing		
Labour gain from Liberal Democrats		Swing		
Labour hold		Swing		

=== Trowbridge (3 seats) ===
Trowbridge
Party	Candidate	Votes	%	±%
Labour	Ralph Cook *	1,253	36.5	−1.8
Liberal Democrats	Geraldine Grant	1,142	33.3	+18.3
Labour	Monica Walsh *	1,124		
Liberal Democrats	Jeremy Townsend	1,107		
Liberal Democrats	Elizabeth Woodman	1,072		
Labour	Gretta Hunt	916		
Independent	Clifford Furnish	531	15.5	+0.1
Conservative	Barbara Jeffreys	506	14.7	+0.3
Conservative	Jean Summerhayes	482		
Conservative	Kim Summerhayes	447		
Independent	Simon Swanton	413		
Turnout		3,211	30.5	+5.4
Registered electors		10,527		
Labour hold		Swing		
Liberal Democrats gain from Labour		Swing		
Labour hold		Swing		

=== Whitchurch and Tongwynlais (4 seats) ===
Whitchurch & Tongwynlais
Party	Candidate	Votes	%	±%
Conservative	Timothy Davies *	2,948	40.5	+6.6
Conservative	Linda Morgan *	2,904		
Conservative	Brian Griffiths *	2,857		
Conservative	Michael Jones-Pritchard	2,790		
Labour	Sophie Howe *	2,658	36.5	+3.6
Labour	Peter Howe	2,147		
Labour	Bev Hampson	2,023		
Labour	Lucy Merredy	1,962		
Plaid Cymru	Glenys Evans	771	10.6	−0.2
Plaid Cymru	Wyn Jones	748		
Plaid Cymru	Ceri Morgan	715		
Plaid Cymru	Dewi Owen	669		
Liberal Democrats	Siobhan McGurk	505	6.9	−8.5
Liberal Democrats	Nia Jones	471		
Liberal Democrats	Joyce Lentern	398		
UKIP	Joe Callan	398	5.5	
Liberal Democrats	Martin Wolstencroft	329		
Turnout		6,703	53.1	+2.7
Registered electors		12,617		
Conservative hold		Swing		
Conservative hold		Swing		
Conservative hold		Swing		
Conservative gain from Labour		Swing		

== By-elections between 2008 and 2012 ==
=== Pentyrch ===
Pentyrch by-election, 31 July 2008
Party	Candidate	Votes	%	±%
Conservative	Craig Williams	554	41.9	+7.5
Labour	Christine Priday	542	41.0	+10.2
Plaid Cymru	Ian Hughes	129	9.8	−10.0
Liberal Democrats	Alexandria Evans	97	7.3	−0.6
Majority		12	0.9	N/A
Turnout			48.2	−2.6
Registered electors				
Conservative hold		Swing	-1.3	

The by-election was called following the resignation of Cllr. Simon Roberts.

=== Riverside ===
Riverside by-election, 3 March 2011
Party	Candidate	Votes	%	±%
Labour	Iona Gordon	1,700	46.8	+14.4
Plaid Cymru	Steve Garrett	1,099	30.3	−13.6
Conservative	James Roach	369	10.2	−2.0
Green	Yvan Maurel	277	7.6	N/A
Liberal Democrats	Gwilym Owen	187	5.1	−6.4
Majority		601	16.5	N/A
Turnout		3,655	39.8	−0.1
Registered electors		9,188		
Labour gain from Plaid Cymru		Swing		

The by-election was called following the resignation of Cllr. Gwenllian Lansdown.
