= Russell Deacon =

Welsh historian, visiting Professor and author (born 1966)

Russell Deacon is a Welsh historian and author, writing in the areas of governance and policy.

== Early life ==
Deacon was born in Newbury, Berkshire in 1966. While in Wales he has lived in the Rhondda Valley, Pontypridd and for many years in Caerphilly.

== Education ==
Deacon went to Denefield School, then to Reading and Aylesbury Colleges. He studied Business Studies, Accountancy and Law at vocational and A level. He went onto work for a number of major companies in a finance role, including Equitable Life, Granada TV and Medicare. In 1987 he spent a period living in Memphis, Tennessee and has been a regular visitor to the United States in the following decades. In the same year as he lived in Memphis, Deacon became an undergraduate on the BA (Hons) Public Administration degree programme in the University Glamorgan in 1987 to 1991. This was a four-year degree and he spent the sandwich year working in the European Affairs Division of the Welsh Office. After graduating from the University of Glamorgan he spent a further year undertaking postgraduate study at Cardiff University where he obtained a PGCE in FE. In 1999 he was also awarded a PhD from the University of Glamorgan on 'The Welsh Office and the Policy Process'.

== Academic career ==
Deacon's professional career started in 1992 at University of Wales Institute, Cardiff (UWIC) when he was employed to teach public affairs to the National Council for Journalists professional training courses. He served in the Business School for the next 8 years finishing as the director of research on the MBA programme. In 2001 he helped start the Humanities courses at UWIC in the School of Lifelong Learning. The first cohort had around 45 students, the degree programmes now, in the School of Education, have around 350 students connected with the Humanities pathways. In 2006 he became Head of the newly formed Department of Humanities. Then in 2008 he became the Acting Director of Research for the School of Education. In April 2010 he was awarded a personal chair by UWIC and made his inaugural lecture on Politics and Humour in February 2011. Deacon left UWIC in July 2011 and from the Autumn of 2011 he worked with the Department of History at the University of Wales Trinity St Davids. Recently Deacon is now working at University of South Wales teaching History in 2026

Deacon was previously associated with the running of the ERASMUS programme in UWIC. In this respect he has presented on the subject at academic conferences and published in an academic journal.

Deacon has also had a long period directly involved in politics specifically for the Welsh Liberal Democrats. In 1992 and 1997 he was the agent in the Rhondda Valley, the later time for Dr Rodney Berman the ex-leader of Cardiff City Council. Although he stood for council office 15 times he was only successful twice, he served on Van Community Council as the only elected Liberal Democrat in the Caerphilly County Borough area. In the 1997 referendum Deacon served on the Board of the Yes for Wales Campaign, directed by Leighton Andrews. On the night of the referendum itself he provided the expert media coverage for ITN. In 1998 he worked for a while in Westminster in support of the Welsh Liberal Democrats during the drafting of the Government of Wales Act 1998 under the late Lord Richard Livsey. In 1999 he was seconded to the National Assembly for Wales for one year to help set up the administrative structures. There he worked directly to Lord German, the then leader of the Welsh Liberal Democrats.

Deacon has made numerous media appearances for BBC programmes such as AM/PM, the Politics Show, television series such as Coming Home and The History of Wales, as well as radio programmes on Radios 2, 4 and Radio Wales. Deacon became the Chair of the Campaign for a Welsh Parliament between 2005–2008. He also serves on the Boards of the National Library of Wales Political Archives, the Welsh Council of the European Movement, History Research Wales and the Liberal History Society.

Deacon was an advisor to the Electoral Reform Society on the referendum in May 2011 on the Alternative Vote. He has appeared as an expert witness before many Westminster and Welsh Assembly Commissions on electoral and political reform. In recent years Deacon has also advised the WJEC and Qualifications Wales on the syllabus for the Welsh AS and A level programmes in Politics

Deacon has also been a key note speaker at the Lloyd George Society, the WJEC politic students' conference and at a number of European Universities including the Ghent University, Johan Gutenberg University in Mainz and the University of Plovdiv in Bulgaria. In 2010 Deacon was made a royal fellow when he was elected to the Royal Historical Society.

== Publications ==
Deacon has developed his research in both contemporary politics and history and has therefore published numerous articles and books related to this. In particular he has written on the topics of devolution and the history of the Liberal Party in Wales and the UK.

Deacon has written around 80 articles, book chapters and books. The main books he had written in the last few decades are:

- Devolved Great Britain: the New Governance of England, Scotland and Wales, with Dylan Griffiths and Peter Lynch, Sheffield Hallam University Press, 2000
- ‘God Bless the Prince of Wales’, with Steve Belzak, Centre for Reform in Wales, 2000
- The Welsh Office and the Policy Process (1964–1999), Welsh Academic Press, 2002
- Devolution in Britain Today, Manchester University Press, 2006
- Devolved Great Britain: the New Governance of England, Scotland and Wales with Alan Sandry, Edinburgh University Press, 2007
- Devolution in Great Britain, Edinburgh University Press, 2012
- The Welsh Liberals: The History of the Liberal and Liberal Democrat parties in Wales, Welsh Academic Press, 2014
- The Government and Politics of Wales, Edinburgh University Press, 2018
