= Roderick Evans =

British judge (born 1946)

Sir David Roderick Evans FLSW (born 22 October 1946) is a former judge of the High Court of England and Wales.

== Early life ==
Evans studied at University College, London, before becoming a lecturer in commercial law at the University of Wales. He also became active in Plaid Cymru, and stood unsuccessfully as the party's candidate in Swansea East at the 1970 general election.

== Legal career ==
Evans was called to the bar at Gray's Inn in 1970 and made a bencher of Gray's and admitted ad eundem to Lincoln's Inn in 2001. He was appointed a Recorder on the Wales and Chester Circuit in 1987. In 1989, he became a Queen's Counsel. Evans became a circuit judge in 1992, serving as resident judge in Merthyr Tydfil from 1994 to 1998 and resident judge at Swansea from 1998 to 1999. He served as senior circuit judge and Recorder of Cardiff from 1999 to 2001. On 23 April 2001, he was appointed a High Court judge, receiving the customary knighthood, and assigned to the Queen's Bench Division. He served as a presiding judge for the Wales and Chester Circuit from 2004 to 2007 and for Wales in 2007.

Evans served as a member of the Criminal Committee of the Judicial Studies Board (now the Judicial College) from 1998 to 2001. In 2002 became a member of the Gorsedd of Bards. He served as secretary of the Association of Judges of Wales in 2008. In 2011, he served as a member of the Parole Board. In 2012, he was chairman of the Wales Committee of the Judicial College.

Evans retired on 1 May 2013, and subsequently took up a position as the Standards Commissioner for the National Assembly for Wales. He resigned from the position in November 2019, after it was revealed that former AM Neil McEvoy had secretly recorded confidential conversations between Sir Roderick and his staff.

In 2015, Evans was elected a Fellow of the Learned Society of Wales.
