= Heath (Cardiff ward) =

Coordinates: 51.511°N 3.199°W

- Electoral ward
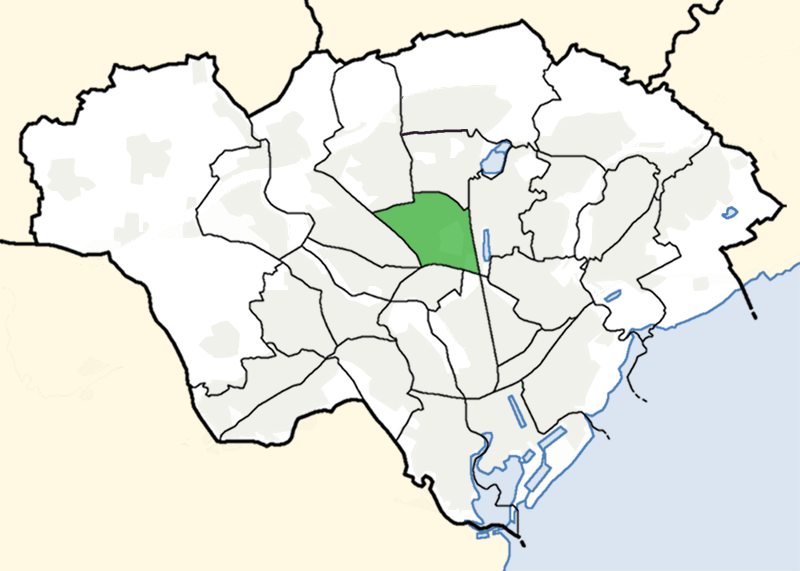
- Location of the Heath ward within Cardiff
- Population: 12,629 (2011 census)
- Community: Heath
- Principal area: Cardiff
- Country: Wales
- Sovereign state: United Kingdom
- UK Parliament: Cardiff North
- Senedd Cymru – Welsh Parliament: Cardiff North
- Councillors: 3 (Cardiff Council)

Heath (Welsh: Y Mynydd Bychan) is an electoral ward in the north of the city of Cardiff, Wales, which covers its namesake community, Heath. The ward elects three county councillors to the County Council of the City and County of Cardiff.

== Description and history ==
The Heath ward boundaries are coterminous with the community. It is bordered to the north by Ty-wern Road (Rhiwbina ward) and the Cardiff City Line (Llanishen ward), to the east by the Cardiff to Caerphilly railway line (Cyncoed ward), to the south by the Western by-pass (Gabalfa ward) and to the west by the A470 road (Whitchurch & Tongwynlais ward). The Heath ward includes the University Hospital of Wales and the large adjacent area of greenery, Heath Park.

According to the 2011 census the population of the Heath ward was 12,629.

Since the creation of the Cardiff unitary authority in 1995, Heath has elected councillors from the Labour Party, Liberal Democrats, Conservatives and, since 2012, the Heath and Birchgrove Independents.

The ward was created following The City of Cardiff (Electoral Arrangements) Order 1982, coming into effect with the city council elections in 1983.

== Cardiff Council elections ==
=== 2021 by-election ===
Long-standing councillor Fenella Bowden, retired for health reasons in September 2021, leading to a by-election seen as an important sign of voter intentions ahead of the 2022 Cardiff Council election. The by-election took place on 11 November 2021 and was won by Labour candidate, Julie Sangani, with 47.1% of the vote.

=== 2012/2017 ===
Liberal Democrat councillor, Fenella Bowden, left her party in November 2010 to sit on the Council as an Independent councillor. At the subsequent 2012 and 2017 elections the ward elected Bowden standing as a Heath and Birchgrove Independent, Lyn Hudson for the Conservatives and Graham Hinchey for the Labour Party.

Cardiff Council election, 4 May 2012
Party	Candidate	Votes	%	±%
Heath Independent	Fenella Bowden *	1,500	12.1%	
Labour	Graham Hinchey *	1,416	11.4%	
Conservative	Lyn Hudson	1,270	10.2%	
Conservative	Roland Page *	1,242	10.0%	
Labour	Marie John	1,240	10.0%	
Heath Independent	Steven Bowden	1,151	9.3%	
Labour	Ewan Moor	1,116	9.0%	
Conservative	Mark Branton	1,101	8.9%	
Heath Independent	Katrin O'Malley	888	7.1%	
Labour	John James	349	2.8%	
Plaid Cymru	Mali Rowlands	325	2.6%	
Heath Independent	Robert Smith	262	2.1%	
Green	Tom Coates	253	2.0%	
Liberal Democrats	Steven Price	175	1.4%	
Liberal Democrats	Ashley Wood	140	1.1%	
Turnout				
Heath Independent gain from Liberal Democrats				
Labour hold		Swing		
Conservative hold		Swing		

* = sitting councillor prior to the election

Following the May 2004 elections all three councillors were Liberal Democrat, with Graham Hinchey losing his seat. Hinchey had previously been a Labour councillor for the ward since 1995. After the 1995 elections there were two Labour councillors and one Liberal Democrat. After the 1999 elections there were two Liberal Democrats and one Labour councillor.

== Cardiff City Council elections ==
The Heath ward was created in 1982. Prior to 1995 Heath was an electoral ward to Cardiff City Council (a district council of South Glamorgan). The ward elected three city councillors. All three city councillors were from the Conservative Party, from the 1983 council elections until the creation of the new Cardiff unitary authority.

Councillors included Ron Watkiss, Conservative leader of the council from 1983.
