= Huw Thomas (Labour politician) =

Welsh politician (born 1985)

Huw Thomas MS
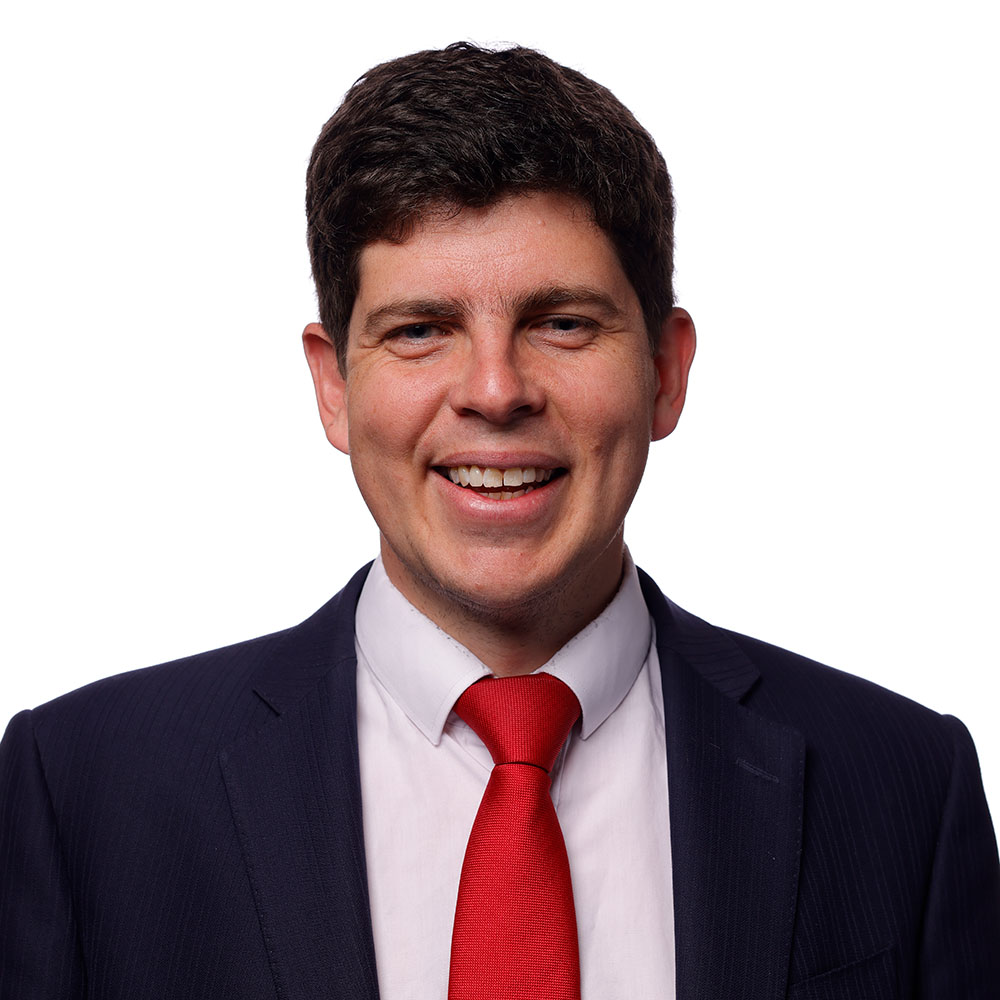
- Official Portrait, 2026

Member of the Senedd for Caerdydd Penarth
- Incumbent
- Assumed office 8 May 2026

Leader of Cardiff Council
- In office 8 May 2017 – 9 May 2026
- Preceded by: Phil Bale
- Succeeded by: Chris Weaver

Cardiff Councillor for Splott
- In office 3 May 2012 – 9 May 2026

Personal details
- Born: 1985 (age 40–41) Aberystwyth
- Party: Welsh Labour
- Education: Oxford University, Aberystwyth University

Huw Thomas (born 1985) is a Welsh politician who has served as a Member of the Senedd (MS) for Caerdydd Penarth since May 2026. A member of Welsh Labour, Thomas previously served as leader of Cardiff Council between 2017 and 2026, and as a councillor for Splott from 2012 to 2026.

== Childhood and education ==
Huw Thomas was born in Aberystwyth in 1985 and attended local schools before studying Music at Oxford University and a Masters in International Relations at Aberystwyth University

After graduating he worked in the third sector in Cardiff, including for Sustrans and as Head of Christian Aid Wales. Thomas speaks Welsh.

== Political career ==
=== Cardiff Council Executive (2012–2014) ===
Thomas was elected to represent the Splott ward on Cardiff Council in 2012 he was immediately appointed as Executive Member for Cabinet Member for Culture, Leisure & Sport in the new Labour administration. In this role he oversaw the renovation of Fairwater leisure centre, as well as the small role Cardiff played in the 2012 Olympic games. Later that year, plans to hold the World Boxing Convention in Cardiff in 2013 fell through, with the Convention's organisers saying the new administration had 'shown no interest' in holding the event. Thomas responded by saying that the cost of £200,000 the previous administration had pledged "delivered nothing to ordinary people", describing the costs the council were asked to contribute to as 'staggering'. The former deputy leader of the Council, Neil McEvoy, called for Thomas's resignation over the cancellation. Thomas later announced community boxing development grants for 8 boxing clubs across Cardiff. He also worked towards bids for Cardiff to host the Euro 2020 football tournament and the 2026 Commonwealth Games, and secured the 2018 Volvo Ocean Race.

In July 2013 he was briefly moved to become the Cabinet Member for Strategic Planning and the city's local development plan. However, the council's legal team decided that Thomas's role for Sustrans constituted a conflict of interest, and he was therefore moved three days later to hold the portfolio for Adult Services. Thomas left his post in March 2014 following the appointment of new Council leader Phil Bale.

=== Ceredigion 2015 Campaign ===
In February 2014 Thomas was selected as the Welsh Labour candidate to contest Ceredigion in the 2015 General Election where he finished fifth with 9.7% of the vote.

During the election he was highly critical of his Plaid Cymru rival Mike Parker over Parker's remarks made in 2001 about English people coming to live in Wales which he described as parts of Wales of being inhabited by "gun-toting Final Solution crackpots" and likened English incomers [to Mid Wales] to Nazis. Thomas said: "There should be no place in our politics or our society for such divisive and hateful language." It emerged during the campaign that as a student he had suggested to friends in Wales via an online forum that cars flying the English Flag during the 2006 World Cup could be vandalised with tippex whilst simultaneously suggesting that those who flew them were a "simpleton" or a "casual racist". Thomas apologised for the remarks in 2015 when they were published by the BBC.

=== Leader of Cardiff Council (2017–2026) ===
Thomas was re-elected as a Councillor in 2017 and quickly announced he planned to challenge the then leader of Cardiff Council Phil Bale for the leadership – a challenge he won. He was at the time Wales's youngest council leader, at age 31. He declared the construction of the new Cardiff Bus Interchange and Central square redevelopment plan, as well as a new indoor arena for Cardiff as his priorities upon becoming leader.

As leader he proposed a Cardiff style 'Crossrail' scheme, and faced criticism for suggesting a Congestion Charge for Cardiff.

Following his election to the Senedd, on 9 May 2026 Thomas resigned as leader of Cardiff Council.

=== Member of the Senedd (2026–present) ===
Thomas was selected as Welsh Labour's top-ranked candidate for the 2026 Senedd election in the new superconstituency of Caerdydd Penarth. He was subsequently elected as a MS.
