= Cardiff Council =

Local government of Cardiff, Wales

Cardiff Council Cyngor Caerdydd (Welsh)
- Council logo

Type
- Type: Principal council of City and County of Cardiff

History
- Founded: 1 April 1996
- Preceded by: Cardiff City Council; South Glamorgan County Council

Leadership
- Lord Mayor: Michael Michael, Labour since 21 May 2026
- Leader: Chris Weaver, Labour since 21 May 2026
- Chief Executive: Christopher Lee since 17 August 2026

Structure
- Seats: 79
- Graph of the party split among 79 seats.
- Political groups: Administration (50) Labour (50) Other parties (29) Liberal Democrats (10) Conservative (9) Plaid Cymru (2) Green (1) Propel (1) Reform (1) Independent (5)
- Length of term: 5 years

Elections
- Voting system: First-past-the-post
- First election: 4 May 1995
- Last election: 5 May 2022
- Next election: 6 May 2027

Meeting place
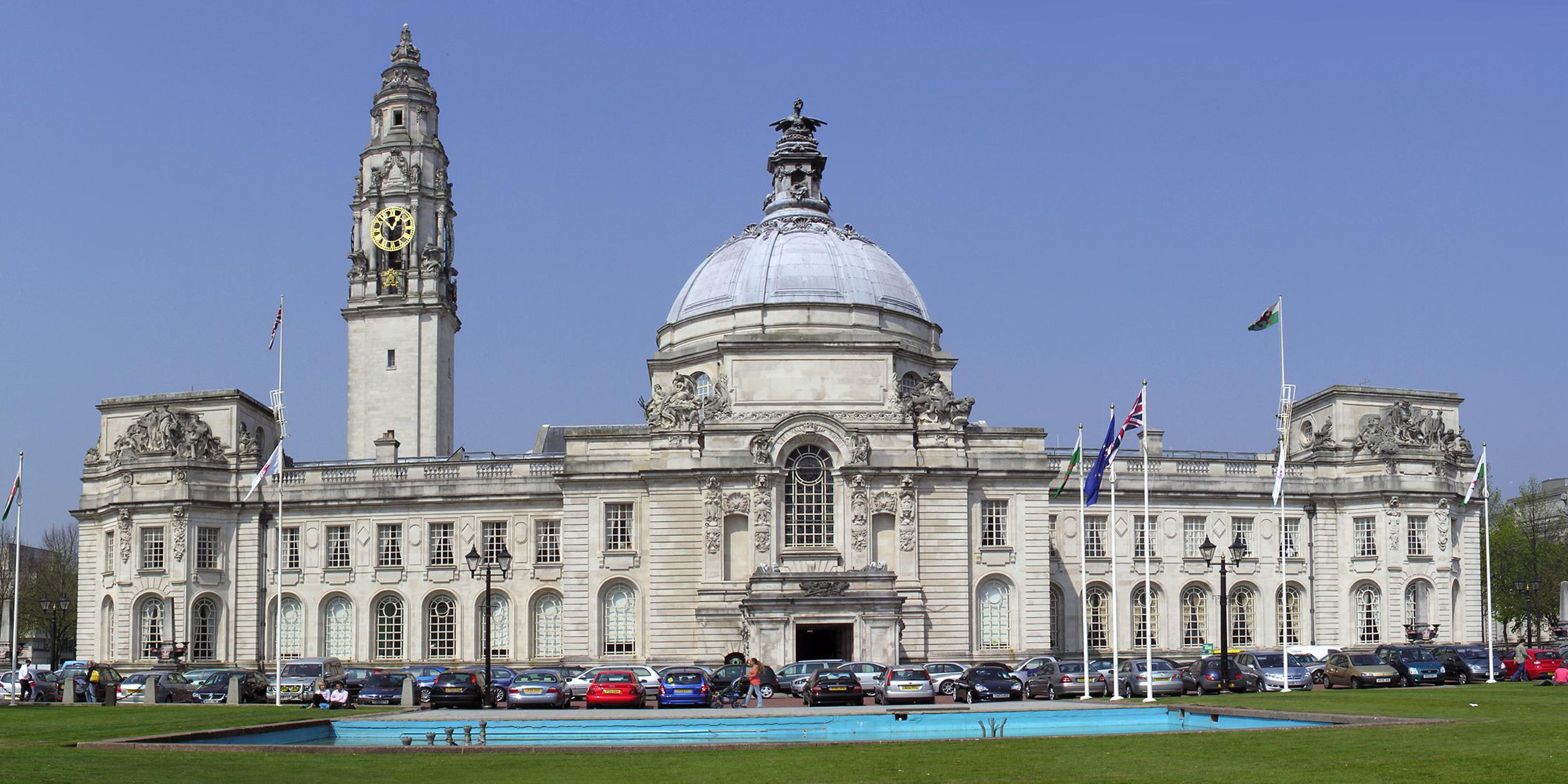
- City Hall, Cathays Park, Cardiff, CF10 3ND

Website
- www.cardiff.gov.uk

Cardiff Council, formally the County Council of the City and County of Cardiff (Welsh: Cyngor Sir Dinas a Sir Caerdydd) is the local authority for Cardiff, one of the principal areas of Wales. The principal area and its council were established in 1996 to replace the previous Cardiff City Council which had been a lower-tier authority within South Glamorgan. Cardiff Council consists of 79 councillors, representing 28 electoral wards.

Labour has held a majority of the seats on the council since 2012. The last election was in May 2022 and the next election is due in 2027.

== History ==
Municipal life in Cardiff dates back to the 12th century, when Cardiff was granted borough status by the Earls of Gloucester. The offices of the mayor, aldermen, and common councillors developed during the Middle Ages. When elected county councils were established in 1889 under the Local Government Act 1888, Cardiff was considered large enough to run its own services and so it became a county borough, independent from Glamorgan County Council. The town of Cardiff was still considered the county town of Glamorgan, with Glamorgan County Council building its headquarters there. Cardiff was one of only two county boroughs in Wales created in 1889, the other being Swansea. (Newport was later elevated to county borough status in 1891, followed by Merthyr Tydfil in 1908.) In 1905, Cardiff became a city, and thereafter Cardiff County Borough Council was allowed to call itself Cardiff City Council.

In 1974 local government across Wales and England was restructured into a two-tier system under the Local Government Act 1972. Cardiff became a lower-tier district council, called Cardiff City Council, within the new county of South Glamorgan. The South Glamorgan County Council provided county-level services in the area.

Further local government restructuring in 1996 under the Local Government (Wales) Act 1994 saw the city of Cardiff become a unitary authority: the present Cardiff Council. South Glamorgan County Council was abolished. Ahead of the reforms the county council had campaigned for a new "Greater Cardiff" authority to reflect the boundaries of South Glamorgan, but the Conservative government of the time decided to keep the Vale of Glamorgan (which covered a marginal Conservative parliamentary seat) separate from Cardiff.

The 1994 Act directed that the new council should be called "Cardiff County Council". The council's constitution calls it instead the "County Council of the City and County of Cardiff". For most purposes the council styles itself "Cardiff Council", except where the full legal name is required, when it uses the form from its constitution.

== Political control ==
The first election to the reconstituted council was held in 1995. It initially operated as a shadow authority alongside the outgoing authorities until it formally came into its powers on 1 April 1996. Political control of the council since 1996 has been as follows:

Party in control	Years
Labour	1996–2004
No overall control	2004–2012
Labour	2012–present

=== Leadership ===
The role of Lord Mayor of Cardiff is largely ceremonial. Political leadership is provided instead by the leader of the council, although the two roles were temporarily combined between 1999 and 2003. The first leader following the 1996 reforms was Russell Goodway, who had been the last leader of South Glamorgan County Council. The leaders of Cardiff Council since 1996 have been:

Councillor	Party	From	To
Russell Goodway	Labour	1 April 1996	June 2004
Rodney Berman	Liberal Democrats	1 July 2004	May 2012
Heather Joyce	Labour	17 May 2012	27 March 2014
Phil Bale	Labour	27 March 2014	May 2017
Huw Thomas	Labour	25 May 2017	10 May 2026
Chris Weaver	Labour	21 May 2026	

=== Composition ===
Following the 2022 election and subsequent by-elections and changes of allegiance up to October 2026, the composition of the council was:

Party	Seats
Labour	50
Liberal Democrats	10
Conservative	9
Plaid Cymru	2
Green	1
Propel	1
Reform	1
Independent	5
Total	79

Of the independent councillors, two sit together as the "Cardiff Independent" group, and the other three do not belong to any group. The Green and Plaid Cymru councillors sit together as a group called "Plaid Cymru, Green Party, Common Ground" (Plaid Cymru, Plaid Werdd, Tir Cyffredin). The next full council election is due in 2027.

== Elections ==
Since 2012, Cardiff Council elections have taken place every five years.

The council was run by a Labour majority administration between 1995 and 2004. The Liberal Democrats ran a minority administration from 2004, in coalition with Plaid Cymru.

Following the 2008 local elections in Cardiff there was still no party with an overall majority. The Lib Dems increased their total number of councillors to 35, forming an administration with Plaid Cymru, with Rodney Berman as leader of the Council. The Conservatives replaced Labour as the official opposition. Labour suffered badly, losing 14 councillors. Plaid Cymru gained four councillors. Three independent councillors were elected; two former Conservatives who had left the group in 2006 being joined by an additional member.

In 2012, the Labour Party took overall control of the council, and remained in overall control following the 2017 and 2022 elections.

Year	Seats	Labour	Liberal Democrats	Conservative	Plaid Cymru	Independent / Other	Notes
1995	72	**61**	9	1	1	0	Labour majority control
1999	75	**50**	18	5	1	1	Labour majority control
2004	75	27	**33**	12	3	0	Lib Dem minority
2008	75	13	**35**	17	7	3	Lib Dem / Plaid Cymru coalition
2012	75	**46**	16	7	2	4	Labour majority control
2017	75	**40**	11	20	3	1	Labour majority control
2022	79	**55**	10	11	2 (Note: Plaid Cymru / Green Common Ground Alliance)	1 (Note: Neil McEvoy elected as Propel)	Labour majority control

Party with the most elected councillors in bold. Coalition agreements in notes column.

== Premises ==
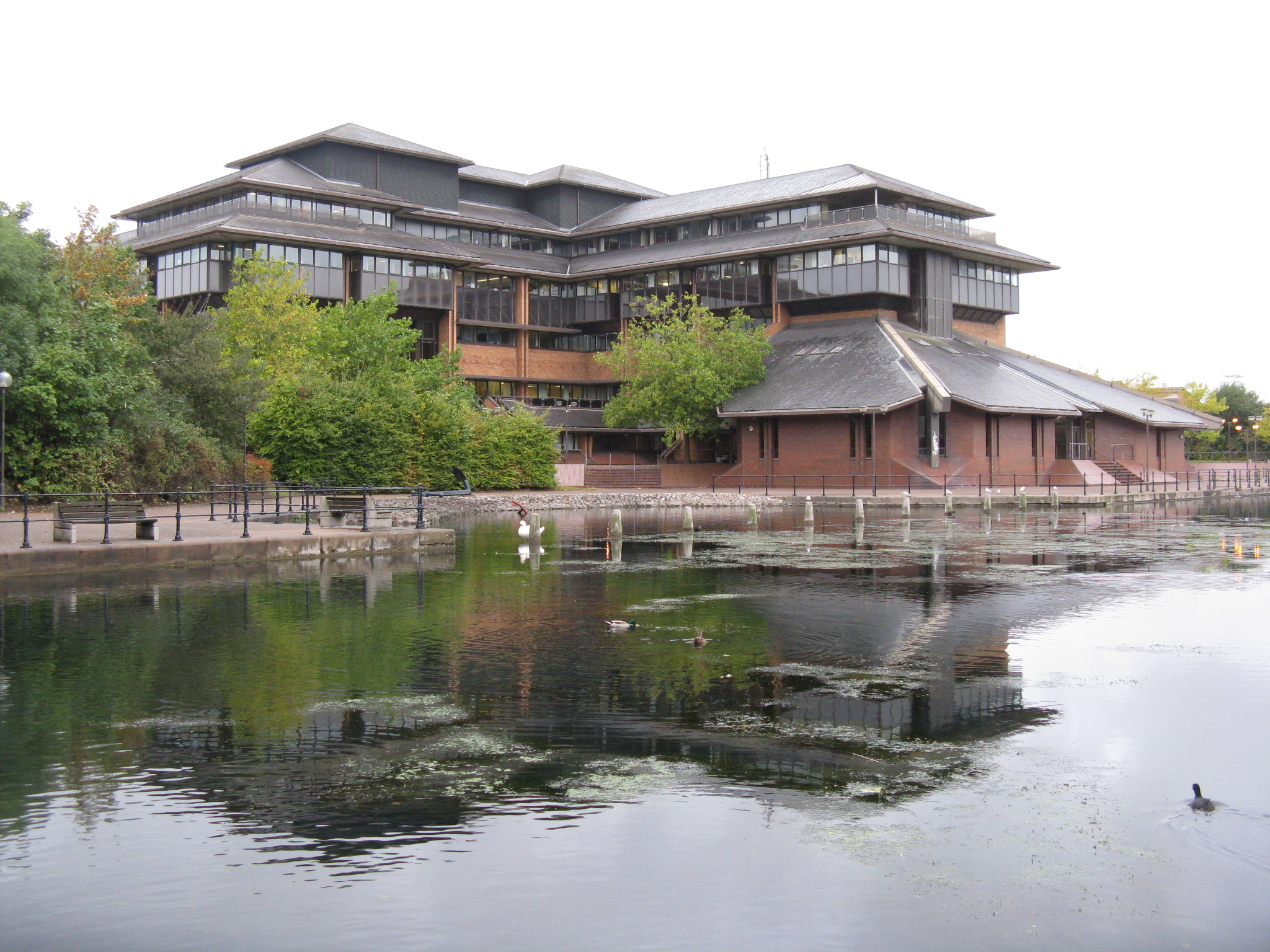
County Hall, Atlantic Wharf, Cardiff

The council's main offices are at County Hall on Atlantic Wharf. It was built in 1987 as the headquarters of the former South Glamorgan County Council. The council also uses the City Hall on Cathays Park in the city centre, built in 1906 for the former Cardiff City Council. Full council meetings were held at County Hall prior to 2020, when the COVID-19 pandemic required meetings to be held virtually. From the resumption of in-person meetings in May 2022, full council meetings were held at City Hall. City Hall closed for refurbishment in 2023 but is planned to be brought back into use as the council's meeting place once the work is complete. In September 2026, it was reported that the refurbishment may not be completed until summer 2027.

== Electoral wards ==
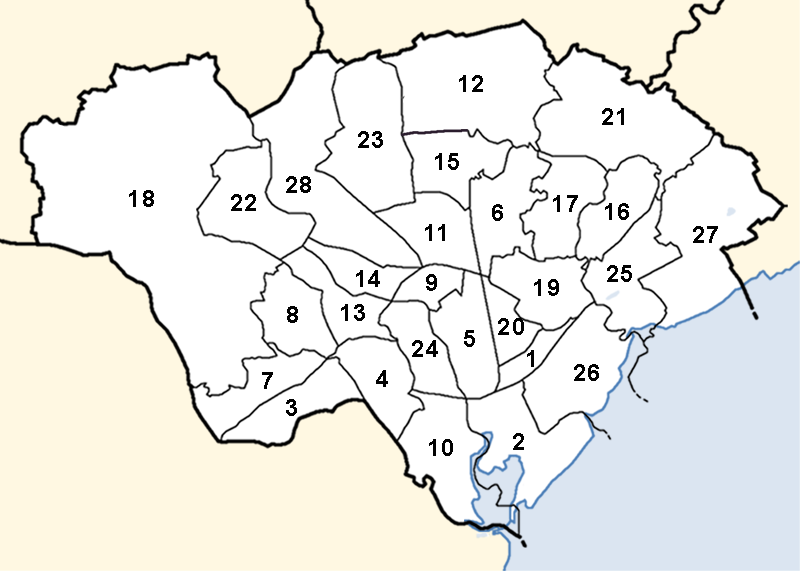
Numbered map of electoral wards (alphabetical order) of Cardiff

Since the 2022 elections, the unitary authority area has been divided into 28 electoral wards. Many of these wards are coterminous with communities of the same name. The following table lists council wards, communities and associated geographical areas. Communities with a community council are indicated with an asterisk.

Ward		Communities	Other geographic areas
1	Adamsdown	Adamsdown	
2	Butetown	Butetown	Atlantic Wharf, Cardiff Bay, Cardiff city centre (part), Tiger Bay, Flatholm
3	Caerau	Caerau	Culverhouse Cross
4	Canton	Canton	Leckwith, Victoria Park
5	Cathays	Cathays and Castle	Blackweir, Cardiff city centre (Castle), Cathays, Cathays Park, Maindy
6	Cyncoed	Cyncoed	Roath Park, Lakeside
7	Ely	Ely	Culverhouse Cross, Michaelston-super-Ely
8	Fairwater	Fairwater	Pentrebane
9	Gabalfa	Gabalfa	Mynachdy, Maindy, Heath
10	Grangetown	Grangetown	Cardiff Bay (part), Saltmead, International Sports Village
11	Heath	Heath	Birchgrove
12	Lisvane and Thornhill	Lisvane* and Thornhill	Cefn Onn
13	Llandaff	Llandaff	Danescourt
14	Llandaff North	Llandaff North	Hailey Park, Lydstep Park, Mynachdy, Gabalfa
15	Llanishen	Llanishen	
16	Llanrumney	Llanrumney	
17	Pentwyn	Pentwyn and Llanedeyrn (since 2016)	
18	Pentyrch and St Fagans	Pentyrch* and St Fagans*	Capel Llanilltern, Coedbychan, Creigiau, Gwaelod-y-Garth, Rhydlafar
19	Penylan	Penylan	
20	Plasnewydd	Roath	Cardiff city centre (part)
21	Pontprennau and Old St Mellons	Old St. Mellons* and Pontprennau	Llanedeyrn Village
22	Radyr	Radyr & Morganstown*	Morganstown, Radyr
23	Rhiwbina	Rhiwbina	Pantmawr, Rhydwaedlyd, Wenallt
24	Riverside	Riverside and Pontcanna	Part of Cardiff city centre, Llandaff Fields, Sophia Gardens
25	Rumney	Rumney	
26	Splott	Splott and Tremorfa	Pengam Green
27	Trowbridge	Trowbridge	St Mellons estate, Cefn Mably, Wentloog
28	Whitchurch & Tongwynlais	Tongwynlais* and Whitchurch	Blaengwynlais, Bwlch-y-cwm, Coedcefngarw, Coryton, Cwmnofydd, Graig-goch, Llandaff North

== Arms ==
Coat of arms of Cardiff Council
Crest A Tudor rose on three ostrich feathers Argent issuing out of a mural crown Proper. Granted 6 October 1906. Escutcheon Argent on a mount Vert a dragon rampant Gules supporting in front of a leek issuing from the mount a flag staff erect Proper flying therefrom to the sinister a banner of the third charged with three chevronels of the first. Granted 26 August 1906 Supporters On the dexter side a goat and on the sinister side a sea horse both Proper as an honourable augmentation Her Majesty's Royal Badge for Wales videlicet within a circular riband Argent fimbriated Or bearing the motto Y DDRAIG GOCH DDYRY CYCHWYN in letters Vert and ensigned with a representation of the crown Proper an escutcheon per fess Argent and Vert and thereon a Red dragon passant pendent by a Golden chain from the neck of each supporter. Granted 25 February 1907 and augmented 19 October 1956. Motto 1st Deffro Mae'n Ddydd (Awake It Is Day) 2nd Y Ddraig Goch Ddyry Cychwyn (The Red Dragon Shall Lead)

== See also ==
- Cardiff Bay
- Flat Holm
