= Rodney Berman =

British politician (born 1969)

Doctor Rodney Berman OBE
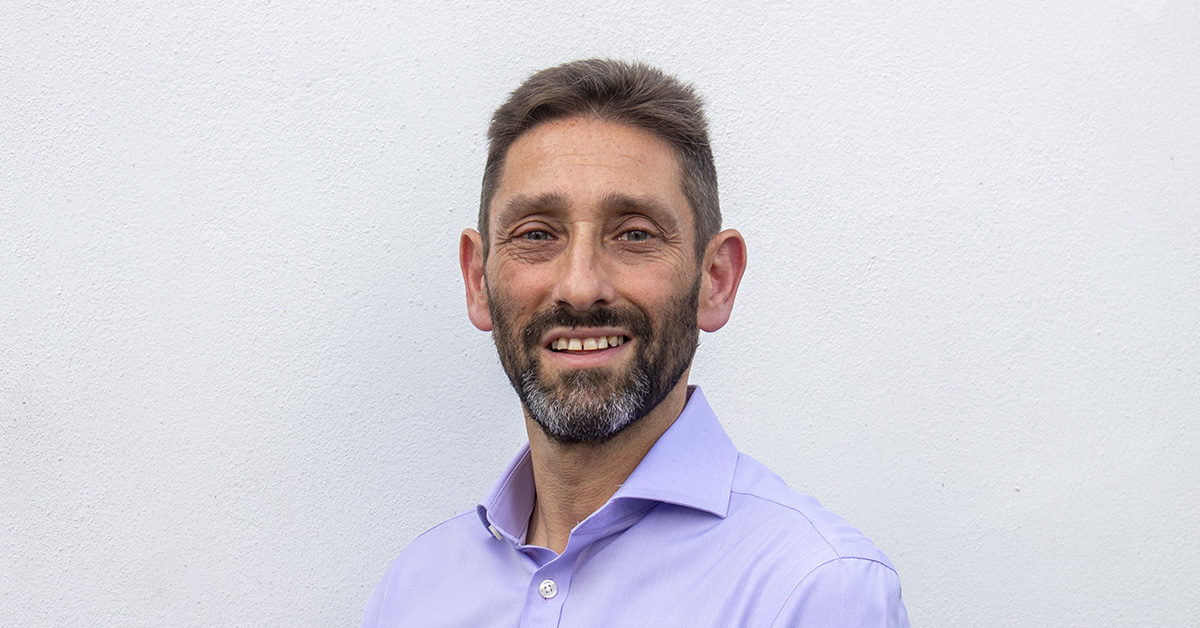
- Berman in 2021

Cardiff Councillor for Penylan
- incumbent
- Assumed office 2017

Leader of Cardiff Council
- In office 2004–2012
- Preceded by: Russell Goodway
- Succeeded by: Heather Joyce

Cardiff Councillor for Plasnewydd
- In office 2004-2012

Personal details
- Born: Rodney Simon Berman; 1969 (age 56–57) Glasgow, Scotland
- Party: Liberal Democrat
- Spouse: Nick Speed (m. 2006)
- Education: University of Glasgow (BSc, PhD)
- Scientific career
- Fields: Pharmacology, physiology
- Workplaces: University of Wales College of Medicine; British Medical Association
- Thesis: Modulation of Endothelial Barrier Function (1994)

Rodney Simon Berman OBE is a Liberal Democrat politician, currently a councillor for the Penylan ward of Cardiff. He was formerly a councillor for Plasnewydd ward, and was also leader of Cardiff Council between 2004 and 2012.

== Early life and education ==
Born and raised in Glasgow, Berman attended Woodfarm High School before studying pharmacology at the University of Glasgow, graduating with a BSc and a PhD. At university, he was involved in student politics and helped run Glasgow University Liberal Democrats. In 1994, he moved to Wales for a post-doctoral research fellowship at the University of Wales, College of Medicine, now part of Cardiff University.

== Political career ==
Berman stood for election to Parliament as Welsh Liberal Democrat candidate for Rhondda and Cardiff South and Penarth in 1997 and 2001, respectively, coming third on each occasion. His agent for the Rhondda seat was Professor Russell Deacon.

In 2004 Berman became leader of a minority administration on Cardiff Council. In 2006, Berman was the first winner of the Local Politician of the Year award.

The local elections of 2008 saw the Liberal Democrats increase their representation, winning new seats in the east (Trowbridge), west (Llandaff) and south of the city (Butetown). They were still in a minority on the council so they made a deal to run the Cardiff Council jointly with Plaid Cymru, under Berman's leadership.

In the 2012 council elections, the Liberal Democrats lost control of Cardiff Council to Welsh Labour, and Berman also lost his seat after two recounts.

Berman was appointed Officer of the Order of the British Empire (OBE) in the 2013 New Year Honours for services to local government and the community in Cardiff.

Berman returned to local politics to fight the 2017 Cardiff Council election and succeeded in securing a seat on the council, representing the Penylan Ward.

At the 2021 Senedd election, he was the Lib Dem candidate for Cardiff Central, coming second to Jenny Rathbone. He also stood on the list vote for the South Wales Central region. He stood for election in the Cardiff East constituency for the 2024 UK general election, coming second with 17.2% of the vote. He stood in the 2026 Senedd election in the Caerdydd Ffynnon Taf constituency but was not elected.

Berman was campaign manager for former Member of the Senedd and Minister Baroness Jenny Randerson (1948–2025) and saw her as a "terrific mentor" in his political career.

== Personal life ==
In August 2006, Berman entered into a civil partnership with his partner, former ITV News journalist Nick Speed. He is Jewish.

In addition to being a councillor, since 2013, Berman has been working as senior policy executive at the British Medical Association, which involves "providing policy support and advice to doctors".
