= Whitchurch & Tongwynlais =

Coordinates: 51.520°N 3.228°W

Whitchurch & Tongwynlais ward
- Electoral ward
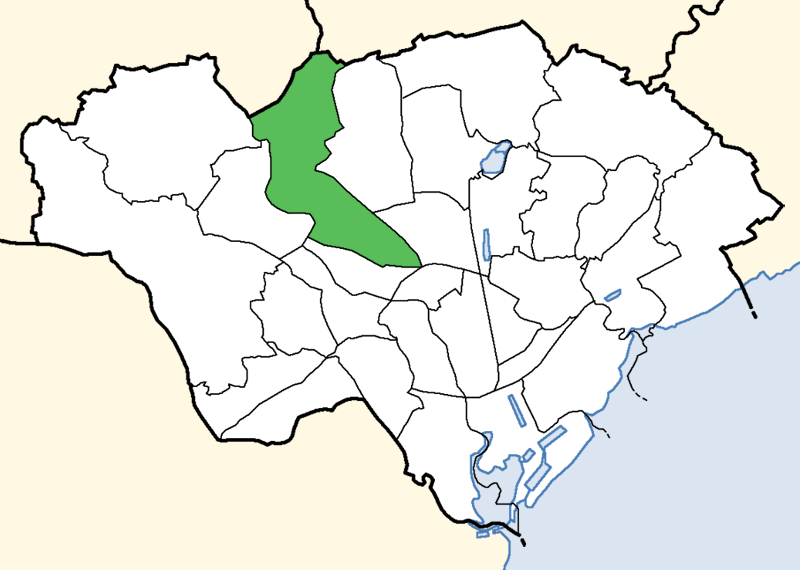
- Location of Whitchurch & Tongwynlais ward within Cardiff
- Population: 17,595 (2001 census)
- OS grid reference: ST181780
- Principal area: Cardiff
- Country: Wales
- Sovereign state: United Kingdom
- Post town: CARDIFF
- Postcode district: CF15, CF14
- Dialling code: +44-29
- UK Parliament: Cardiff North (Labour)
- Senedd Cymru – Welsh Parliament: Cardiff North (Labour)
- Councillors: 4 (all Labour)

Whitchurch & Tongwynlais (Welsh: Yr Eglwys Newydd a Thongwynlais) is an electoral ward of Cardiff, Wales. It covers some or all of the following areas: Coryton, Tongwynlais and Whitchurch in the parliamentary constituency of Cardiff North. It is bounded by Caerphilly county borough to the north; Rhiwbina and Heath to the east; Llandaff North to the south; Radyr & Morganstown and Pentyrch to the west.

== Government ==
=== Senedd ===
Whitchurch & Tongwynlais is in the Cardiff North constituency for the Senedd. Since 2011 it has been represented by Julie Morgan MS, a member of the Labour Party

=== Houses of Parliament ===
The Westminster constituency of Cardiff North was represented by the Conservative Party's Craig Williams MP until the 2017 election, when Labour's Anna McMorrin won the seat.

=== Local Government ===
The ward has elected four councillors to the post-1996 Cardiff Council and, prior to that, four (Conservative) councillors to Cardiff City Council since the ward's creation in 1983.

Representation 1983 – date
Election	Conservative	Labour
1983	4	0
1987	4	0
1991	4	0
1995	0	4
1999	1	3
2004	3	1
2008	4	0
2012	0	4
2017	4	0
2022	0	4
