= Neil McEvoy =

Welsh politician (born 1970)

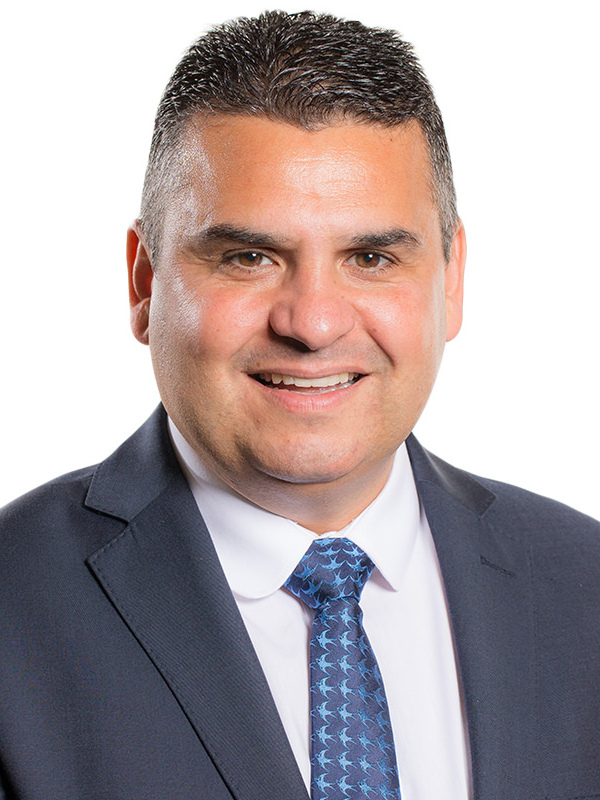
- Official Welsh Assembly portrait, 2016

Leader of Propel
- Incumbent
- Assumed office 15 January 2020
- Preceded by: Party established

Member of the Senedd for South Wales Central
- In office 5 May 2016 – 29 April 2021
- Preceded by: Leanne Wood
- Succeeded by: Heledd Fychan

Cardiff Councillor for Fairwater
- Incumbent
- Assumed office 1 May 2008
- Preceded by: Michael Costas-Michael

Deputy Leader of Cardiff Council
- In office 16 May 2008 – 3 May 2012; Serving with Judith Woodman

Cardiff Councillor for Riverside
- In office 6 May 1999 – 10 June 2004
- Preceded by: J. Singh
- Succeeded by: J. Austin

Personal details
- Born: 4 April 1970 (age 56) Cardiff, Wales
- Party: Propel (2020–present)
- Other political affiliations: Independent (2018–2020); Plaid Cymru (2003–2018); Labour (until 2003)
- Spouse: Ceri McEvoy
- Children: 1 daughter
- Profession: Politician
- Website: neilmcevoy.wales

Neil John McEvoy (born 1970) is a Welsh nationalist politician, serving as leader of Propel since 2020, and a Cardiff Councillor for the Fairwater ward since 2008.

Additionally, McEvoy was a Member of the Senedd (MS) for the South Wales central region from 2016 to 2021.

He was elected to the Senedd, then known as the Welsh Assembly, on the Plaid Cymru regional list, under the Additional Member System, and later sat as an independent. In February 2020, he announced that he was forming a new political party, the Welsh National Party, later renamed as Propel.

== Early life and career ==
McEvoy was born in 1970 in Cardiff. His maternal grandfather was a Yemeni who came to Cardiff to work on the docks, and he has spoken about the contribution that Yemenis made to Britain in the Second World War. McEvoy previously trained and worked as a teacher of modern languages.

== Political career ==
McEvoy was elected to Cardiff Council as Welsh Labour Councillor for Riverside in 1999 and later became vice-chair of the Labour council group, he defected to Plaid Cymru in 2003. He lost his seat in Riverside in 2004, but was elected in 2008 in the Fairwater ward. He then became Deputy Leader of Cardiff Council between 2008 and 2012 under a Liberal Democrat-Plaid Cymru coalition administration. In 2012 he was re-elected to represent Fairwater.

McEvoy stood as a Plaid Cymru candidate in the 2007 National Assembly for Wales election in Cardiff West.

In 2012, as a councillor, McEvoy presented a petition in the Welsh language, resulting in an argument with representatives of other parties. Despite protests, McEvoy declined to speak in English at the council meeting.

In September 2012, despite Plaid's decision not to put forward any candidates for Police and Crime Commissioner (PCC) elections, McEvoy said that he wanted to stand for the PCC for South Wales Police. McEvoy did not stand, Plaid did not put forward a candidate, and subsequently former MP Alun Michael won the position for Welsh Labour.

=== Member of the Senedd ===
In July 2015, McEvoy was narrowly beaten by Plaid Cymru Party leader Leanne Wood in the contest for first place on the party list for the 2016 Assembly election, but gained second place. In May 2016, he was elected as Member of the Senedd, then known as the Welsh Assembly, on the Plaid Cymru regional list, under the Additional Member System.

McEvoy also stood as a constituency candidate for Cardiff West once more in the 2016 Assembly elections, which saw Plaid Cymru's share of the vote increase by 11.9%. The incumbent AM, Labour's Mark Drakeford, saw his majority reduced to 1,176 votes, with the Conservatives in third place. McEvoy was elected for the regional seat of South Wales Central.

After election to the Assembly, McEvoy continued to serve as a councillor on Cardiff Council, receiving the councillor's basic allowance of £13,300 in addition to the Senedd salary of £64,000. His Labour Party opponents described this as hypocrisy, saying that he had previously said it was wrong for people in public office to be a councillor and to work in another job. McEvoy later commented that there was a complete synergy between the two roles, making him more effective at both, and that he was donating his pay as a councillor to his community.

In the run-up to the 2017 Cardiff Council election, Wales Online described McEvoy as "arguably the most divisive frontline elected politician in Wales right now" who, despite being "at the forefront of an unprecedented growth of Plaid support and membership in Cardiff" had a "sometimes difficult relationship" with his adopted party, Plaid Cymru.

McEvoy has, contrary to the policy of Plaid Cymru, supported the continuation of the Right to Buy scheme in Wales. He opposed the Welsh Government's Children (Abolition of Defence of Reasonable Punishment) (Wales) Act 2020 which saw most forms of corporal punishment of children prohibited.

In August 2019 McEvoy gave an Assembly speech informing First Minister of Wales Mark Drakeford of costs of up to £245 to change lightbulbs under the Welsh Government Warm Homes/Arbed Am Byth scheme. Drakeford responded to the claims with a letter stating that costs of £245 represented work including lighting fitting in "not less than 80% of all fixed outlets" in homes, as opposed to £245 for individual lightbulb fittings. McEvoy responded by accusing the First Minister of discussing the matter with Arbed Am Byth alone, and not investigating contractors directly. He stated that he was unable to disclose details of his "whistle-blowers" to the First Minister, but would be contacting the Auditor General for Wales.

Also in August 2019, McEvoy was included in a list of the AMs with the largest budgets for staff and constituency office costs in the Assembly. He was described as budgeting £115,865 for his office, which McEvoy described as necessary to deal with "an enormous amount of casework" and stated his "office is far busier than the local Westminster MP". His budget was the largest of any AMs in the Assembly.

==== 2019 Plaid Cymru conference debates ====
McEvoy contributed to the debate around the Plaid Cymru conference, which was scheduled for 4 and 5 October 2019 in Swansea Grand Theatre. He voiced opinions on matters including the election for a Chair. Incumbent Chair Alun Ffred Jones, who presided over the party during McEvoy's disciplinary issues, was challenged by Dr Dewi Evans, an ally of McEvoy, who was nominated alongside seven other prospective party officials by McEvoy's home Plaid branch of West Cardiff. It was reported in July 2019 that the Plaid Cymru leadership feared a "Neil McEvoy takeover bid". Candidates nominated by the Cardiff West constituency party included a former barrister who had represented McEvoy, and others perceived[clarification needed] as allies.

Dr Evans argued for reform of the party's extension system. In response to these proposals, Jones argued that the role of the Chair did not extend to re-admitting expelled members, and that the Plaid National Conference would need to discuss issues such as McEvoy's membership of the party. Plaid leader Adam Price, in an op-ed for Nation.Cymru, criticised "reports of a concerted attempt by some non-members of Plaid Cymru to intervene in our democracy", a criticism which some commentators said was a reference to McEvoy's efforts during the Plaid conference to replace incumbent Chair Jones. Plaid AM Rhun ap Iorwerth tweeted regarding McEvoy "Don’t misunderstand me. His personality is a problem, but it goes far beyond ‘not liking [McEvoy]. If anyone – for reasons of personality or otherwise – bullies, undermines, threatens, challenges legally… time after time... it’s a problem."

=== Foundation of the Welsh National Party ===
In July 2019 McEvoy withdrew his application to rejoin Plaid Cymru. In February 2020, he announced that he was forming a new political party, the Welsh National Party, and that he had registered the name with the Electoral Commission. The launch of the party was planned for April 2020.

On 6 May, following the threat of legal action from Plaid Cymru over its registration of the new party's name, the Electoral Commission removed the name "Welsh National" Party from the register of political parties, and stated that a second application to register a different name would have to be made. In response, McEvoy described the decision as representing "a shameful day for democracy" and said that the party was seeking 'urgent legal advice' as well as a statement from the Speaker's Committee, who oversee the Electoral Commission. On 15 January 2021, the name "Welsh Nation Party" was also rejected. McEvoy said "we will be known as Propel from now on".

==== 2021 Senedd election ====
In July 2019, McEvoy's membership dispute with the party became particularly acute, given his stated intention to stand again in Cardiff West in the 2021 Senedd election, challenging Labour’s Mark Drakeford, now First Minister. Plaid viewed the seat as an important target, given the close result in 2016, and feared that McEvoy would split the nationalist vote, if both he and a Plaid Cymru candidate were to stand.

In the election, McEvoy came fourth in the constituency with 3,473 votes (9.5%). He was also Propel's lead candidate on the regional list, though the party finished seventh overall, polling 5,552 votes (2.2%).

As he was not re-elected, McEvoy was entitled to a payout given to Senedd members who lost their seats, receiving £28,187.

==== Post-Senedd ====
He was reelected councillor in Fairwater in the 2022 Cardiff Council election.

At the 2024 general election, McEvoy was the only Propel candidate to stand. He took 1,041 votes (2.3%), coming seventh in Cardiff West.

At the 2026 Senedd election he will stand as a Propel candidate in Caerdydd Penarth.

== Controversies ==
In November 2011 in a Facebook post, McEvoy accused the charity Welsh Women's Aid of "publicly funded child abuse" and claimed they supported women in breaking court orders on fathers' access to children. He was subsequently suspended by Plaid Cymru, and after investigation was allowed to return. McEvoy apologised for the words he used, but did not withdraw the allegations.

In Council elections in May 2011, Welsh Labour ward opponent Michael Michael distributed leaflets of Only Fools and Horses character Del Boy with McEvoy's face imposed on them. McEvoy subsequently sued Michael for libel, but withdrew the case in December 2015. By withdrawing the case, McEvoy became liable for Michael's legal costs, and in January 2016, McEvoy agreed to pay Michael £120,000 in respect of those costs. The sum represented a quarter of the cost of the preliminary issues, and all costs after April 2013. McEvoy paid an initial sum of £50,000, and agreed a payment plan with Michael and his lawyers, which included Michael having a legal charge imposed on McEvoy's home.

In March 2017 a Cardiff Council tribunal found a comment that McEvoy made to a council officer after a tenant's eviction hearing in 2015 amounted to "bullying behaviour". The Adjudication Panel for Wales ruled he broke Cardiff council's code of conduct but did not bring the council into disrepute. After the hearing, Mr McEvoy described the panel proceedings as a "farce", but Plaid chairman Alun Ffred Jones said the matter was "serious because it involves bullying". McEvoy was subsequently suspended from the Plaid Cymru Senedd group on 7 March 2017 and reinstated two weeks later. A Plaid Cymru disciplinary panel was to consider the complaints later in the Autumn.

In September 2017, McEvoy was suspended again, after a unanimous decision by Plaid's Assembly group, following accusations that he had undermined Plaid Cymru's policy on council housing. In December 2018 McEvoy was referred to the Assembly Standards Commissioner after he was accused by his former office manager, Michael Deem, of misusing Assembly funds for printing leaflets and recruiting staff for party political, rather than Assembly work. Deem refused to comment on media reports, and McEvoy responded by stating that he "will continue to ask the difficult questions that some people don't want asked".

In January 2018 he was expelled from the Plaid Cymru group in the Welsh Assembly, with a spokesperson stating that "his ongoing behaviour has left Assembly Member colleagues feeling undermined and demoralised". He then sat as an independent.

McEvoy posted to Twitter in March 2018, and later deleted, a response to an earlier post about former Plaid leader and AM Leanne Wood with an image of himself and Dafydd Elis-Thomas wearing boxing gloves outside the Senedd. The tweet was captioned "we're ready for her", and was deleted after AMs including Plaid minister Bethan Sayed said the tweet was "absolutely not funny". Matthew Ford, a senior advisor to McEvoy, later came forward to state he had posted the image without McEvoy's prior knowledge, to promote a "cross-party boxing event with the minister for sport".

It was announced on 27 January 2019 that McEvoy's temporary expulsion from Plaid Cymru had been reviewed and cut by six months. In July 2019, McEvoy was again investigated for allegedly intimidating behaviour towards a care home worker. McEvoy contended that the case involved a child who had suffered "the worst case I've come across in 30 years". The investigation by the Public Services Ombudsman for Wales came during McEvoy's request in June to be re-admitted to the party, following over a year outside it. The Plaid Membership, Discipline and Standards Committee was described as "evenly split" during deliberations into the case. However shortly after, the committee's panel saw "two instances of unauthorised disclosure" of information which stated the panel had failed to reach a decision. The news leak led to the party deciding to disband the panel and form a new panel with new members.

As a result, McEvoy withdrew his application to re-join Plaid Cymru, and in a letter accused two members of the Membership, Discipline and Standards Committee panel of holding "prejudiced views about" him, as well as complaining of "malicious" leaks intended to bring down "a non-compliant panel". Plaid AM Helen Mary Jones however stated that the process was fair, and that the issue had consumed too much of "our time and our resources". She has indicated the Party would likely contact McEvoy through its solicitors regarding his claims. McEvoy is believed to have withdrawn his application due to party rules which state that if his application had been rejected in 2019, he would have been unable to reapply for a further five years.

Senedd Commissioner for Standards Sir Roderick Evans resigned on 11 November 2019 after audio transcripts were published containing what McEvoy described as "bias", "really sexist views" about "female lawyers" as well as comments that former Plaid Cymru leader Leanne Wood should "wind her neck in". The transcripts were quoted in the chamber by Assembly Brexit Party leader Mark Reckless, who later withdrew the comments on the request of the speaker, Elin Jones. The speaker subsequently ordered a security sweep of the assembly estate. McEvoy always stated he was the source of the recordings, which he said were made on his mobile phone in meeting rooms in the Senedd. Sir Roderick said McEvoy's conduct was "wholly unacceptable", and Jones requested that South Wales Police investigate the recordings.

On 2 December 2020 he was excluded from Senedd proceedings for 21 calendar days as well as being barred from Senedd buildings and having his pay docked after a Senedd Committee found him to have breached Senedd rules following an altercation with Labour MS Mick Antoniw where he behaved in a threatening and intimidatory way and employed physical and verbal aggression to do so.

In 2021, Cardiff Magistrates' Court issued McEvoy with a single justice procedure notice for breaching COVID-19 Alert Level 4 restrictions. McEvoy was accused of distributing election leaflets in February 2021, which was prohibited because of coronavirus legislation. McEvoy denied the allegation. A judge dismissed the case on the 21 October 2021 because the prosecution had made mistakes in the preparation of the case.

== Personal life ==
McEvoy lives in Cardiff with his wife Ceri. He has a daughter.

Senedd
Preceded by Leanne Wood	Member of the Senedd for South Wales Central; 2016 – 2021	Succeeded by Heledd Fychan
