= Russell Goodway =

British politician

Russell Vivian Goodway OBE (born 23 December 1955) is a Welsh Labour Party councillor for Ely, Cardiff; and the former Lord Mayor of Cardiff and former CEO of Cardiff Chamber of Commerce. He was Britain's youngest council leader when he led South Glamorgan County Council in 1992.

== Background ==
Goodway was born in St Athan, Glamorgan, at the RAF Hospital. He was brought up in nearby Rhoose. He went to Barry Boys' Comprehensive School before gaining a degree in economics and politics at University College, Swansea. One of his ambitions was to become a Church in Wales vicar, before he entered politics "by mistake" in 1985.

== Career ==
Goodway became a community councillor in Rhoose at the age of 21. He was first elected to South Glamorgan County Council in 1985 and became Leader in 1992, the youngest county council leader in Britain at the time. South Glamorgan Council was replaced in Cardiff by Cardiff Council in 1996.

He was, for a short period at the turn of the 21st century, the highest paid council leader in Great Britain, until he agreed to cut his £58,000 salary under pressure from the Welsh Government.

The "disastrous showing" for Labour at the Pentwyn by-election in September 2003 (with a Liberal Democrat landslide victory) led to a local vote of 'no confidence' in Goodway by the Cardiff Central Labour Party, with a further vote of no confidence discussed by the county Labour Party in October. Following the Labour Party's loss of control of Cardiff Council at the May 2004 Local Elections, Goodway resigned as leader of the group, adding that Welsh First Minister Rhodri Morgan wanted Goodway to be beaten by his independent opponent.

Remaining an elected councillor for Ely, Goodway was subsequently elected CEO of the Cardiff Chamber of Commerce in late 2004. In late 2007/early 2008, the chamber financially collapsed spectacularly following at overpaid training grant from ELWa of £500,000, which could not be repaid thanks to interest payments totalling £500,000 and other debts of a further £1million. After all 35 staff were immediately made redundant, it was subsequently liquidated.

In 2008 Goodway subsequently insisted he would not seek the then vacant leadership of the Labour group on Cardiff Council.

In 2012, Labour regained control of Cardiff Council, under Heather Joyce' leadership. Goodway was appointed Cabinet Member for Economic Development and Finance in Joyce' cabinet. During his time in that role he led the council's negotiations with development firm Rightacres, which established the Central Square partnership. Following Joyce' resignation as Leader in March 2014, Goodway was not appointed to the new cabinet under Phil Bale's leadership. He has been cited by the BBC saying that " I have had to make some difficult decisions but I believe I have put forward a team that can contribute to drive forward economic development, improve standards of education and skills as well as focusing on citizen engagement, improving performance and delivering on the co-operative council agenda".

Following the May 2017 Welsh Local Government elections, Goodway was appointed Cabinet Member for Investment and Development.

He was appointed Officer of the Order of the British Empire (OBE) in the 2020 New Year Honours for services to local government.
