= Norma Procter (environmentalist) =

British environmental campaigner

Norma Catherine Procter MBE (née Turner) is a British environmental campaigner, local historian, novelist, poet, and painter associated with environmental activism and heritage preservation in South Wales, particularly in Gwaelod-y-Garth,and surrounding areas of Cardiff, Wales. In 2011 she was appointed a Member of the Order of the British Empire (MBE) for services to the environment and to the community in Gwaelod-y-Garth.

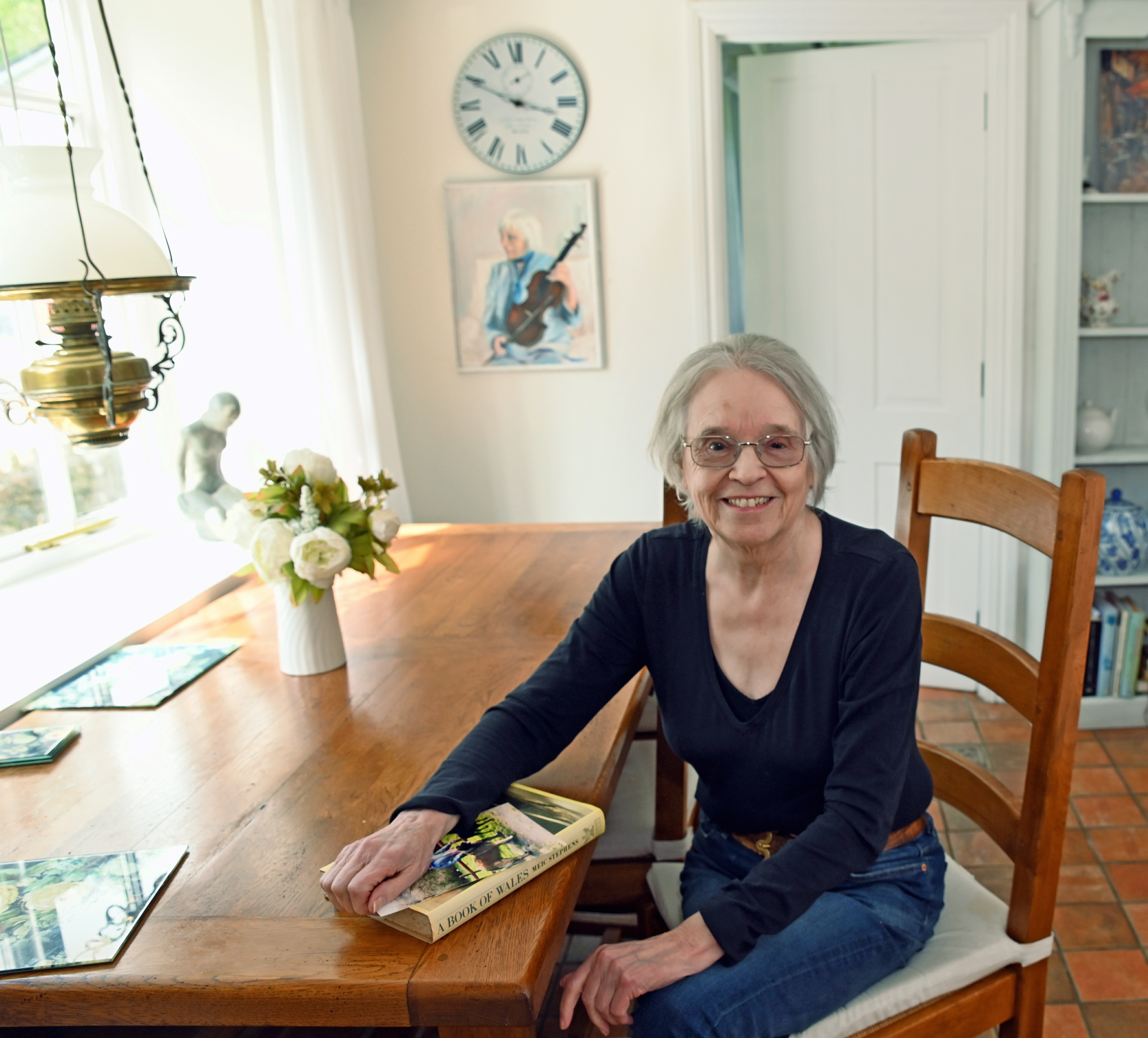
Norma Procter MBE.

== Early life ==
Procter was born in Norfolk, England. After studying at the Guildhall School of Music and Drama she moved to South Wales, when her husband Tom Procter was employed as a trumpeter in the BBC Welsh Symphony Orchestra (now known at BBC National Orchestra of Wales). She was a part-time lecturer in voice at the Welsh College of Music and Drama.

== Environmental and heritage activism ==
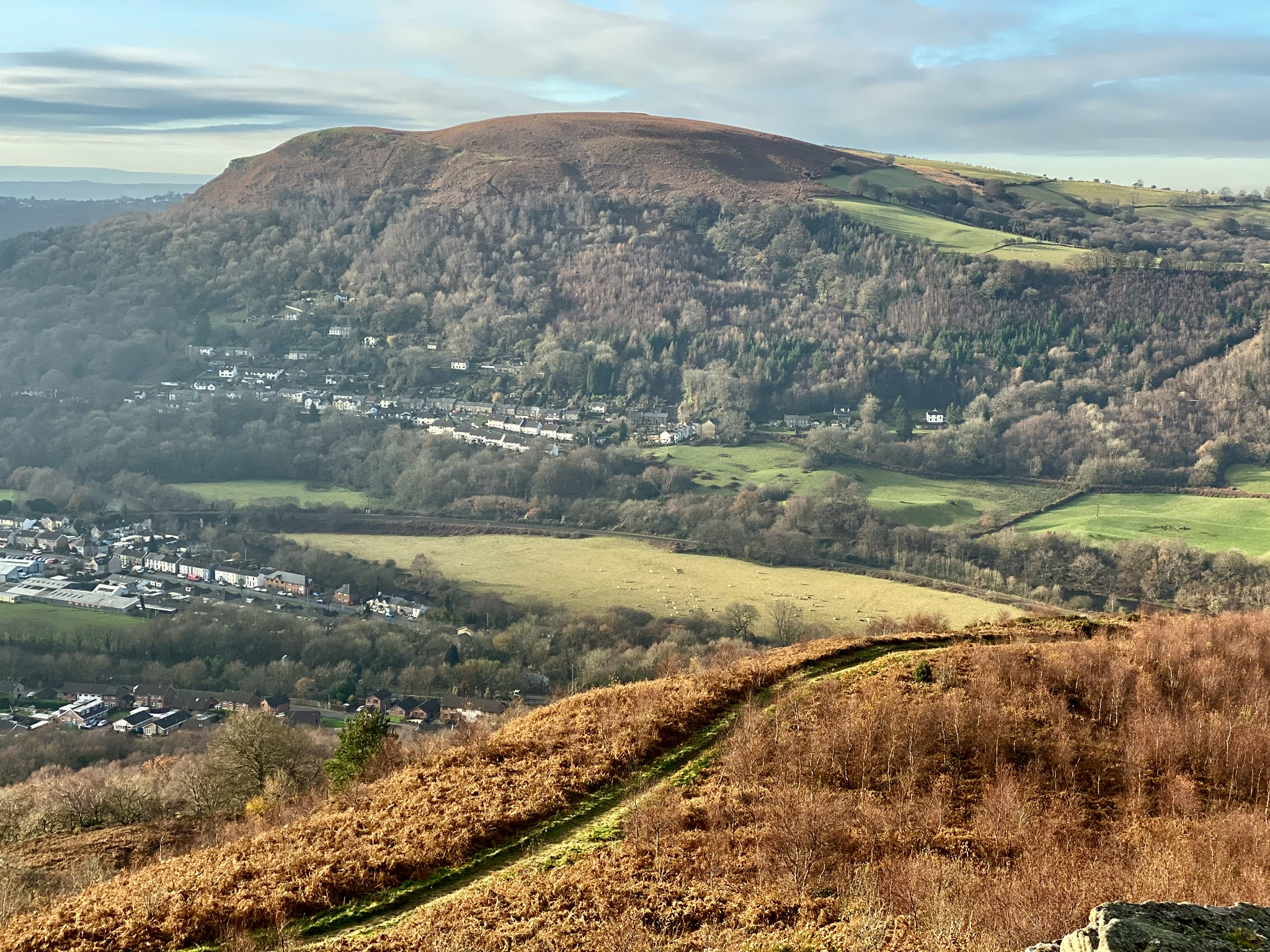
Garth Hill, Gwaelod y Garth

Since 1989 Procter has been active in environmental and heritage issues affecting Gwaelod-y-Garth and the surrounding area including the woodland.

Procter brought to light a forgotten mine disaster of historical importance – the 1875 Lan Disaster where child miners lost their lives with the men. Efforts by Procter and a few local campaigners led to the installation of a memorial plaque commemorating the victims. Wales Online subsequent coverage noted that the disaster had previously received little recognition before renewed attention from the community.

As Co-ordinator of Community Concern, Procter was involved in campaigning relating to radioactive discharges and nuclear waste affecting South Wales. These issues were highlighted in national media coverage addressing long-term environmental risks.

Concern round the radioactive discharges of tritium (3H ) and carbon 14 (14C ) from Amersham International were highlighted by Community Concern. Procter set up a meeting at County Hall with Wayne David, MP. Chair. A programme for this public conference on environmental and nuclear issues lists Procter as coordinator, with invited speakers including Professor Alice Stewart, Sir Frank Barnaby and barrister Hugo Charlton, Max Wallis from Friends of the Earth and other speakers. It was entitled "The Cardiff Seminar: Transparency and Participation on the Scientific Controversy of LLR and Health" and Glamorgan Archives houses full recording and documents.

Leading an earlier campaign against installation of an Asphalt plant in the local quarry a public meeting was set up on Friday, 22 April 1994 organised by Procter for residents to raise questions. As reported by Isobel Bretherton, Procter's home became the Headquarters for the campaign and where multinational company Redlands Aggregates CEO met with experts from Community Concern on 23 May 1994 to hear reasons for the objection.

‘A Risk Assessment and Impact of the Proposed Asphalt Coating Plant written' by Dr Barry Ellis, Dr. Royden Hunt, Dr Trevor Jones, Dr Ken Mills, Dr Margart Price and Alwyn Jones (Glamorgan Archives) and prepared by Procter resulted in an 140 page document underlining concerns. After a long meeting, just after midnight, Redlands shelved their application for the new plant.

Later Procter led the campaign to protect the Ancient Beech woodland on the Lesser Garth when threatened by Quarry extension. The Queen Mother lent her support. The campaign was a success, acknowledged in a letter from Clarence House conveying the message that the Queen Mother was pleased that the ancient woodland had been saved from the potential quarry extension.

The success of the campaign brought attention to the area’s rich industrial heritage, and led to recognition and listing of the historically significant iron working caverns within the Lesser Garth. These Victorian caverns were saved from the potential destruction by quarry extensions, and an article by David Keys, archaeological correspondent for The Independent had warned that these “buried treasures” were under threat from development. In his article Keys noted the importance of the area, referencing prehistoric caves in the Lesser Garth with evidence of neolithic occupation, possibly a burial site, and both late Bronze Age and Roman occupation. He also referenced the "spectacular" underground iron working caverns, the remains of a nineteenth century iron-ore mining.

The area had already gained significance when director Christopher Monger, from nearby Taff's Well, wrote the 1995 film The Englishman Who Went up a Hill but Came down a Mountain based on the area's history.

== Honours ==
In 2011 Procter was awarded an MBE for her services to the environment, including running a successful 20-year-long campaign against proposals to extend a quarry hat would have inflicted damage to an ancient woodland and important industrial heritage.

Procter was unable to attend the investiture at Buckingham Palace. Instead, Lord Lieutenant of South Glamorgan Peter Beck made a formal presentation in her home.

In the citation from Buckingham Palace, as read out by the Lord Lieutenant of South Glamorgan, and quoted by Kathryn Williams in the South Wales Echo Procter was noted as a “Great champion of green spaces and environmental safety” in an area of Wales which is under considerable development pressure. Beck went on thank to her "dedication, ingenuity and vision."

Williams goes on to mention that the award recognised how she had consistently been approached by people in the area to help with causes, including stopping radioactive storage and discharges into the environment from a local industry, GE (then Amersham).l This led to three hearings at the European Parliament where the discharges were ruled illegal.

== Artist, Author & Campaigner ==
Procter puts her local knowledge into novels and film scripts. She works with the local school and local choirs to hold memorial services to honour victims of the 1875 explosion at the Llan Colliery (also written as Lan Colliery). The drift mine was owned by the Thomas William Booker-Blakemore enterprise in South Wales in the late nineteenth century and once supplied coal to the iron baron’s iron works at Pentyrch, its brick works and its tin works on the outskirts of Cardiff.

For this memorial work and Procter’s dedicated research into Welsh history, she was cited in the Welsh Parliament (Senedd) in the 90-second Statements on the 3rd December 2025 at 15.10 by Member of Parliament Rhys ab Owen to mark the 150th anniversary of the mining accident. Ab Owen concluded his speech with a quotation from the Lan Memorial Arch, "They take us from our cradles and work us to death."

It was after discovering in her cottage deeds that Abraham Phillips, overman killed at the Lan and accused of negligence, lived in the cottage where she now lives, Procter carried out extensive research into the mining history of the area using census and other historical records. It resulted in her novel, "The House of Abraham Phillips." Her work transcribing the lost 1875 Inquest Report into the Lan disaster from verbatim reports in archived newspaper is help by Glamorgan Archives.

== Publications ==
Amongst various books in 2012, The House of Abraham Phillips a historical novel based on the Lan Colliery disaster of 6 December 1875. The narrative follows the family of colliery owner Abraham Phillips and explores themes of industrial responsibility, guilt, and the social consequences of catastrophe including how the inquest into the accident led by William Galloway changed mining practices and introduced the practice of damping the air to help prevent explosions. As mining inspector Galloway reported his findings to an inquest where he shared his evidence that as both the timbers and miners furthest from the point of ignition were the most severely burned, it reinforced his theory that in dry mines coal dust spreads the explosion. For his innovate work on coal-mining safety he received the degree of Doctor of Science from the University of Wales, the Shaw Gold Medal of the Royal Society of Arts, and at the age of 83, in 1924 he was knighted.
