= List of scheduled monuments in Cardiff =

Cardiff is the capital and largest city in Wales. The county, which takes in a number of smaller settlements around the city, has 28 scheduled monuments. These include sites from every period of Welsh history, from the Neolithic onwards. With four hillforts, six castles and six coastal/port sites, they reflect Cardiff's military and strategic role within South Wales. All but one of the sites on this list are within the historic county of Glamorgan. (A small part of the modern unitary authority area was formerly part of Monmouthshire.)

Scheduled monuments have statutory protection. The compilation of the list is undertaken by Cadw Welsh Historic Monuments, which is an executive agency of the National Assembly of Wales. The list of scheduled monuments below is supplied by Cadw with additional material from RCAHMW and Glamorgan-Gwent Archaeological Trust.

== Scheduled monuments in Cardiff ==
Image	Name	Site type	Community	Location	Details	Historic County	Period	SAM No & Refs
Cae-yr-Arfau burial chamber	Cae-yr-Arfau Burial Chamber	Chambered tomb	Pentyrch	51.5306°N 3.3317°W, ST077821	Two upright stones support a large slab of a Neolithic chambered tomb. Having been used in the past as a coal store, it is now overgrown in a garden	Glamorganshire	Prehistoric (Neolithic)	GM030
	Five Round Barrows on Garth Hill	Round barrow	Pentyrch	51.5436°N 3.2932°W, ST104835		Glamorganshire	Prehistoric	GM107
	Cooking Mound East of Taff Terrace	Burnt mound	Radyr and Morganstown	51.5126°N 3.2488°W, ST134800		Glamorganshire	Prehistoric	GM427
Photo from within Caerau Hillfort, looking toward southern perimeter	Caerau Hillfort	Hillfort	Caerau, (also Ely)	51.4675°N 3.2484°W, ST133750	Hillfort of some 5 ha, with wooded ramparts. Within the Iron Age hillfort are a ruined church (13th century but possibly pre-Norman) and a castle ringwork. Featured in Time Team dig, April 2012	Glamorganshire	Prehistoric (Iron Age)	GM018
	Llwynda-Ddu Camp	Hillfort	Pentyrch	51.5209°N 3.2861°W, ST109810	A small iron age hillfort	Glamorganshire	Prehistoric	GM180
	Castle Field Camp E of Craig-Llywn	Hillfort	Pontprennau	51.5494°N 3.1486°W, ST204840		Glamorganshire	Prehistoric	GM066
	Wenallt Camp, Rhiwbina	Hillfort	Rhiwbina	51.5373°N 3.2239°W, ST152827		Glamorganshire	Prehistoric	GM097
Cardiff Castle from the Animal Wall	Cardiff Castle and Roman Fort	Fort	Castle	51.4824°N 3.1811°W, ST180765		Glamorganshire	Roman	GM171
	Pen y lan Roman Site	Settlement	Roath	51.5017°N 3.1563°W, ST198787		Glamorganshire	Roman	GM296
	Ely Roman Villa	Villa	Caerau	51.4777°N 3.2295°W, ST147761		Glamorganshire	Roman	GM205
Medieval cross in Llandaff Cathedral	Cross in Llandaff Cathedral	Cross	Llandaff	51.4956°N 3.2176°W, ST155781		Glamorganshire	Early Medieval	GM115
Leckwith Bridge	Leckwith Bridge	Bridge	Canton, (also Michaelston)	51.4699°N 3.212°W, ST159752		Glamorganshire	Medieval	GM014
Outline of the demolished Blackfriars Priory	Blackfriars Priory (dominican), Bute Park	Friary	Castle	51.4832°N 3.1853°W, ST177766		Glamorganshire	Medieval	GM173
Ruins of Castell Morgraig	Castell Morgraig	Castle	Lisvane, (also Caerphilly)	51.5519°N 3.213°W, ST159843	(Site is on the border with Caerphilly)	Glamorganshire	Medieval	GM031
The ruined medieval bell tower at Llandaff Cathedral	Llandaff Cathedral Bell Tower	Bell Tower	Llandaff	51.4953°N 3.2186°W, ST154780		Glamorganshire	Medieval	GM013
Ruins of Bishop's Palace. Llandaff, Cardiff	Old Bishop's Palace, Llandaff	Bishop's Palace	Llandaff	51.4945°N 3.2172°W, ST155779		Glamorganshire	Medieval	GM073
St Mellons Churchyard Cross	St Mellons Churchyard Cross	Cross	Old St Mellons	51.5258°N 3.1134°W, ST228813		Monmouthshire	Medieval	MM121
Morganstown Castle Mound	Morganstown Castle Mound	Motte	Radyr and Morganstown	51.5291°N 3.2579°W, ST128818		Glamorganshire	Medieval	GM256
Twmpath Castle	Twmpath Castle	Motte	Rhiwbina	51.5323°N 3.2213°W, ST153822		Glamorganshire	Medieval	GM017
Caer Castell Camp	Caer Castell Camp	Motte	Rumney	51.5167°N 3.1156°W, ST226803		Glamorganshire	Medieval	GM216
Castle Coch seen from Morganstown	Castell Coch	Castle	Tongwynlais	51.536°N 3.2549°W, ST130826		Glamorganshire	Medieval	GM206
Sea Defence at Peterstone Great Wharf	Relict Seawall on Rumney Great Wharf	Seawall	Trowbridge	51.4958°N 3.1008°W, ST236780		Glamorganshire	Post-Medieval/Modern	GM474
Flat Holm Canon	Three Palmerstonian Gun Batteries, Flat Holm	Battery	Butetown	51.3798°N 3.1216°W, ST220651		Glamorganshire	Post-Medieval/Modern	GM351
	Ely Tidal Harbour Coal Staithe Number One	Staithes	Grangetown	51.4478°N 3.1827°W, ST179727		Glamorganshire	Post-Medieval/Modern	GM583
	The Wreck of the "Louisa"	Boat	Grangetown	51.4592°N 3.1795°W, ST181740		Glamorganshire	Post-Medieval/Modern	GM553
	Queen Alexandra Dock Harbour Defence Gun Emplacement	Gun House	Butetown	51.452°N 3.1564°W, ST197731		Glamorganshire	Post-Medieval/Modern	GM618
Melingriffith water pump	Melingriffith Water Pump	Pump	Whitchurch	51.5122°N 3.2378°W, ST142799		Glamorganshire	Post-Medieval/Modern	GM312
	Flat Holm Coastal and Anti-aircraft Defences	Battery	Butetown	51.3765°N 3.1214°W, ST220647		Glamorganshire	Post-Medieval/Modern	GM595

Scheduled monuments in Cardiff, Wales.
=Prehistoric =Roman =Early Medieval
=Medieval =Post-Medieval/Modern

== See also ==
- Listed buildings in Cardiff
- List of Cadw properties
- List of castles in Wales
- List of hill forts in Wales
- Historic houses in Wales
- List of monastic houses in Wales
- List of museums in Wales
- List of Roman villas in Wales
