= Craig yr Allt =

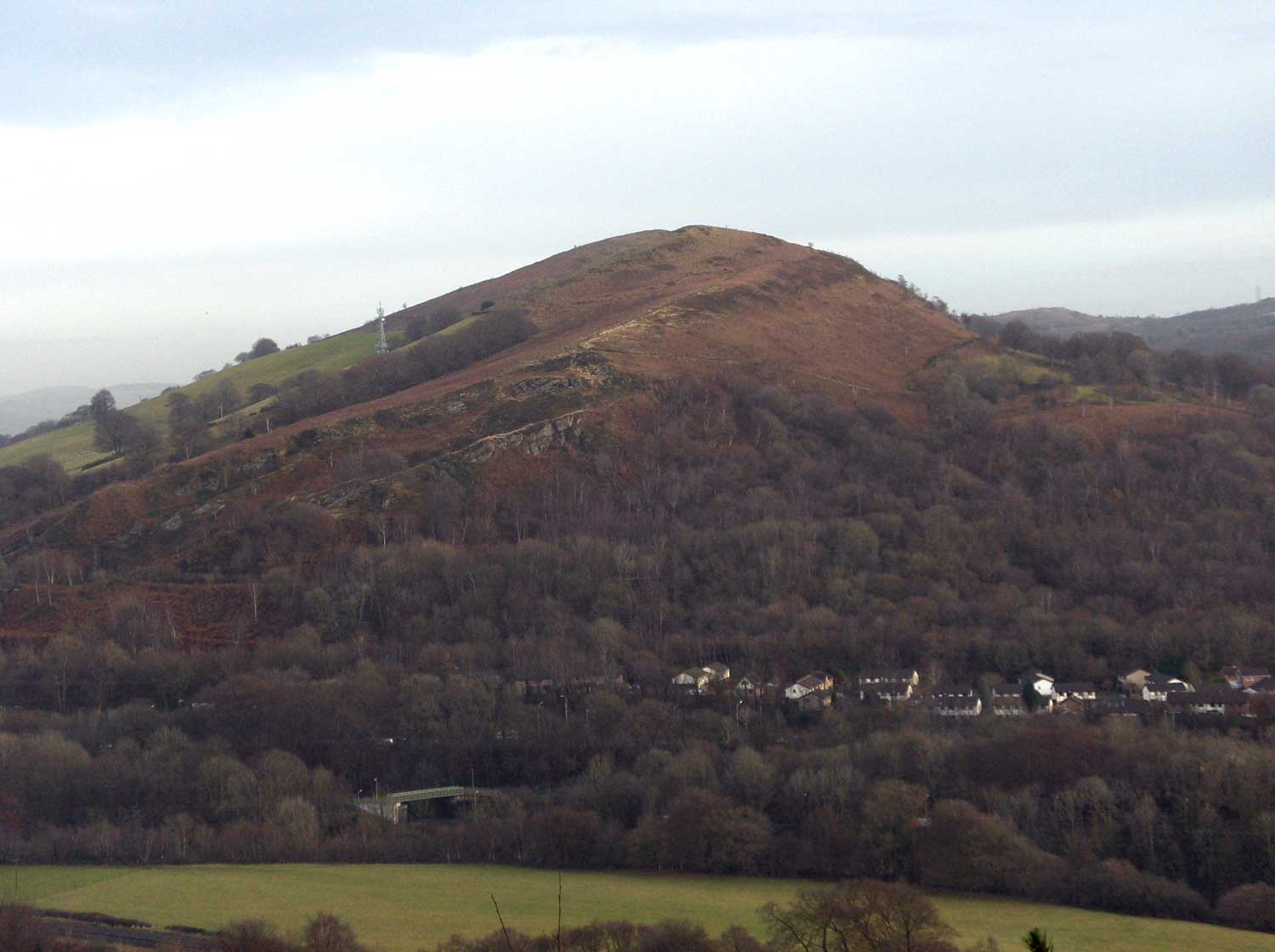
- Craig yr Allt, seen from Garth Hill

Highest point
- Elevation: 273 m (896 ft)
- Prominence: 154 m (505 ft)
- Listing: Marilyn
- Coordinates: 51°33′25.9″N 3°15′0.13″W

Geography
- Location: Rhondda Cynon Taff, Wales
- OS grid: ST133850

Craig yr Allt is a hill in South Wales, overlooking Caerphilly to the east and the villages of Nantgarw and Taff's Well to the west.

The Taff Ely Ridgeway Walk passes over the hill.
