= Garth View =

Garth View may refer to:

- A hillside of the Garth Hill in South Wales composed of the communities of Llantwit Fardre and Pentyrch
- A locality in Bedwas, Caerphilly in South Wales
- A historic cottage in Bolton
