= English-language accents in film =

Use of regional accents of English in cinema

In film, English-language accents can be part of acting performances. Actors use dialect coaches to speak in an accent other than their own. Accents can vary by locality, socioeconomic status, ethnicity, and other factors.

== Dialect coaching ==
In the 1990s, dialect coaches became significant in the film industry as more filmmakers began employing them to train actors to speak in accents. The Los Angeles Times described the general training approach, "It's a process that involves repetition, studying audio- and videotapes, visits to locations where the characters live, along with breathing and vocal exercises." Coaches start "by breaking down the script phonetically" using the International Phonetic Alphabet, and since most actors are not familiar with the alphabet, the coaches use other approaches to train actors, such as word lists or tapes. Coaches often have archives of sample tapes to reference in their work. They are usually brought in during rehearsals, the post-production process, or emotional scenes that challenge an accepted performance. In the credits, they are usually listed as dialogue consultants. Often, actors will work with their coaches for several months pre-production. Most critics of film accents credit the amount of time spent training with the quality and effectiveness of the replicated accent.

== American accents ==
American accents became increasingly adopted by non-American actors by 2000. With many film-related opportunities available in the United States, actors trained to have American accents to be more competitive. At the 72nd Academy Awards honoring films of 1999, all non-American actors nominated in the four acting categories portrayed American characters, including British actor Michael Caine, who won Best Supporting Actor for his role in The Cider House Rules. Another attribution to the trend is with films increasingly being co-financed by non-U.S. interests, film producers became more willing to cast non-American actors.

While actors in theatre were once traditionally trained to have a Mid-Atlantic accent, actors in film are instead trained to have a General American accent. Dialect coach Robert Easton said the Mid-Atlantic accent was "too semi-British" and opted for General American. Easton commended British actors in learning American accents, "[They] in general are very open to doing whatever is necessary to create the character, not only in terms of dialect, but in terms of body language, mannerisms and so forth. It's an oversimplification, but the English tend to try and use themselves to find and express the character, whereas Americans are more likely to use the character to express themselves."

== British accents ==
=== Cockney ===
Historian Stephen Shafer identifies actor Gordon Harker, active from 1921 until 1959, as "the leading British film expert on the portrayal of the Cockney", while BBC News recognised the skill of actor John Mills (active 1932–2004) in Cockney speech. Dialect coach Robert Blumenfeld highlighted as an "excellent" cinematic example of Cockney speech the performances of Peter Sellers and Irene Handl in I'm All Right Jack (1959). Dick Van Dyke made a widely criticised attempt at a Cockney accent in Mary Poppins (1964). Van Dyke admitted the notoriety of his attempted accent and said that his British co-star Julie Andrews told him that he never got it right. Don Cheadle's Cockney accent in the remake of Ocean's Eleven and its sequels has been heavily criticised and compared to Van Dyke's.

=== Welsh ===
Because of the Welsh language's musical quality, the Welsh English accent is difficult for non-Welsh actors to master. The language has Celtic roots like Irish Gaelic but is more arcane. Dialect coach Penny Dyer said, "The Welsh language has the loosest intonation system in the whole of the British Isles." The accent is more difficult than Irish and Scottish. For How Green Was My Valley (1941), set in Wales but filmed in California, director John Ford avoided depicting the Welsh accent by casting British and Irish actors who spoke with Irish accents. For the British film The Englishman Who Went Up a Hill But Came Down a Mountain (1995), director Christopher Monger sought to capture the accent onscreen by having actors Colm Meaney, Tara FitzGerald and Ian Hart trained to sound like locals of South Wales.

In 2005, when Welsh-born actress Catherine Zeta-Jones encouraged Welsh singer-songwriter Charlotte Church to hide her native accent in pursuit of an acting career, Welsh film critic Gary Slaymaker and the Royal Academy of Dramatic Art both decried the need for the disguise. RADA's Dominic Kelly said, "We get a couple of Welsh accents through here every year, and there's now an increasing amount of demand for them. A few years ago it was Scottish, but now Welsh is very much in vogue. As long as people can understand what you are saying, the Welsh accent is a bonus. Voices need character and individuality." Slaymaker said, "It's unlikely they'll be able to tell the difference between a Welsh or Irish accent. It'll just be seen as colourful."

The 2007 film The Last Sin Eater, produced in the United States, depicted a Welsh-American community living in the Appalachian Mountains, but U.S. critics criticised the accented performances as inaccurate. Welsh-accented performances are uncommon in blockbuster films, though director Peter Jackson requested Welsh-born actor Luke Evans to use his native accent for his character in The Hobbit films. The decision also led to casting Welsh-accented actors to portray the character's family.

== Irish accents ==
Ronald Bergan in The Guardian assessed several performances using Irish accents in film. He said Marlon Brando had a "relatively accurate" accent in The Missouri Breaks (1976). Donald Clarke of The Irish Times commended the following non-Irish actors for their Irish accents in film: Cate Blanchett in Veronica Guerin (2003), Kate Hudson in About Adam (2000), Will Poulter in Glassland (2014), Paddy Considine in In America (2002), James McAvoy in Inside I'm Dancing (2004), Judi Dench in Philomena (2013), and Maggie Smith in The Lonely Passion of Judith Hearne (1987). Clarke also recognized the performances of Daniel Day-Lewis in My Left Foot (1989), In the Name of the Father (1993), and The Boxer (1997). He recognized Andrea Riseborough's performance in Shadow Dancer (2012) and Never Let Me Go (2010) and Anjelica Huston's performance in The Dead (1987) and Agnes Browne (1999).

Clarke was critical of Mark Strong's accent as Conor Cruise O'Brien in The Siege of Jadotville (2016). Bergan was critical of Robert Mitchum's accent in Ryan's Daughter (1970) and Sean Connery having a "faltering" accent in the films Darby O'Gill and the Little People (1959) and The Untouchables (1987), having "habitually refused to alter" his Scottish one. GQ's Dan Sheehan was also critical of Connery's accent in The Untouchables. Sheehan also found Tom Cruise's accent in Far and Away (1992) problematic, as well as Nicole Kidman's, to a lesser degree. The writer said in Back to the Future Part III (1990) that Michael J. Fox's accent as his distant relative Seamus McFly had the "most endearingly dreadful Irish accent". Sheehan recognized Julia Roberts's good-faith efforts to nail Irish accents in Michael Collins (1996) and Mary Reilly (1996), "It's not good, not by any stretch of the imagination, but it's not completely atrocious either. And at least she never lapses into full-blown caricature."

== Russian accents ==
During the silent film era in the United States, Russian-born actors like Alla Nazimova were able to perform in roles even if they had Russian accents or could not speak English. With advent of sound film, Nazimova and other actors were not able to transition to speaking performances. The Hollywood film Rasputin and the Empress (1932), a film about Imperial Russia, featured no Russian actors, and the cast did not attempt to use Russian accents. The film Crime and Punishment (1935), based on the Russian novel of the same name, did not depict any characters with Russian accents. Nicholas and Alexandra (1971) featured no significant Russian actors and no Russian accents depicted. However, actor Akim Tamiroff, despite a thick Russian accent, was highly active in American film from the 1930s to the 1970s and featured in supporting roles in films like Touch of Evil (1958). Maria Ouspenskaya, active from 1915 through 1949, was also known for her "unusual accent" and was often cast in "grandmotherly" roles.

== South African accents ==
Ronald Bergan, writing in The Guardian, said in 2010 that South African accents were "notoriously difficult" for actors to speak. Bergan said actor Marlon Brando, who attempted foreign accents, was not able to convey a South African one in A Dry White Season (1989). Bergan also called "worthy but inconsistent efforts" the performances of Denzel Washington and Kevin Kline in Cry Freedom (1987) and that of Leonardo DiCaprio in Blood Diamond (2006). Of the film Invictus (2009), Bergan said of Morgan Freeman's and Matt Damon's performances, "For most audiences... who don't have an ear especially attuned to the nuances of South African accents, Freeman and Damon will sound authentic enough."

== History of accents in the United States ==
Lawrence Christon, writing in Variety in 2007, said in U.S. film in the first half of the twentieth century, "actors spoke in a kind of neutralized Midwestern dialect," with actors like Gary Cooper and Barbara Stanwyck having distinct qualities. Actor John Wayne conveyed a similar dialect even as the Mongol ruler Genghis Khan in the film The Conqueror (1956) with little objection. French New Wave and Italian films in the 1950s and the 1960s, including The 400 Blows, Hiroshima mon amour (both 1959) and La dolce vita (1960), exposed U.S. film audiences to new accents. The Los Angeles Times commented in 2000: "Once upon a time, what characters said in a film was more important than how they said it. For years, Hollywood played fast and loose with foreign accents, generally relying on a stable of European character actors to provide international flavor, with the overall attitude being something along the lines of 'one accent fits all.'" The newspaper said many credited Meryl Streep "for raising the accent bar" with her portrayal of a Polish woman in the 1982 film Sophie's Choice. Streep subsequently performed with other accents and became the standard against which other actors' accented performances were compared. The Los Angeles Times said in 2002 that female actors, including Streep and Gwyneth Paltrow, had more success in accented performances than male actors.

== See also ==
- Queen's Latin

== Bibliography ==
- Robinson, Harlow (2007). Russians in Hollywood, Hollywood's Russians: Biography of an Image. University Press of New England. ISBN 978-1-55553-686-2.
