= The Englishman Who Went up a Hill but Came down a Mountain =

1995 film by Christopher Monger

- Theatrical release poster
- Directed by: Christopher Monger
- Written by: Ifor David Monger; Christopher Monger
- Produced by: Bob Weinstein; Harvey Weinstein; Sarah Curtis; Sally Hibbin; Robert Jones; Scott Maitland; Paul Sarony
- Starring: Hugh Grant; Tara Fitzgerald; Colm Meaney; Ian McNeice; Ian Hart; Kenneth Griffith
- Cinematography: Vernon Layton
- Edited by: David Martin
- Music by: Stephen Endelman; Gwalia Male Choir
- Production companies: Miramax Films; Parallax Pictures
- Distributed by: Miramax Films
- Release dates: 12 May 1995 (US); 4 August 1995 (UK)
- Running time: 95 minutes
- Countries: United Kingdom; United States
- Language: English
- Box office: $21 million

The Englishman Who Went up a Hill but Came down a Mountain is a 1995 romantic comedy film with a story by Ifor David Monger, written and directed by Christopher Monger. It was entered into the 19th Moscow International Film Festival and was screened in the Un Certain Regard section at the 1995 Cannes Film Festival.

The film is based on a story heard by Christopher Monger from his grandfather about the real village of Taff's Well, in the old county of Glamorgan, and its neighbouring Garth Hill. Due to 20th century urbanisation of the area, it was filmed in the more rural Llanrhaeadr-ym-Mochnant and Llansilin in Powys.

== Plot ==
In 1917, during World War I, two English cartographers, the pompous George Garrad and his junior, Reginald Anson, arrive in the fictional Welsh village of Ffynnon Garw to measure its "mountain", but everyone in town is at church, it being a Sunday. The only exception is Morgan the Goat (Note: This and some other names in the film follow a Welsh naming convention: "Welsh villages used to have so many Joneses that they would commonly distinguish them by adding an occupation to the name: Jones the Shop, Jones the Steam, Jones the Post etc." The occupation names typically take the form of a one-word shortening.) who manages the local inn and is the only redhead in the village. Most of the men of the town are away at war, and the film implies that the women are visiting the inn and have redheaded children. The cartographers reach the top and do some preliminary measurements and come up with a height of 930 feet, qualifying it as a mere hill. Anson returns and reassures them that they have more accurate measurements to make the next day.

The next day, the entire village mills around the mountain, eagerly anticipating the results. The cartographers announce that the more accurate measurements indicate a height of 984 feet, just 16 feet short of qualifying the "hill" as a mountain at 1,000 feet (305 m). The townsfolk are crestfallen and hold a town hall meeting. Morgan the Goat proposes that they raise the mountain by 20 feet, and the villagers return to the cartographers to persuade them to stay while they build a structure on the mountain, but Anson disagrees and says they have a tight schedule and they will be leaving in the morning. The Reverend Robert Jones, who, after initially opposing the scheme, grasps its symbolism in restoring the community's war-damaged self-esteem, conspires with Morgan to delay the cartographers' departure while they build an earth mound on top of the hill and make it high enough to be considered a mountain.

The next morning, everyone rallies and starts digging earth from their backyards and transporting it to the hill. On the first day, they make a mound that is approximately 14 feet high. Meanwhile, the cartographers' car is sabotaged, with the town mechanic deliberately fumbling around and breaking a part, informing them that a replacement needs to be brought in from Cardiff. When the cartographers try to catch a train from the local station, they are misinformed that the trains only carry coal. Morgan also enlists a local woman, Betty, to entertain the two Englishmen.

At this point, it starts raining and the mud on the hill begins washing off down from 14 to 10 feet. Morgan declares an emergency and asks the mechanic to remove the tarpaulin covering the broken car and take it to the mountain to cover the construction site. The rain continues all night and all day from Thursday to Sunday. Despite the religious injunction against working on a Sunday, Reverend Jones encourages the villagers to finish the work they started, viewing it as a "prayer given form". Upon Anson's suggestion, they also cover the mound with sod before the last light. During the works, Reverend Jones collapses and dies from exhaustion and old age, and the mourning villagers bury him on the mountain.

After the burial, the townspeople convince Anson to stay the night at the top of the mountain and measure it at the break of dawn because their train leaves early. Betty, who has become close to him, offers to keep him company, and they end up sharing a kiss. When Anson descends from the mountain, he informs the people that the mountain is 1,002 feet high and also announces his engagement to Betty.

Many years later, the mountain has settled down to 997 feet, thus turning back into a hill. The spirit of the Reverend buried on the mountain exhales "a hill" in a groan and all the modern-day townspeople rally with buckets of earth to raise the hill again.

== Cast ==
- Hugh Grant as Reginald Anson
- Ian McNeice as George Garrad
- Tara Fitzgerald as Elizabeth/Betty from Cardiff
- Colm Meaney as Morgan the Goat
- Ian Hart as Johnny Shellshocked
- Robert Pugh as Williams the Petroleum
- Kenneth Griffith as the Reverend Robert Jones
- Ieuan Rhys as Sgt Thomas
- Tudor Vaughan as Thomas Twp
- Hugh Vaughan as Thomas Twp too/two
- Robert Blythe as Ivor
- Garfield Morgan as Davies the School
- Lisa Palfrey as Blod Jones
- Dafydd Wyn Roberts as Tommy Twostroke
- David Lloyd Meredith as Jones the JP
- Frasier Cains as Evans the end of the world
- Jack Walters as Grandfather
- Harry Kretchmer as Young Boy
- Howell Evans as Thomas the Trains
- Maisie Evans as Girl in the classroom
- Nicholas McGaughey as Narrator (uncredited)
- Rock Salt as Villager

== Production ==
=== Writing ===
In the script there is a joke which is not obvious to non-Welsh speakers. A mechanic is asked about a nondescript broken part he has removed from a car, and replies "Well I don't know the English word, but in Welsh we call it a be'chi'ngalw." In Welsh, be'chi'ngalw is a placeholder name, like "whatchamacallit" or "thingamajig" in English. It literally means "what [do] you call?", and is a contracted form of "beth dych chi'n galw". The joke is made obvious in the novel published after the film's release.

== Release ==
The film grossed $11 million in the United States and Canada, £1.5 million in the United Kingdom and $21 million worldwide.

== Reception ==
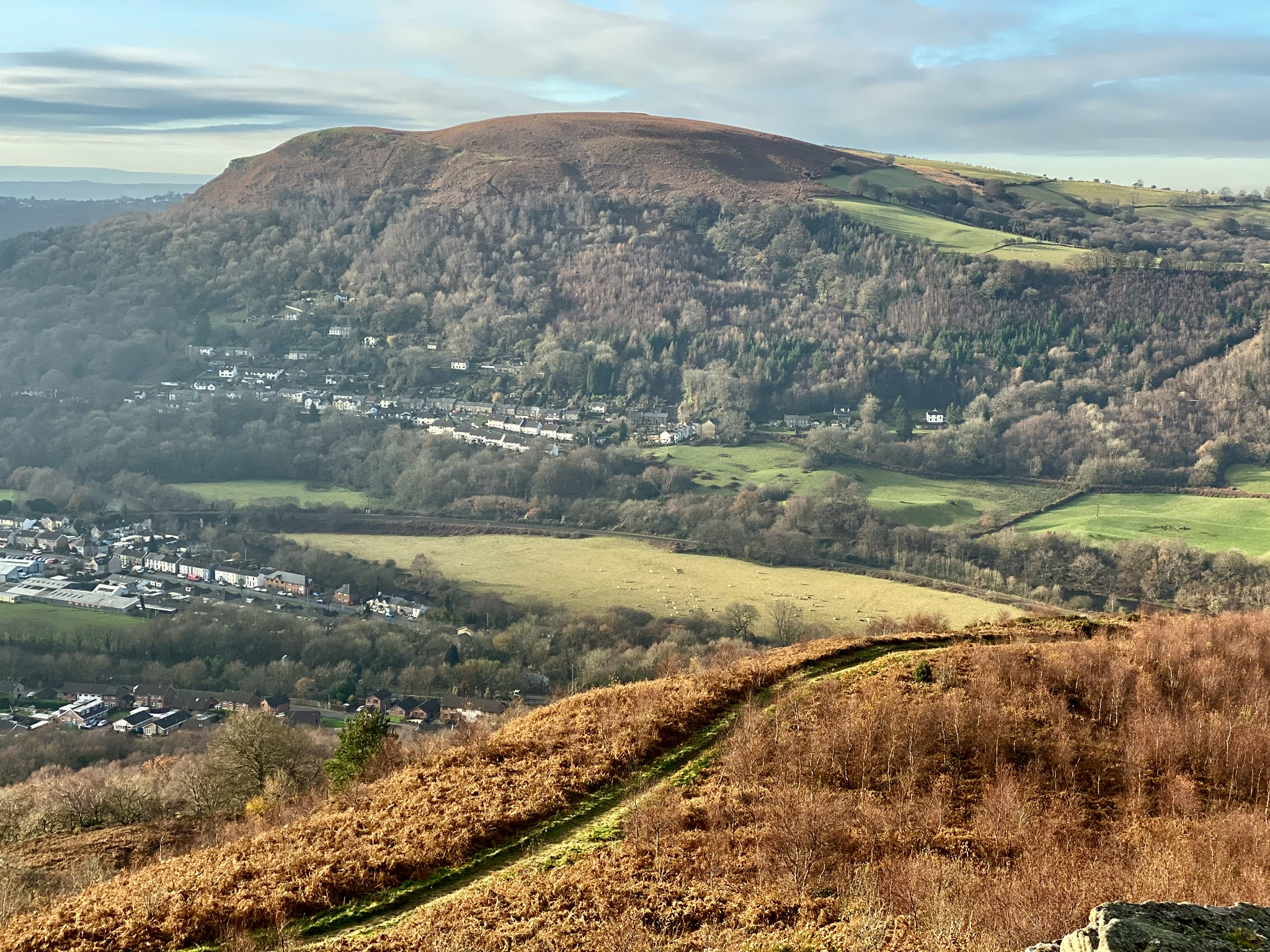
The Garth

In regard to its humorous and affectionate description of the locals, the film has often been compared with Waking Ned, a 1998 comedy film written and directed by Kirk Jones. The movie has resulted in a stream of visitors climbing to the summit of The Garth, and the Pentyrch History Society and the local community council have erected a notice on the mountain to explain its real historical significance.

On Rotten Tomatoes, the film holds a "Fresh" score of 67% with an average rating of 6.0/10, based on 33 reviews. The consensus states: "With an ample serving of Hugh Grant's trademark charm, a quirky Welsh town comes together to put their town on the map in this feel-good folksy tale."

=== Parody ===
The 2000 VeggieTales episode "King George and the Ducky" includes a skit called "The Englishman Who Went Up A Hill (And Came Down With All The Bananas)". It quickly spirals out of control with the addition of "The Swede Who Went Up A Hill (And Came Down With All The Strawberries)".

== See also ==
- English-language accents in film: Welsh
- Foel Penolau, a mountain in Wales that until 2018 had been considered a hill.
- Mynydd Graig Goch, a member of the Moel Hebog group of summits. This is a Snowdonia hill that became a mountain in September 2008 when it was measured by three Welshmen with GPS equipment and found to be 30 inches (76 cm) taller than was thought, thereby exceeding the height required to classify it as a 2,000-foot (610 m) mountain by 6 inches (15 cm).
- Mount Massive in Colorado - Contention arose over whether Massive or its neighbour, Mount Elbert, which have a height difference of only 12 feet (3.7 m), was the highest Rocky mountain and second highest mountain in the contiguous United States, after Mount Whitney. This led to a dispute which came to a head with the Mount Massive supporters building large piles of stones on the summit to boost its height, only to have the Mount Elbert proponents demolish them.
