= Morganstown =

District of Cardiff, Wales

Coordinates: 51.528°N 3.264°W

Morganstown: Welsh: Pentre-poeth / Treforgan
- Location within Cardiff
- OS grid reference: ST1281
- Community: Radyr and Morganstown
- Principal area: Cardiff
- Preserved county: Cardiff
- Country: Wales
- Sovereign state: United Kingdom
- Post town: Cardiff
- Postcode district: CF15
- Dialling code: 029
- Police: South Wales
- Fire: South Wales
- Ambulance: Welsh
- UK Parliament: Cardiff West
- Senedd Cymru – Welsh Parliament: Cardiff West
- Website: Radyr and Morganstown Community Association

Morganstown (Welsh: Pentre-poeth or Treforgan) is a part of the community of Radyr and Morganstown in the north of Cardiff, just over 5 miles (8 km) northwest of Cardiff city centre and separated from Radyr to the south by the M4 motorway. It elects four councillors to the Radyr and Morganstown community council.

== Early history ==
The earliest building that has been discovered in Morganstown is the Morganstown Castle Mound from the Middle Ages.

Historically part of the parish of Radyr, the modern settlement of Morganstown has its origins in the late eighteenth century. At that time a small number of cottages were built on the land of Morgan William or Williams (c.1765–1852) of Tynyberllan farm. These were listed under the heading of 'Tynyberllan' in the 1801 census.

The Radyr tithe map of the early 1840s shows the existence of several cottages on the west side of what is now Tŷ Nant Road, on land belonging to Morgan William(s). The censuses of 1841 and 1851 list these dwellings under the name of Tynyberllan. Most of the families relied for their living on one of the industries of the lower Taff Valley, with many of the men being employed as colliers, iron miners, puddlers, firemen, and coke burners.

Many of the families that appear in the census also appear in the Radyr parish records. Records of baptisms and burials from 1840s to the 1870s do not refer to the settlement as Tynyberllan, however, but as Pentre (earliest reference 1845) and then Pentre-poeth (earliest reference 1850).

== Bethel Calvinistic Methodist Chapel ==
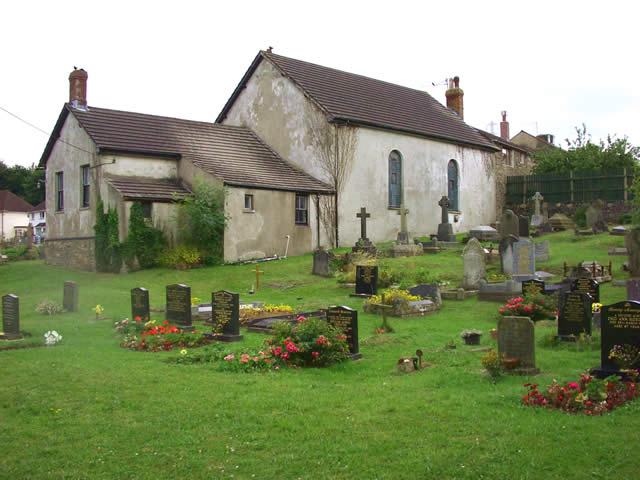
Bethel Chapel

There are records of a Calvinistic Methodist congregation in the vicinity dating back to 1817. The current building (now closed) dates from 1842, as shown by a plaque on an exterior wall (‘BETHEL. Erected by the CALV. METHODISTS A.D. 1842’). Despite the English inscription this was a Welsh-language cause: the area was overwhelmingly Welsh-speaking at the time. The chapel was built on land owned by Morgan William(s).

Morgan William(s) himself was buried in the graveyard in 1852. His bilingual gravestone (under the name ‘Morgan William’) has survived to this day. Also buried there are two victims of the 1875 disaster at the Lan colliery (Gwaelod-y-garth), including the 13 year-old Moses Llewelyn, who worked as a door-boy at the mine.

The Welsh-language services at Bethel came to an end about 1928.

== The emergence of the name Morganstown ==
The first known example of the name ‘Morgan’s Town’ dates from 1859. The 1861 census describes the settlement as ‘Morganstown’ (with one instance of the Welsh equivalent 'Treforgan'). The parish baptismal records continue to use ‘Pentre-poeth’ until the later 1870s. A record from 1878 refers to ‘Morganstown (otherwise Pentrepoeth)’; from then on the name Morganstown predominates. Morganstown presumably commemorates Morgan William(s), on whose land the settlement and its chapel were built.

== Welsh names ==
Morganstown is noted for having two Welsh names, Pentre-poeth and Treforgan, both recorded from the middle of nineteenth century. Cardiff Council uses Pentre-poeth as the official form. But currently (2017) both names appear on different roadsigns in the vicinity. The earlier name of Tynyberllan (literally ‘orchard homestead’ and formerly used in both English and Welsh) has not been used to refer to Morganstown since the middle of nineteenth century.

Treforgan (in meaning the exact equivalent of Morganstown) is first recorded in 1855, a few years earlier than its English equivalent. Neither can be shown to pre-date the death of Morgan William(s) in 1852. The use of Treforgan appears to have been particularly associated with Bethel chapel in Welsh-language sources, built as it was on land given by Morgan William(s) and later the location of his grave. As noted above, the chapel's Welsh-language services came to an end about 1928. It may be significant that Evan Jones, who was appointed curate of Radyr in 1853, called the settlement 'Pentrepoeth' in memoirs published in 1897 (he was of course an Anglican rather than a Methodist).

Pentre-poeth is recorded before both Morganstown and Treforgan, and is commonly found in the Radyr parish records (which were kept in English). The name Pentre-poeth is known from several areas where Welsh is or was commonly spoken, including Bassaleg, Gelligaer, Llangyfelach, Machen, Oswestry, Pwllheli, and Tywyn. The Welsh noun pentre refers to a small settlement without a church and in place names the adjective poeth generally refers to an area of land that has been cleared by fire. So Pentre-poeth probably means ‘settlement cleared by burning’. The example of Pentre-poeth from Pwllheli has been translated as 'a burnt area near the boundary of a township' (Morganstown is at some distance from the parish church of Radyr, now in Danescourt).

In official English-language records, Morganstown had largely replaced Pentre-poeth by the end of the 1870s. Pentre-poeth continued to be used in Welsh, however. An article by the Rev. Edward Matthews (1813–1892), then living at Canton near Cardiff, in the Calvinistic Methodist magazine Y Cylchgrawn (1874), suggests that some of the residents were annoyed at the continuing use of Pentre-poeth and considered Treforgan to be a more suitable name. It may be that the possible interpretation of Pentre-poeth as 'hot village' was in part responsible for a desire to replace it with the new name of Treforgan.

Nevertheless, Pentre-poeth continued to be used in Welsh. The Dictionary of the Place-names of Wales states that 'Pentre-poeth was the dominant form among W[elsh]-speakers down to the late 19th century'. The Welsh language declined markedly in the area in the latter part of the nineteenth century and the early part of the twentieth century. Nevertheless, it appears that Pentre-poeth remained the name favoured by local Welsh speakers. In a study of the native Welsh dialect of the lower Taff valley, Ceinwen Thomas (1911–2008) of Nantgarw records Pentre-poeth as the local Welsh name of Morganstown and makes no reference to the use of Treforgan.

In a Welsh-language memoir about his up-bringing in Radyr (alongside his brother Rhodri), Professor Prys Morgan (b. 1937) refers to Morganstown as Pentre-poeth.

Although Pentre-poeth is the official form used by Cardiff Council, the local community council uses Treforgan.
