= Morganstown Castle Mound =

Morganstown Castle Mound Morganstown Motte
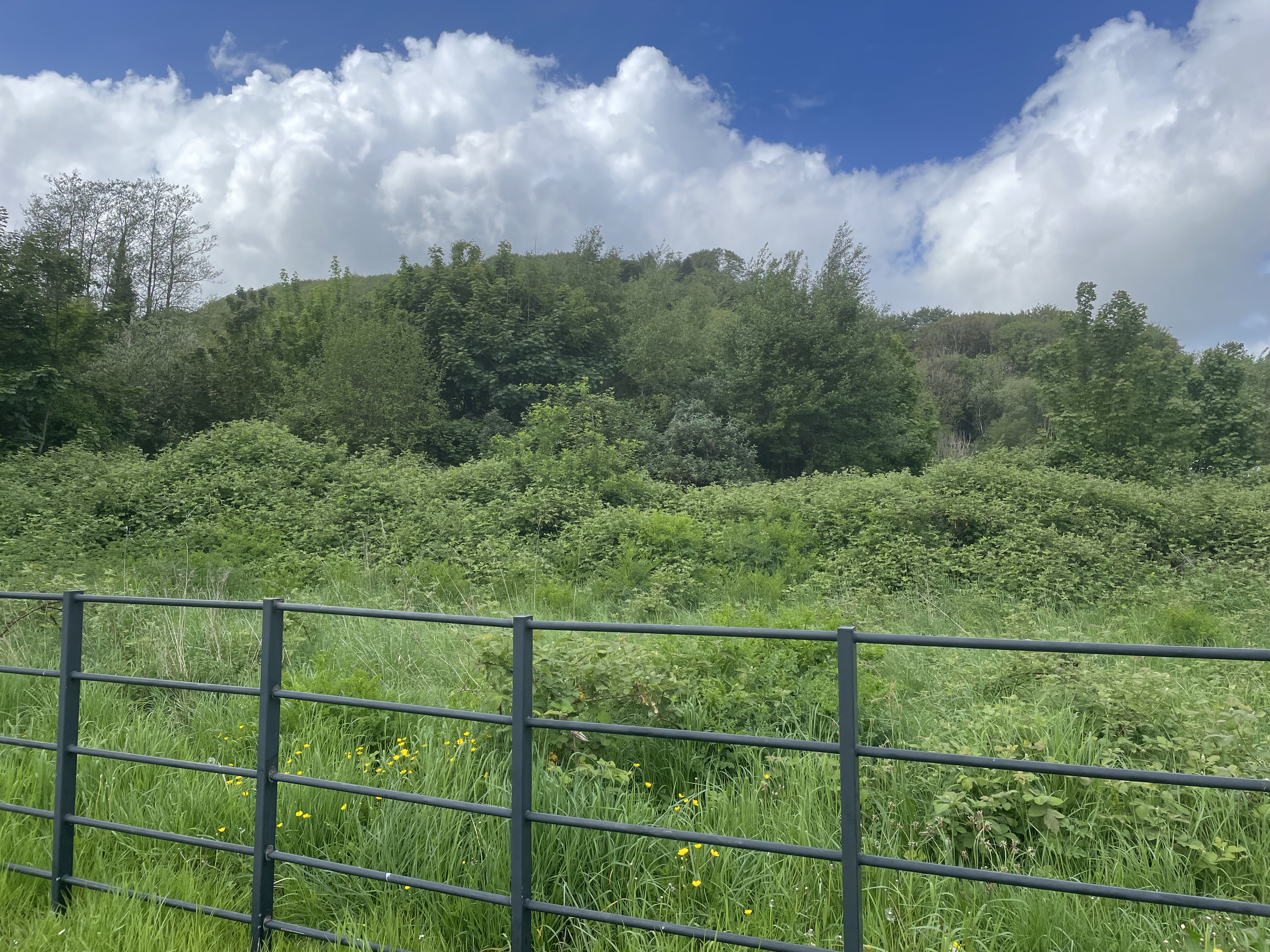
- The overgrown Morganstown Castle Mound

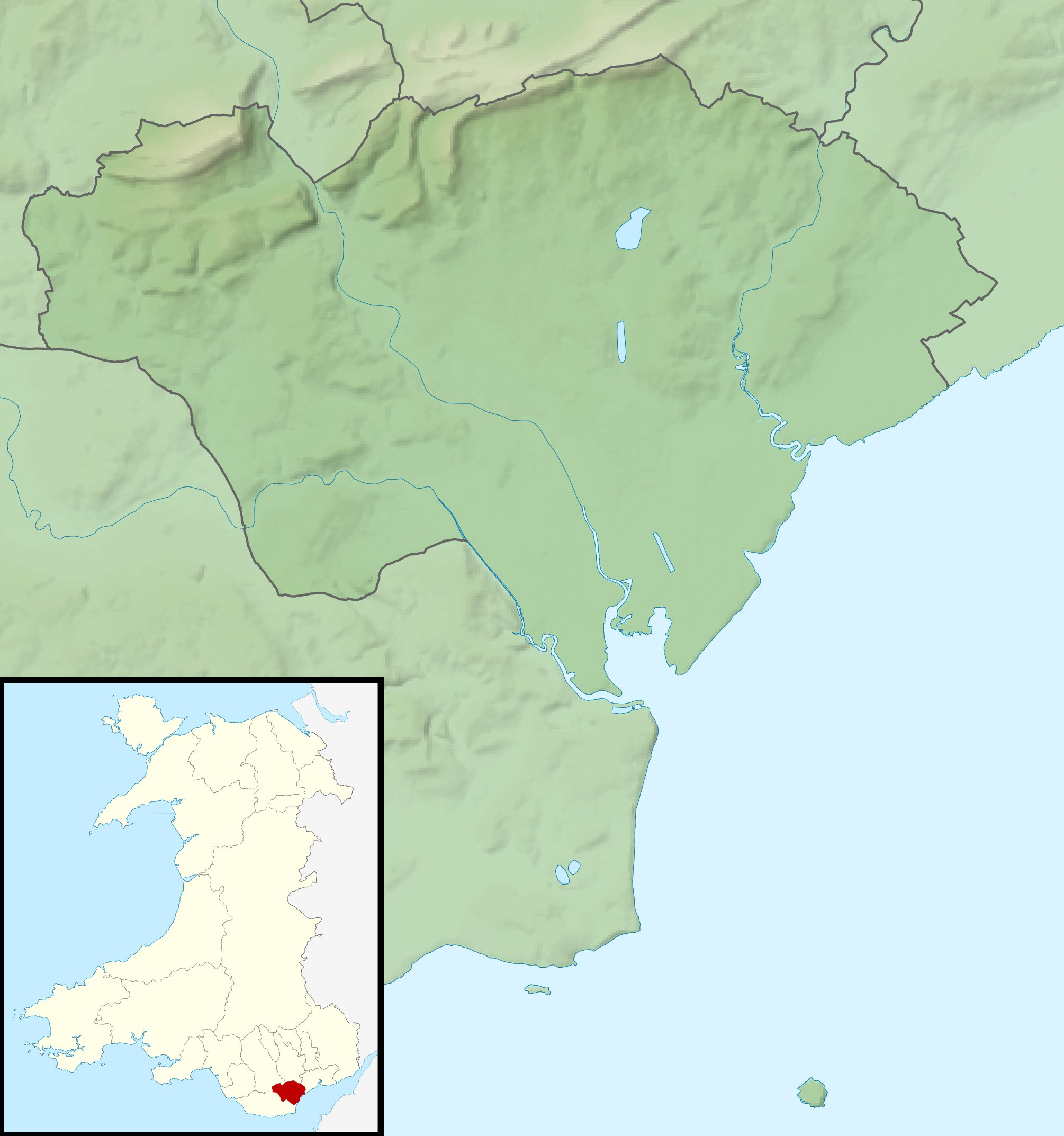
- Location in Cardiff
- 51.528960°N 3.258213°W
- Type: Motte-and-bailey castle
- Location: Morganstown, Cardiff, Wales

Scheduled monument
- Official name: Morganstown Castle Mound
- Designated: 29 May 1958; 68 years ago
- Reference no.: GM256

Morganstown Castle Mound, also known as Morganstown Motte, is a medieval motte in the community of Morganstown in Cardiff, Wales, which is a scheduled monument.

== History ==
Motte-and-bailey castles date back to the medieval period, from 1066 to 1540 AD. Recently a broken piece of French polychrome pottery ware was found on the site. There is no record of the motte as to its exact age, although as with other mottes in the north of Cardiff, such as Treoda Castle Mound and Twmpath Castle, it is believed that it was established between the late 11th century and early 12th century.

== Present day ==
The motte is a large mound of soil and/or stone and stands from 4 meters (13 ft) high with steep sides and a flat top from 14 meters (46 ft) in diameter and a base of 30 meters (98 ft) diameter. The tower on the motte would have been constructed out of either timber or stone. The motte is surrounded by a ditch which was either a wet or dry ditch and 6 meters (20 ft) wide with an outer bank from 1 meter (3.3 ft) high and 2.5 meters (8.2 ft) wide. The site is now overgrown with trees and shrubs.

Cadw has described the monument as being "of national importance for its potential to enhance our knowledge of medieval defensive practices. The monument is well-preserved and an important relic of the medieval landscape. It retains significant archaeological potential, with a strong probability of the presence of both structural evidence and intact associated deposits. The scheduled area comprises the remains described and areas around them within which related evidence may be expected to survive."

== See also ==
- List of castles in Wales
- Castles in Great Britain and Ireland
- List of scheduled monuments in Cardiff
- List of motte-and-bailey castles
