= Caer Castell Camp =

Caer Castell Camp Caer Castell Ring Motte
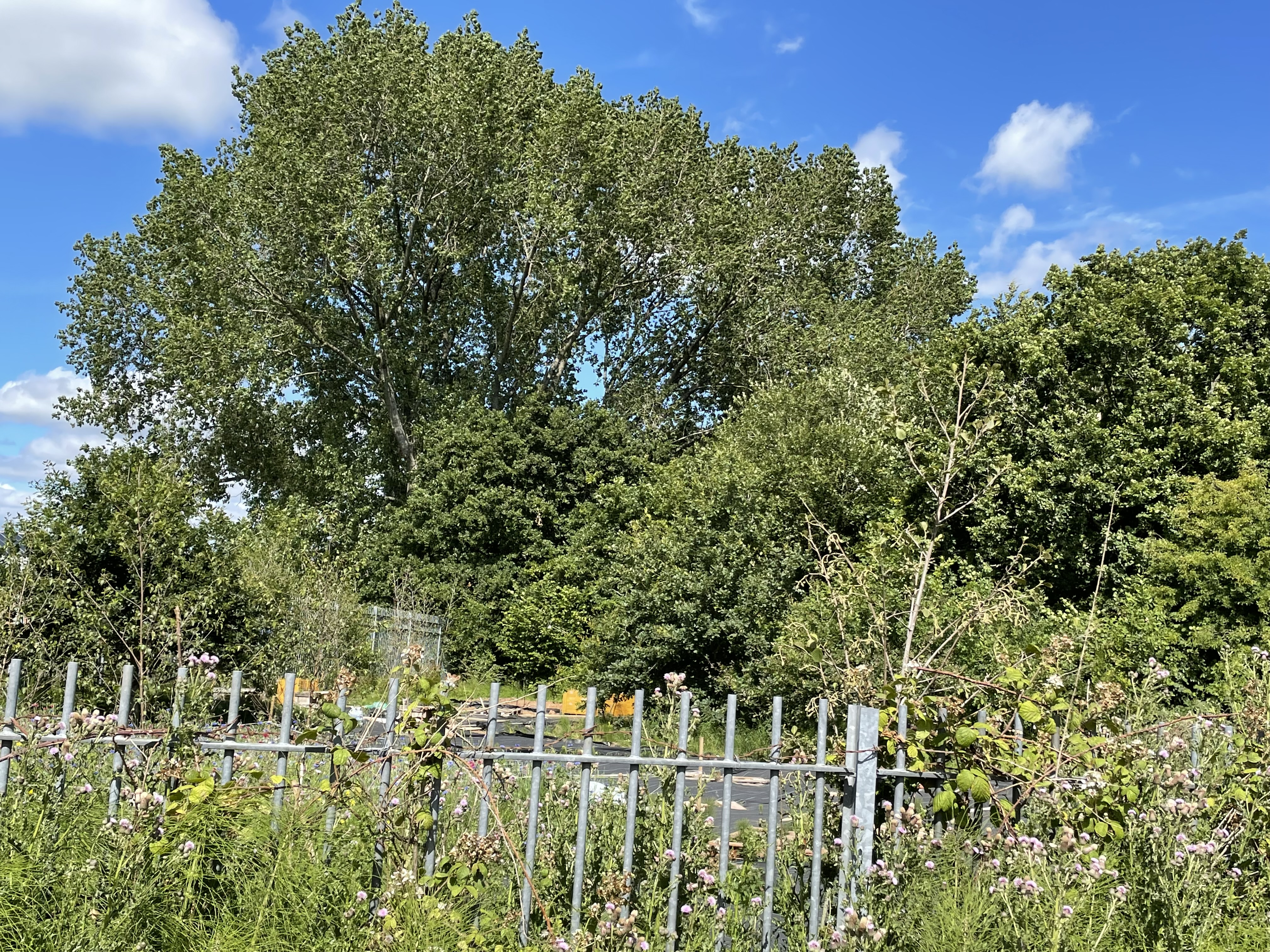
- The overgrown Caer Castell Camp

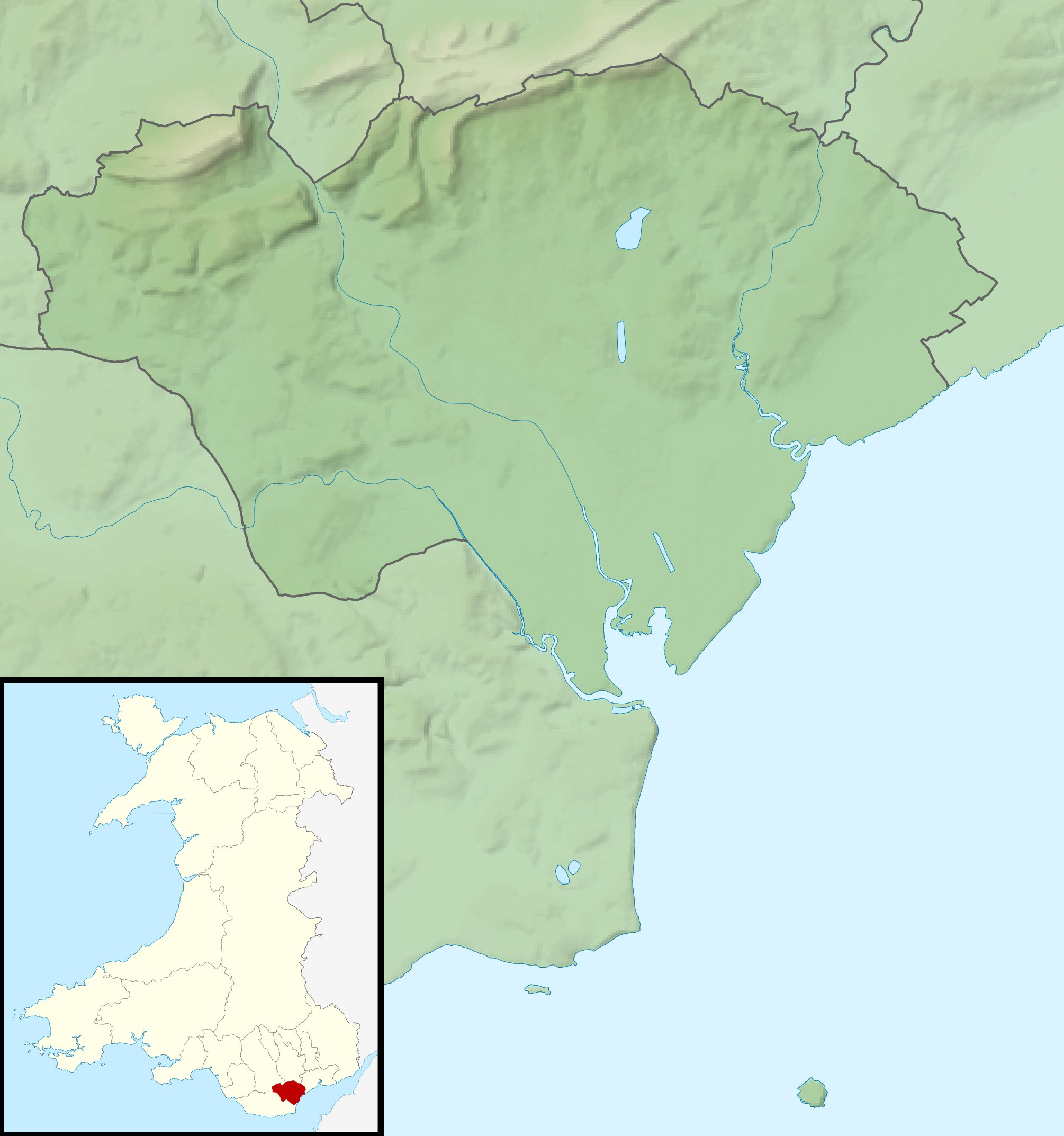
- Location in Cardiff
- 51.51654°N 3.11557°W
- Type: Motte and ditch
- Location: Rumney, Cardiff, Wales

Scheduled monument
- Official name: Caer Castell Camp
- Reference no.: GM216

Caer Castell Camp, also known as Caer Castell Ring Motte, is a medieval motte and ditch in Rumney in Cardiff, Wales, which is a scheduled monument.

== History ==
Motte-and-bailey castles date back to the medieval period, from 1066 to 1540 AD. As such, the motte is of national importance, which may improve our understanding of medieval defensive structures.

== Present day ==
Caer Castell Camp is today located within the grounds of St Illtyd's Catholic High School. The structure is about 45 meters (148 ft) in diameter at its base, at its top about 33 meters (108 ft) in diameter and about 9 meters (30 ft) high. Some landscaping has been carried out but the site is overgrown with trees, shrubs and brambles.

== See also ==
- List of castles in Wales
- Castles in Great Britain and Ireland
- List of scheduled monuments in Cardiff
- List of motte-and-bailey castles
