= Twmpath Castle =

Twmpath Castle Twmpath Motte
- Caer Cynwrig (Welsh)
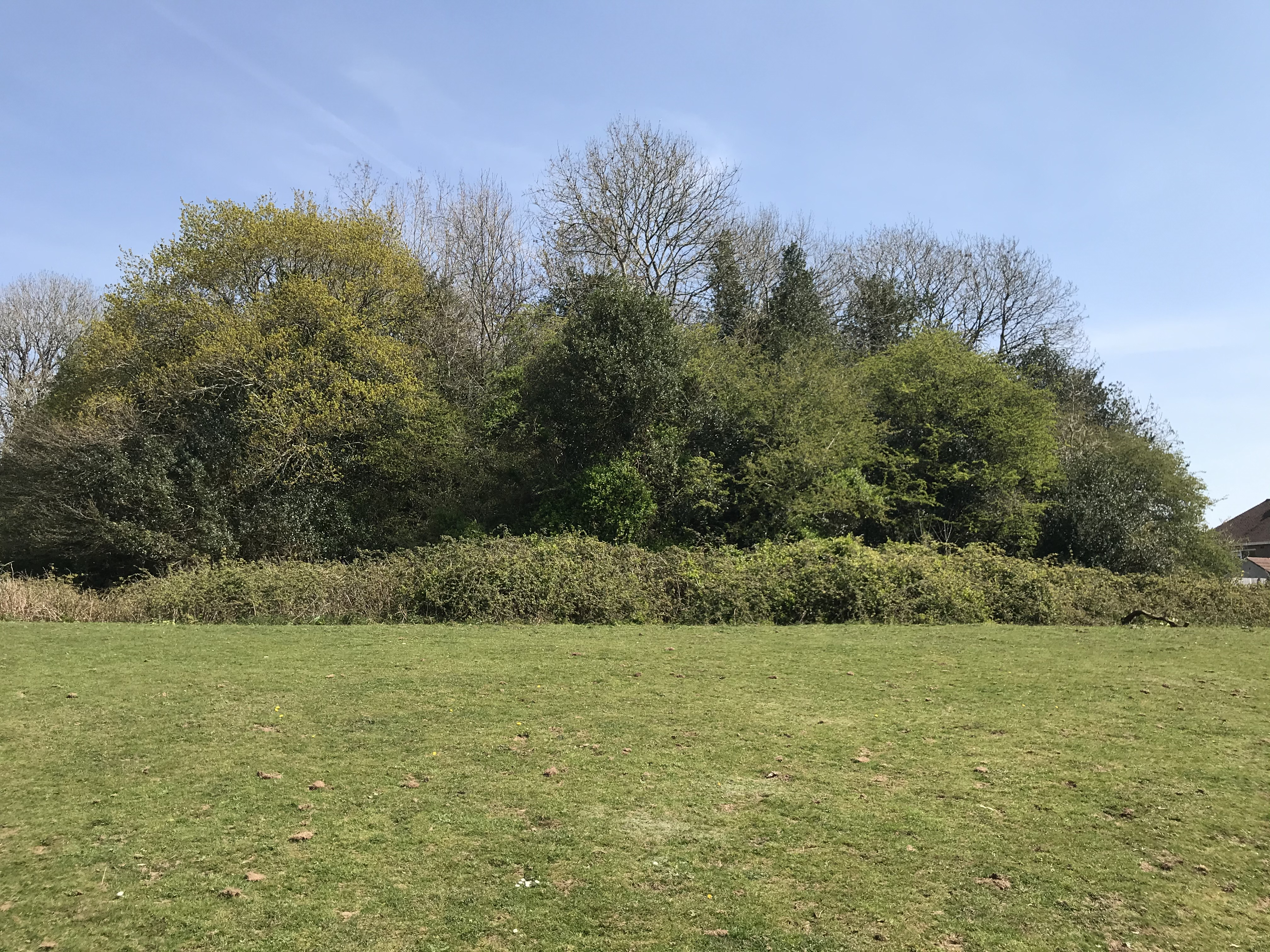
- Twmpath Castle

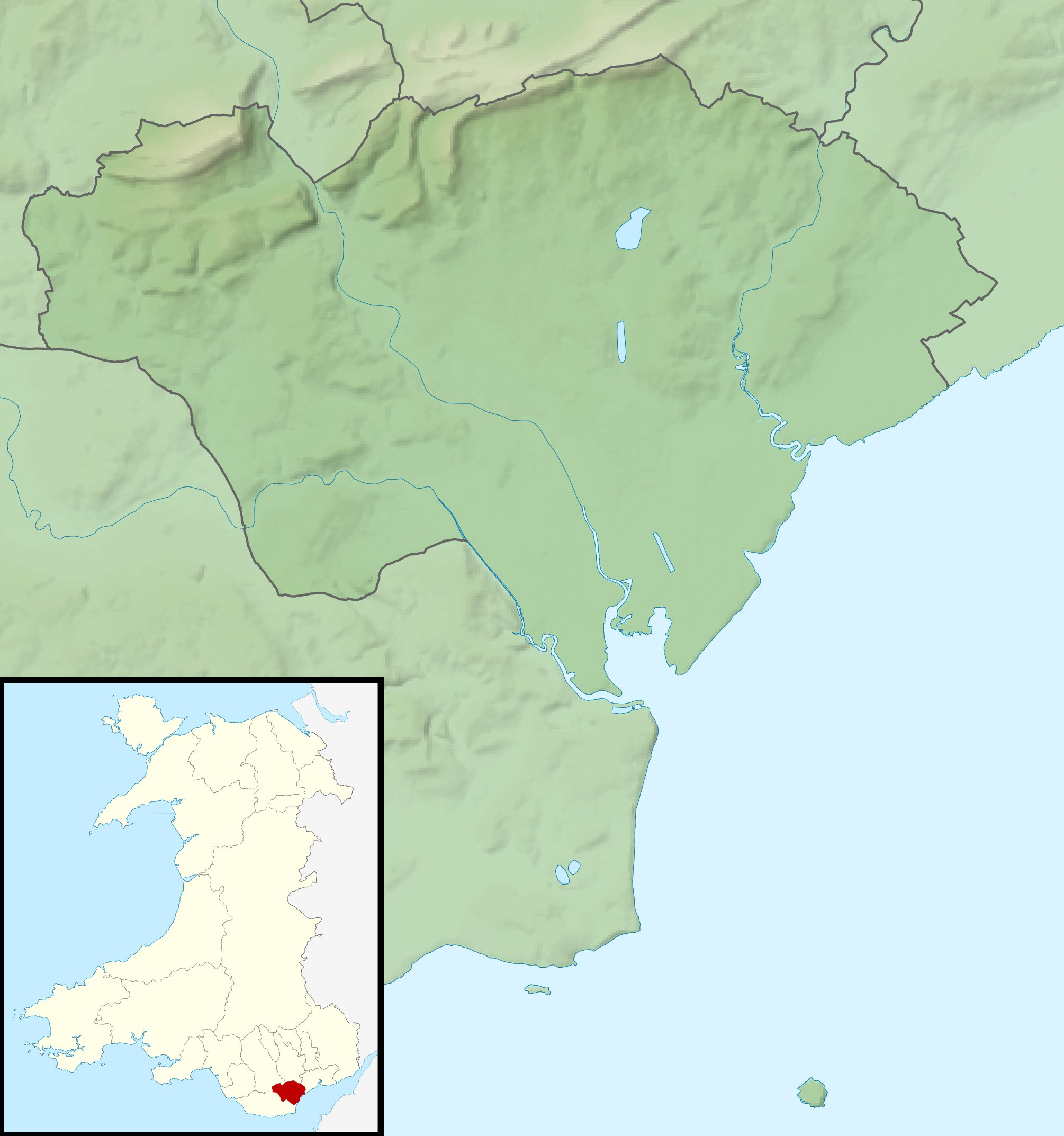
- Location in Cardiff
- 51.532355°N 3.221363°W
- Type: Motte-and-bailey castle
- Location: Rhiwbina, Cardiff, Wales

Scheduled monument
- Official name: Twmpath, Rhiwbina
- Designated: 23 July 1930; 95 years ago
- Reference no.: GM017

Twmpath Castle, also known as Twmpath Motte (Welsh: Caer Cynwrig), is a medieval motte on the southern slope of Wenallt Hill near Rhiwbina in Cardiff, Wales, which is a scheduled monument.

== Toponymy ==
Twmpath is a Welsh word literally meaning a hump. Caer Cynwrig are both Welsh words. Caer (Old Welsh: cair or kair) is a placename element meaning a fortification, a camp, an inclosure, a wall or mound of defence, while Cynwrig in Old Welsh means high hill.

== History ==
The motte-and-bailey castle dates back to the middle Ages from about 1066 to 1540. Originally Twmpath Castle was a Welsh camp called Caer Cynwrig, which was captured and occupied by the Normans and became the third largest motte in the Lordship of Glamorgan. Robert Fitzhamon founded Cardiff Castle and used the old Cardiff Roman Fort to construct it. Cardiff Castle was the capital of the Lordship of Glamorgan and Twmpath Castle formed one of a string of fortifications used to defend the newly conquered town of Cardiff with a ring of eight smaller earth and timber castles, Caerau Hillfort, Morganstown Castle Mound, Castell Coch and Whitchurch (known as Treoda), Cae’r Castell, near St Mellons and Rumney Castle.

== Present day ==
Today the site is overgrown and stands approximately 25 ft (7.6 m) high and 130 ft (40 m) around. The top is 16 m (52 ft) in diameter. The motte is surrounded by a ditch, which varies in depth between 1 m (3.3 ft) to 1.2 m (3.9 ft) and width between 4 m (13 ft) and 5 m (16 ft).

Cadw has described the monument as being of "National importance for its potential to enhance our knowledge of medieval defensive practices. The monument is well-preserved and an important relic of the medieval landscape. It retains significant archaeological potential, with a strong probability of the presence of both structural evidence and intact associated deposits." It was designated as a scheduled monument on 23 July 1930.

== Legends ==
Legend has it that it is a burial mound erected about 1089 for Iestyn ap Gwrgan, Lord of Glamorgan. The other legend says that the Devil piled up some earth in the form of a mound.

== See also ==
- List of castles in Wales
- Castles in Great Britain and Ireland
- List of scheduled monuments in Cardiff
