= Girl from Rio (2001 film) =

2001 film by Christopher Monger

Chica de Río
- English-language poster of Chica de Río
- Directed by: Christopher Monger
- Written by: Christopher Monger; Julian Ibañez; Francisco Lara
- Produced by: Muir Sutherland; Andrés Vicente Gómez
- Starring: Hugh Laurie; Vanessa Nunes; Santiago Segura; Patrick Barlow
- Cinematography: José Luis Alcaine
- Edited by: Nicholas Wentworth
- Distributed by: United Kingdom: Redbus Film Distribution; Spain: Lolafilms
- Release date: 13 July 2001 (Spain)
- Running time: 102 min.
- Countries: Brazil; United Kingdom
- Language: English

Girl from Rio (Spanish:Chica de Río) is a 2001 film, written and directed by Christopher Monger, starring Hugh Laurie, Vanessa Nunes, Santiago Segura, Lia Williams, and Patrick Barlow.

== Plot ==
Raymond Woods, a junior manager in a bank in the City, is becoming increasingly bored of his life as it takes a downhill tumble. First he finds out that he has missed the promotion opportunity at work by his bad tempered and disapproving boss, Strothers, and then he catches his wife a couple of days before Christmas having an affair with Strothers.

(MISSING:) There is a plot detail left out here. Hugh Laurie character decides to get back at his bank boss by stealing money from the bank and get back at his wife by leaving her and living the high life in Rio. His character loves to watch latin dancing, hence another reason to go to Rio, where the dancer Orlinda is.

Touching down in Rio, he calls a cab to take him to a nice hotel. The cab driver, Paulo, takes him to a fairly run down hotel. Raymond insists he needs a much nicer hotel with a beach, while Paulo insists Raymond would not be able to afford such a hotel, but suddenly changes heart once Raymond shows him a large wad of cash. Paulo immediately befriends Raymond, with his eyes greedily on his cash as he owes money to the biggest Mafia leader in Rio. He insists that he is prepared to take Raymond wherever he needs to go and whatever he needs done can be done. Therefore, Paulo takes Raymond to the nicest hotel in Rio. Raymond trips up in a commotion at the door of the hotel, dropping his bag and spreading his cash all over the floor. Once he hastily shuffles it all away, the hotel clerks immediately show him to the Presidential suite. After a day of shopping and generous spending Raymond reveals to Paulo he has come to Rio to look for the famous samba dancer Orlinda.

Paulo then calls to tell Raymond he has found Orlinda. After dropping Raymond off at the club where Orlinda is performing, Paulo sneaks back to the hotel in an unsuccessful attempt to steal the money. Meanwhile, Raymond and Orlinda dance together, then Paulo drives them back to the hotel. Paulo tells Orlinda about the safe. Raymond enjoys a passionate night with Orlinda, but wakes to find the money gone. Raymond tries to find Orlinda, believing she has been kidnapped along with the money. Realising it is Christmas Eve, Paulo helps Raymond find Orlinda at midnight mass. She confesses to stealing his money, but tells him she doesn't have it, as she owed money to a Mafia leader, Bichero. On leaving mass, Raymond sees Bichero handing out cash, and runs after Bichero's car, but is captured. Bichero is about to have him executed, but instead locks him in a safe and forces him to count Bichero's money.

On Christmas Day, Orlinda visits Raymond to give him a present. Raymond is still angry at the fact that she has ended him up in this situation. She tells him that she wished the money was only a small portion of what he owned and it wouldn't matter that she took it, and tells Raymond he's a "common crook". She tells Raymond not to give up hope. Raymond collects a large portion of the money and claims it is his. Orlinda then meets up with Paulo who takes his taxi and ties a rope to pull away at the bars of Raymond's prison.

Raymond decides he should return the money to the bank, as he still has enough time to get back to England and return the money to the vaults without anybody noticing it had gone. He quickly buys a ticket back to London and hires a taxi driver to rush him back to the bank. However, when he arrives, the police are all over the building. About to rush in and explain to the police inspector, he discovers that over the Christmas period, somebody tunnelled into the vault and swiped the remainder of the money. Confused and relieved, Raymond leaves the bank, intending to return to Rio. Catching a taxi, when a couple leave, he recognises them as his wife and Strothers who have evidently just returned from their holiday in Tenerife. He tells his wife he'll leave her the address of where he's living in Rio to send the divorce papers, resigns from his job and goes back to Rio. He is next shown living with Orlinda and Paulo some years later with two babies and Bichero as his servant.

== Soundtrack ==
- The soundtrack is Silencio, by Adriana Maciel.
- The end credits is a song called "Libera Geral" by Terra Samba.
