= Gwaelod-y-Garth =

Village in Cardiff, Wales

Coordinates: 51.5472°N 3.2766°W

Gwaelod-y-garth
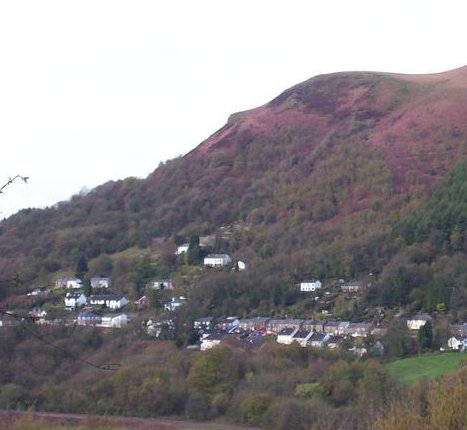

- Location within Cardiff
- OS grid reference: ST214824
- Principal area: Cardiff
- Preserved county: South Glamorgan
- Country: Wales
- Sovereign state: United Kingdom
- Post town: CARDIFF
- Postcode district: CF15
- Dialling code: 029
- Police: South Wales
- Fire: South Wales
- Ambulance: Welsh
- UK Parliament: Cardiff West
- Senedd Cymru – Welsh Parliament: Cardiff West

Gwaelod-y-Garth (Welsh for 'foot of the Garth'; Welsh pronunciation: [ˌɡwei̯lɔd ə ˈgarθ]) is a village in the community of Pentyrch, Cardiff in Wales.

== Location ==
Gwaelod-y-garth is located at the foot of Garth Hill and separated from the neighbouring village of Taffs Well by the River Taff, approximately six miles (10 km) north-west of central Cardiff and five miles (8 km) south-east of Pontypridd. The castle of Castell Coch is within reach of the village, by car or on foot.

== History ==
In Elizabethan times, Gwaelod-y-Garth was noted for its iron-ore mines. The mines were opened between 1565 and 1625, and re-opened in the 19th century by the Blackmoor Booker company. In the early 1990s, a campaign was held to save the site.

The Pentyrch Iron Works was opened in Gwaelod-y-Garth in 1740 (Gwaelod-y-Garth was then in the parish of Pentyrch). It supplied iron to the Melingriffith Tin Plate Works in Whitchurch, about 3 miles (4.8 km) downriver. In 1812 a tramway was constructed to the Mellingriffith Works; in 1871 this was upgraded to the standard-gauge Melingriffith and Pentyrch Railway. An Ordnance Survey map revised in 1915 shows the works as 'disused'. The forge from the ironworks was demolished in 1977 and the site is now used for housing.

Following the sound of a loud explosion from the nearby quarry, on 30 July 2026 the village was flooded by up to 5 feet of muddy water. No explanation of the cause was initially forthcoming.

== Amenities ==
Amenities include a Royal Mail collection point, Garth Tyres yard and a police car park, from where South Wales Police Roads Policing Unit is run. There is also a large playing field named Heol Berry, where local amateur football team Gwaelod Rangers plays. At the top end of the village is the village pub, the Gwaelod Y Garth Inn. Situated in the village is Gwaelod-y-Garth Primary School, a school that educates through both the medium of Welsh and English. The students are separated into two sections of the school (English and Welsh). The village has a Welsh medium chapel called Bethlehem built in 1832.

== Notable residents ==
- Dr. Mary Gillham, naturalist, one of the first women to visit Antarctica, in 1959.
- Norma Procter (environmentalist) MBE - a British environmental campaigner, local historian, novelist, poet, and painter associated with environmental activism and heritage preservation in South Wales. Her historical novel "The House of Abraham Phillips" was written on discovering in her cottage deeds that Abraham Phillips, the overman killed at the Lan mining disaster in 1875 and accused of negligence, had lived in the cottage where she now lives. She also wrote a history of the local pub, The Gwaelod-y-Garth. In 2011 Procter was awarded an MBE for her services to the environment, including running a successful 20-year-long campaign against proposals to extend a quarry that would have inflicted damage to an ancient woodland and important industrial heritage.

== See also ==
- Garth Mountain
