= Radyr and Morganstown =

Community in Cardiff, Wales

- Community
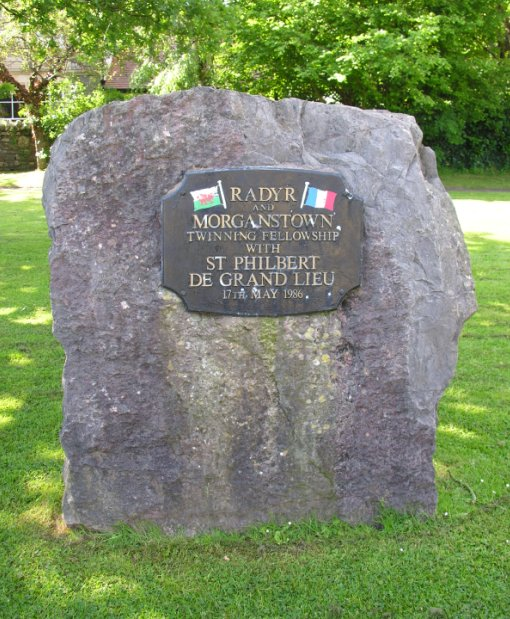
- Radyr & Morganstown Twinning Fellowship monument
- Population: 6,417 (2011 census)
- Principal area: Cardiff
- Country: Wales
- Sovereign state: United Kingdom
- Post town: CARDIFF
- Postcode district: CF15
- Dialling code: +44-29
- UK Parliament: Cardiff West
- Senedd Cymru – Welsh Parliament: Cardiff West
- Councillors: 1
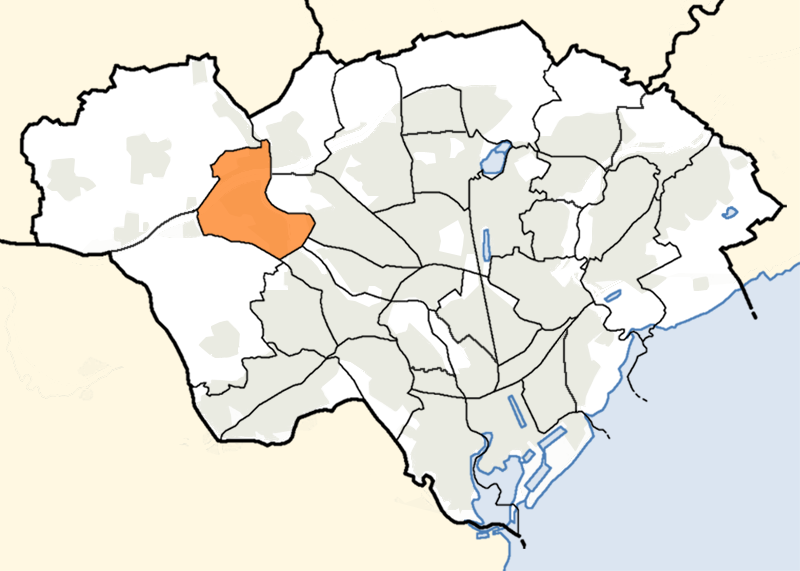
- List of places UK Wales Cardiff Map of the community

Radyr and Morganstown is a community (civil parish) of Cardiff which covers the areas of Radyr and Morganstown in the northwest of Cardiff, capital city of Wales. The community elects a Radyr and Morganstown community council.

== Description ==
The Radyr and Morganstown community is crossed to the north by the M4 motorway, which separates Morganstown from Radyr. The eastern border of the community and ward is defined by the River Taff. The rural communities of Pentyrch and St Fagans lie to the northwest and southwest. It is one of the most affluent areas of Cardiff, with Radyr being more so than Morganstown.

Pentyrch		Tongwynlais
	Radyr & Morganstown	Whitchurch
St Fagans	Fairwater	Llandaff North/ Llandaff

The boundary of the Radyr and Morganstown community matches that of the electoral ward. According to the 2011 census the population of the ward was 6,417.

It is located in the parliamentary constituency of Cardiff West and the Senedd constituency of the same name.

== Twin town ==
Since 1986 Radyr and Morganstown has been twinned with Saint-Philbert-de-Grand-Lieu, a town south-west of Nantes (Cardiff's twin city) on the southern shores of the Lac de Grand Lieu in Loire-Atlantique, France. The first exchange visit took place in May 1986 and Twinning Charters were signed by chairmen of both community councils. On the 10th anniversary of the twinning fellowship, Radyr presented the people of St Philbert with a red telephone box.

The next year the French presented the Radyr community with a wine press, now sited in the gardens of the Old Church Rooms. The 20th anniversary was celebrated with a reception at the Old Church Rooms in 2006. The twinning committee is one of the more active in the area and cultural exchanges between the two communities take place annually. Since 2009 a regular Twinning Weekend has taken place, beginning in May 2009 with 49 Radyr residents travelling to St Philbert. The twinning committee also arranges Boules tournaments and social events throughout the summer.

== Community Council ==
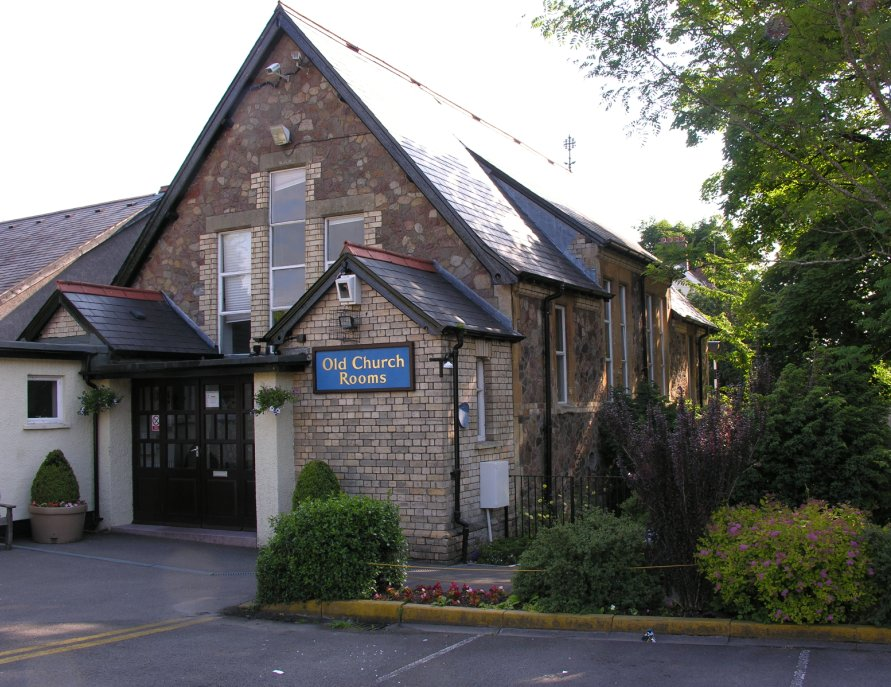
The Old Church Rooms, Radyr, where Community Council committee meetings are held

Radyr and Morganstown is one of six communities in Cardiff to elect a Community Council. The council has a clerk and twelve councillors, with the councillors being elected, four each, from the community wards of Morganstown, Radyr North and Radyr South.

Elections take place every five years.

=== 2017 Community Council Election ===
All candidates who stood for election were elected unopposed. The remaining five seats were filled through co-option by members of the community council.

The following by-elections took place between May 2017 and the next election in 2022.

Morganstown Ward - Thursday, 6 February 2020
Party	Candidate	Votes	%	±%
Independent	Allan Cook	250		
Independent	Michelle Lenton-Johnson	96		
Turnout		346	18.4	

=== 2022 Community Council Election ===
The next election is due in May 2022 on the same day as the Cardiff Council elections.

== County councillors ==
The coterminous Radyr ward elects one county councillor to the City of Cardiff Council. Between 1999 and 2008 the ward was represented by Labour Party councillor, Marion Drake. At the 2008 council elections the ward was won by Rod McKerlich for the Conservative Party, with 60% of the vote.
