= Garth Hill =

Hill (307m) in Cardiff, Wales

The Garth
- Mynydd y Garth (Welsh)
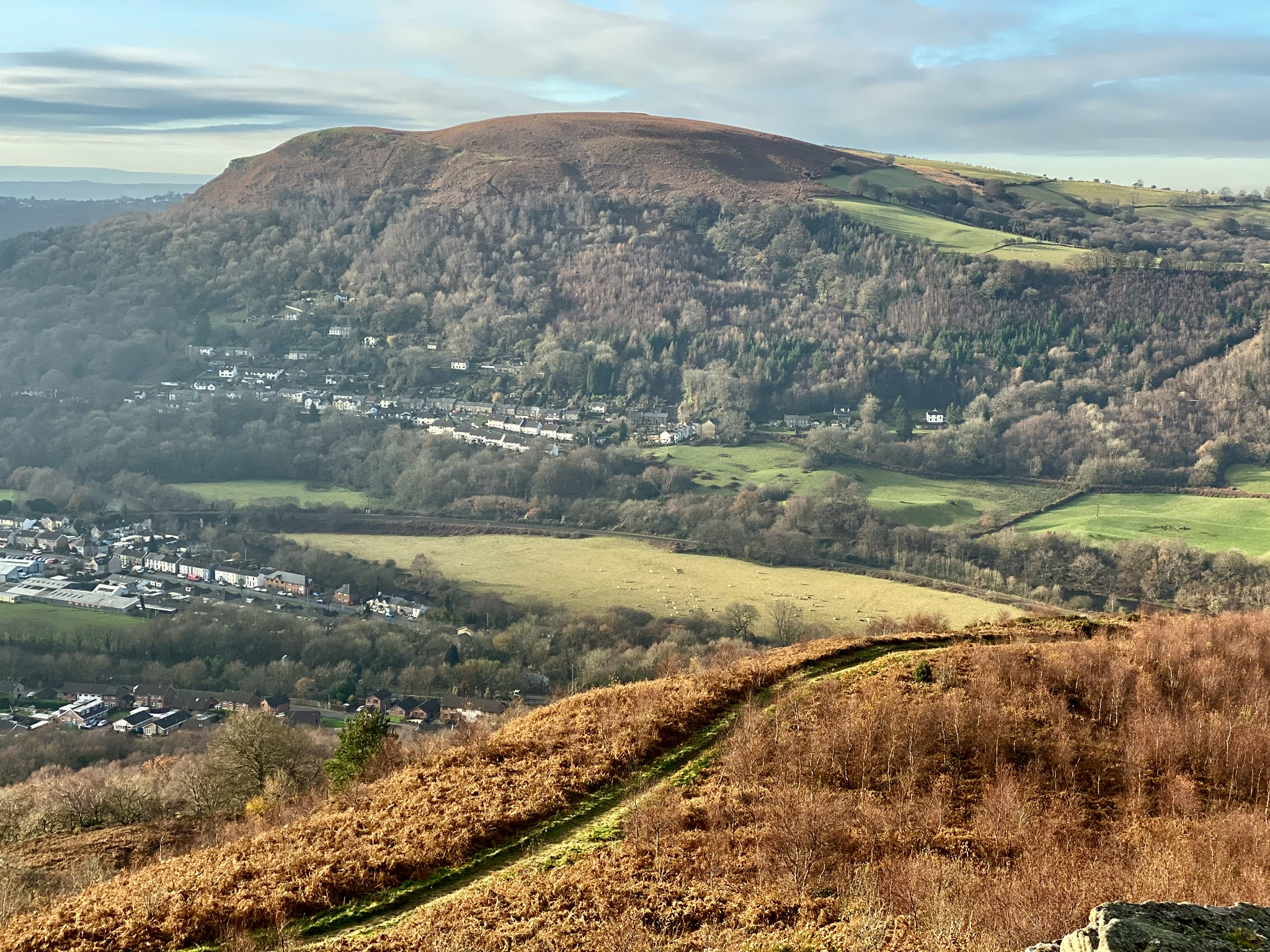

Highest point
- Elevation: 307 m (1,007 ft)
- Prominence: 211 m (692 ft)
- Listing: Marilyn, County top
- Coordinates: 51°32′35.66″N 3°17′41.53″W

Geography
- Location within Wales
- Location: Cardiff, Wales
- OS grid: ST103835

Garth Hill (usually called The Garth, or Garth Mountain; Welsh: Mynydd y Garth) is a hill located in between the communities of Llantwit Fardre and Pentyrch in Wales. The Garth can be seen from nearly the whole of the city of Cardiff and the Taff Valley, and on a sunny, clear day as far as Weston-super-Mare across the Bristol Channel in southwest England and north to Pen y Fan in the Brecon Beacons. It lies adjacent to the Taff Vale with the village of Pentyrch on one side and looks down onto the small villages of Gwaelod-y-Garth and Taff's Well.

The Garth has a number of tumuli on its top. These are burial sites dating from the early to middle Bronze Age.

Views of Cardiff and the Taff valley are obtained from the prominent crag.

The Garth has a sister hill, the Lesser Garth. The Lesser Garth is of limestone, which is extensively quarried with much of the hill removed; it was also formerly mined for iron ore. The valley between the two is eroded in softer coal measures, shales in the main, while the Garth is formed of the resistant Pennant sandstone formation.

Until the 19th century, the valley and the lower slopes of the Garth facing Taff's Well were full of small coal mines which fed the ironworks below in the River Taff valley, opposite Taff's Well. There is now little trace of these although Y Lan Colliery has recently had its portal partly restored as a memorial to an explosion in 1875. A cleared path now leads to this, near the primary school. The access road to Pentyrch village, Heol Goch, runs between the main and lesser Garth.

Christopher Monger, a native of Taff's Well, wrote and directed the 1995 film The Englishman Who Went up a Hill but Came down a Mountain. The location of the fictional Ffynnon Garw above the writer's home village suggests that it is the Garth, and the mound on which the trigonometrical point stands is a Bronze Age burial mound. The popularity of the film has resulted in a stream of visitors climbing to the summit of the Garth to view the location.

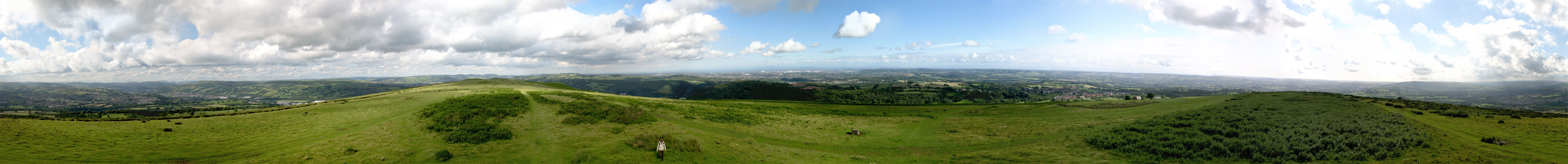
Panoramic view from The Garth
