= Taff's Well =

Taff's Well: Welsh: Ffynnon Taf
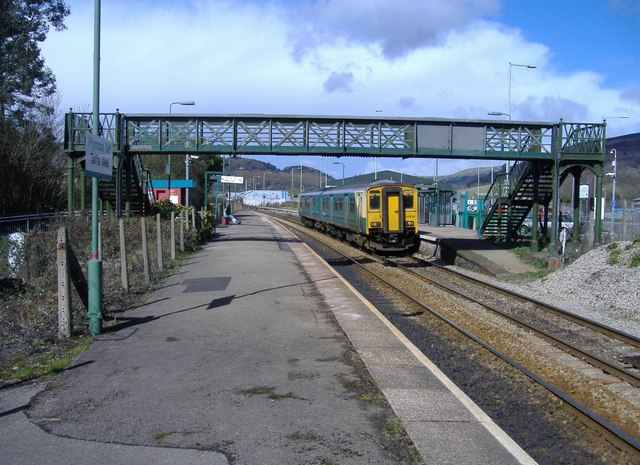
- Taffs Well railway station

- Location within Rhondda Cynon Taf
- Population: 3,672 (2011)
- OS grid reference: ST121834
- Community: Taff’s Well & Nantgarw
- Principal area: Rhondda Cynon Taf
- Preserved county: Mid Glamorgan
- Country: Wales
- Sovereign state: United Kingdom
- Post town: CARDIFF
- Postcode district: CF15
- Dialling code: 029
- Police: South Wales
- Fire: South Wales
- Ambulance: Welsh
- UK Parliament: Cardiff North
- Senedd Cymru – Welsh Parliament: Pontypridd
- List of places UK Wales Rhondda Cynon Taf 51.543°N 3.269°W Community map: Map of the community

Taff's Well (Welsh: Ffynnon Taf) is a semi-rural village, community and electoral ward located at the south-eastern tip of Rhondda Cynon Taf, 6 miles (9.7 km) north-west of the city centre of Cardiff, the capital of Wales. Known locally as the "Gates to the Valleys" by some and considered part of the Valleys by others, it is separated from Gwaelod-y-Garth by the River Taff. Taff's Well is distinguished because it contains the only thermal spring in Wales. The tepid water is thought to rise along a fault-line from the Carboniferous Limestone, in somewhat similar manner to the warm springs at Bristol and Bath. The Welsh myth of the Taff's Well Turtle originates here. Various religious groups regard it as a spiritual site.

Garth Hill overlooks the village and was the inspiration for the fictional Ffynnon Garw, featured in the book and film The Englishman Who Went up a Hill but Came down a Mountain.

== Name ==
The name "Taff's Well" is derived from the situation of the village alongside the River Taff and the presence of the warm spring within Taff's Well Park.

== Thermal spring ==
Taff's Well Park (Welsh: Parc Ffynnon Taf) is the site of the Taff's Well Thermal Spring, a well that reached its height of popularity for visitors to the village in the mid to late 1800s. The average temperature of the water is 21.6 °C (70.9 °F). The well is Wales's only natural thermal spa.

== Location ==
Taff's Well lies just off Junction 32 of the M4 motorway and at the southern end of the A470.

Though administered by Rhondda Cynon Taff Council, Taff's Well is a commuter town for the City of Cardiff, where many of its residents work.

== Culture ==
=== 19th century ===
Taff's Well grew into an important railway junction during the mid- to late 19th century, when Cardiff was a major global exporter of coal.

Taff's Well is a growing community which includes numerous districts: Glan-y-Llyn, Rhiw Ddar and Glan-y-Fordd; Ty-Rhillage centre that consists of Alfred's terrace, Anchor Street, Church Street, Garth Street, Yew Street and Ty Rhiw through which the Taff Trail runs. Taff's Well is next to Castell Coch, which overlooks Cardiff.

=== 20th century ===
The actor David Jason spent much time in Taff's Well and based the situation comedy Open All Hours upon Arthur's shop, which is one of many buildings to have been dismantled and sent to the St Fagan's Museum of Welsh Life.

Taff's Well is the original location of the story that inspired the 1995 film The Englishman Who Went up a Hill but Came down a Mountain, by Ivor Monger and Christopher Monger.

=== 21st century ===
Taff's Well has featured in the Sky sitcom Stella, starring Ruth Jones. The post office in Nantgarw is a filming location in the sitcom, although it is just outside the village.

== Local politics ==
Taff's Well is an electoral ward coterminous to the community boundaries and elects a county councillor to Rhondda Cynon Taf County Borough Council. Jill Bonetto (Labour) has represented the ward since 2012.

Taff's Well and Nantgarw are also represented locally by the Taff's Well & Nantgarw Community Council, which has 10 members. The Council was criticised in 2010 by the Wales Audit Office for breaching financial and corporate governance regulations with its financial records. Described as 'The worst-run council in Wales', there were calls for the 'wholesale sacking' of the ten members for breaching 'financial and corporate governance regulations because of its "inadequate" financial records, supporting paperwork and minutes between 2002 and 2006'.

== Sport ==
Taff's Well A.F.C. are the local football team. They play in the Cymru South, the second tier of the Welsh football league system.

Taffs Well RFC are the local Rugby union team.

== Transport ==
Taffs Well railway station, which opened in 1863, is on the Rhondda and Merthyr Lines. Services are provided by Transport for Wales northbound to Treherbert, Aberdare and Merthyr Tydfil via Pontypridd, and southbound to Cardiff Queen Street and Cardiff Central. The average journey time to Cardiff Central is 20 minutes at a frequency of six trains per hour.

Stagecoach South Wales bus service 132 between Maerdy and Cardiff Central bus station stops in the village every 15 minutes at peak times.

The A470 road runs through the village between Cardiff Bay (9 miles (14 km) south) and Llandudno (179 miles (288 km) north). Taff's Well is 2 miles (3.2 km) north of junction 32 (Cardiff North) of the M4 motorway.

Taff's Well(since Nov 2025) is the main hub and maintenance HQ for the South Wales Metro.

The former Walnut Tree Viaduct ran across the Taff Valley to the south of Taff's Well. Two of the support columns remain standing.

== Churches ==
Taff's Well has two active churches:

- The Anglican church of St Mary and St James dates from 1879 and is on Church Street. It is a chapel of ease to St Michael's in Tongwynlais. The minister is Rev Zoe King.
- The Nonconformist Taff's Well United Church is on Cardiff Road. It was founded as a Wesleyan Methodist chapel and took on its current name when it merged with the Taff's Well Baptist Church in the late 20th century. The minister is Rev Cathy Gale.

Like the neighbouring community of Tongwynlais, Taff's Well formerly had a number of other churches which have ceased to function and have either been converted to other purposes or been demolished:

- The Tabor Calvinistic Methodist Church was built on what became Tabor Street in 1843. It was rebuilt in 1864. It closed c. 1990 and is now a commercial premises.
- The Glandwr Taf Welsh Independent Chapel was built in 1859. It was modified in 1898 (or 1895) and was rebuilt in 1905, being capable of seating 250. It is now a private residence.
- The Tabernacle English Baptist Chapel on the corner of Garth and King Streets was built in 1906. Its congregation later merged to form Taff's Well United Church. After the merger, the chapel was demolished and the site is now occupied by housing.
- The Glan-Y-Llyn Gospel Hall formerly stood on Stradmore Close. It closed in January 2017 and the site has been redeveloped.

== Cemetery ==
Ty Rhiw cemetery in Taff's Well was one of several cemeteries in Rhondda Cynon Taf where bodies were buried in the wrong graves. The errors were discovered in the early 2000s and resulted in a police investigation. In 2009, Taffs Well and Nantgarw Community Council planned to reuse the chapel at the cemetery for weddings and funerals, as was originally intended. A campaign against the decision was led by the Friends of Ty Rhiw Cemetery. There are seven Commonwealth War Graves Commission memorials in the cemetery, marking the burial place of British sailors and soldiers from the First and Second World Wars.

== Gallery ==
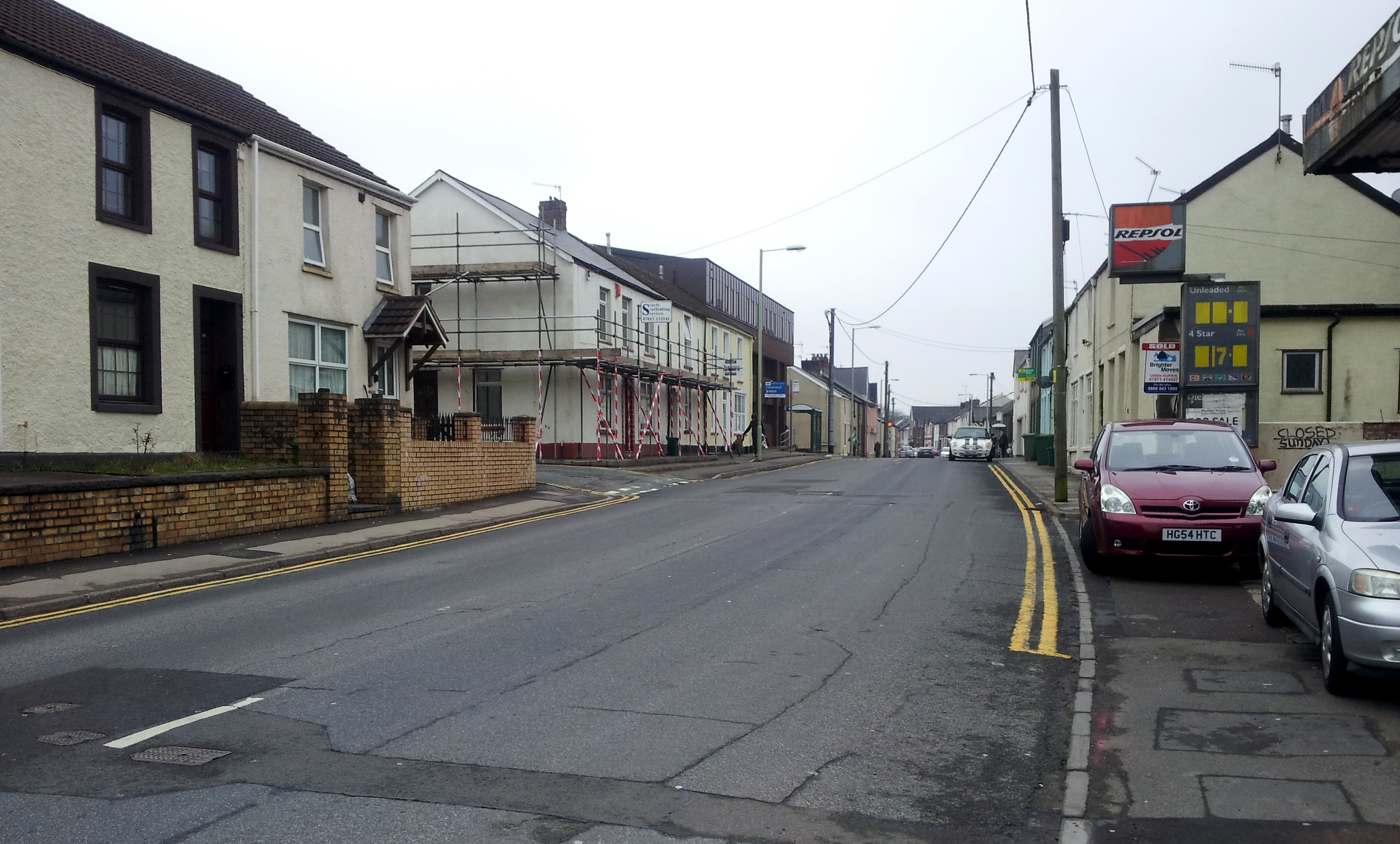
The main road through Taff's Well

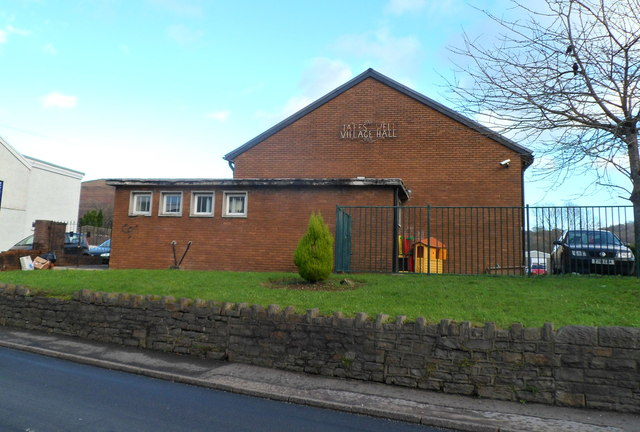
Taff's Well Village Hall

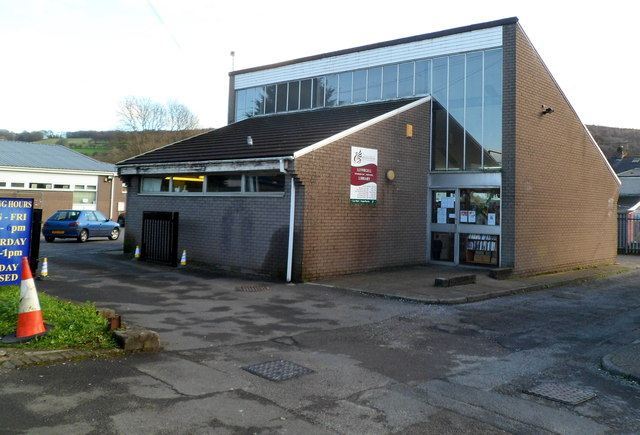
Taff's Well public library

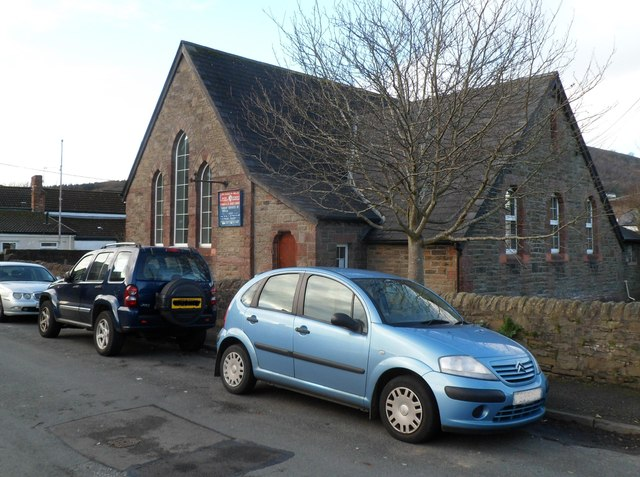
St Mary & St James' Church

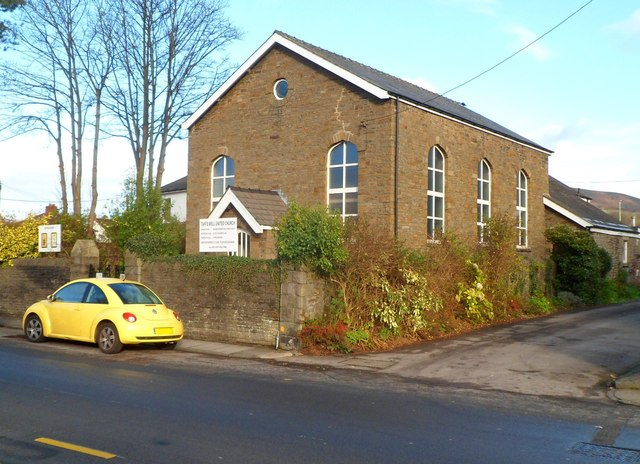
Taff's Well United Church

== Notable people ==
- Sir Thomas Lewis CBE FRS FRCP (1881–1945), cardiologist
- Tom Lewis (1904–1994), rugby player
- Bleddyn Williams MBE (1923–2009), rugby player
- Bob Shaw (born 1932), hurdler
- Lloyd Williams (1933–2017), rugby player
- Christopher Monger (born 1950), film screenwriter, director and editor
- Tom James (born 1996), footballer
