= Pentyrch =

Village and community in Cardiff, Wales

- Location within Cardiff
- Population: 3,483 (2011)
- OS grid reference: ST101819
- Community: Pentyrch
- Principal area: Cardiff
- Preserved county: South Glamorgan
- Country: Wales
- Sovereign state: United Kingdom
- Post town: CARDIFF
- Postcode district: CF15
- Dialling code: 029
- Police: South Wales
- Fire: South Wales
- Ambulance: Welsh
- UK Parliament: Cardiff West
- Senedd Cymru – Welsh Parliament: Cardiff West
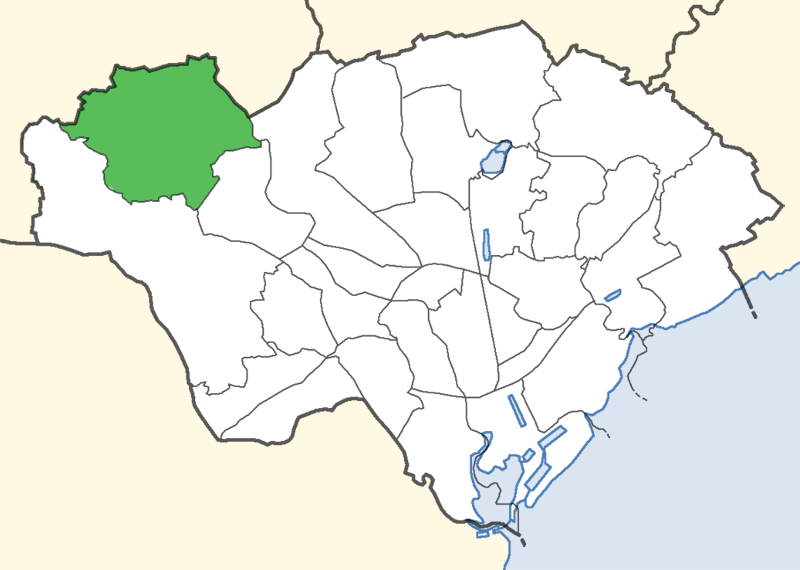
- List of places UK Wales Cardiff 51.52883°N 3.29735°W

Pentyrch (sometimes Welsh: Pen-tyrch; Welsh pronunciation: [pɛnˈtɪrχ]) is a village and community located on the western outskirts of Cardiff, the capital city of Wales. The village gives its name to a Cardiff local authority electoral ward, Pentyrch, which covers the village and immediate surrounding area. The Pentyrch community includes the neighbouring village of Creigiau and Gwaelod y Garth. People living in Pentyrch are commonly known as "Pentyrchians".

On 26 February 2016, multiple witnesses reported seeing UFOs.

== Geography ==
The village is situated approximately 6 miles north-west of Cardiff city centre, next to the Garth Mountain, high above the River Taff.

The village can be reached from junction 32 of the M4 Motorway, then A470, then via Heol Goch, a hill flanked by a quarry and nature reserve. Alternatively, Church Road provides access from Llantrisant Road near St Fagans.

Other approaches are from Creigiau and Gwaelod-y-Garth.

There was a separate location, Pentyrch Crossing, a flat railway crossing believed to have been removed in the 1960s, between Morganstown and the River Taff.

== Demographics ==
At the 2001 census, Pentyrch contained 3,535 individuals, in 1,358 households.

== Governance ==
Pentyrch became the newest addition to the Cardiff unitary authority in 1996. The electoral ward of Pentyrch & St Fagans elects three councillors to Cardiff Council.

It falls within the parliamentary constituency of Cardiff West and is represented by the Labour Party in the House of Commons and the Senedd.

In October 2021 Cardiff Council accepted a number of ward change proposals made by the Local Democracy and Boundary Commission for Wales. These included the merger of Creigiau/St Fagans with the Pentyrch ward to form a new ward of "Pentyrch and St Fagans". This would take effect from the 2022 council election.

The ward is bounded by Rhondda Cynon Taf to the north; and by the wards of Whitchurch & Tongwynlais to the east; Radyr & Morganstown to the southeast; Fairwater to the south and Ely to the southwest.

=== Local elections ===
Pentyrch was represented by Conservative councillor Craig Williams on Cardiff Council until he stepped down in 2015, following his election to Parliament for Cardiff North. He was defeated two years later in the 2017 General Election by the Labour Party's Anna McMorrin.

Craig Williams was one of the Conservative members involved in a well-publicised scandal, alleged to have placed a bet on the date of the 2024 General Election, just three days before it was announced.

A by-election for the Pentyrch ward took place on Tuesday, 30 June 2015 which, despite a 27% swing to Plaid Cymru's Hywel Wigley, resulted in a narrow win for Conservative candidate Gavin Hill-John by 18 votes.

At the Cardiff Council election on 4 May 2017 Cllr Hill-John successfully defended his seat, increasing the margin between himself and Hywel Wigley to 215 votes. The turnout was 56%.

At the 2022 City of Cardiff Council election on 5 May 2022, under the new ward boundary, two Common Ground Alliance councillors (a Plaid Cymru, Green Party alliance) were elected with 1,289 and 1,241 votes, while a Conservative councillor was elected with 1,170. Turnout was 46.5%. The Common Ground Alliance won the new third seat created by the boundary change, took the vote swing in one of the existing seats and the Conservative group held a seat.

=== Community Council ===
The Pentyrch Community Council has thirteen elected (or co-opted) members, representing the villages of Pentyrch, Creigiau (including Capel Llanilltern) and Gwaelod y Garth (the three community wards) on a ratio of 6:5:2.

Elections are held every five years.

==== 2017 Community Council Election ====
Ten candidates (6 Independent, 3 Welsh Labour, 1 Plaid Cymru) stood for election during the 2017 Cardiff Council election. All candidates were therefore elected unopposed.

The following by-elections took place between May 2017 and the next election in 2022.

Pentyrch Ward - Thursday, 19 March 2020
| Party | Candidate | Votes | % | ±% |
|---|---|---|---|---|
| Independent | Ian Jones | 190 | | |
| Conservative | Gary Dixon | 126 | | |
| Turnout | | 316 | 16.6 | |

Pentyrch Ward - Friday, 9 November 2018
| Party | Candidate | Votes | % | ±% |
|---|---|---|---|---|
| Independent | Simon Roberts | No contest | | |

Political affiliation recorded as 'Welsh Conservative' on the Pentyrch Community Council website (March 2020).

Creigiau Ward - Thursday, 23 August 2018
| Party | Candidate | Votes | % | ±% |
|---|---|---|---|---|
| Independent | Jena Quilter | No contest | | |

Political affiliation recorded as 'Welsh Conservative' on the Pentyrch Community Council website (March 2020).

== Amenities ==
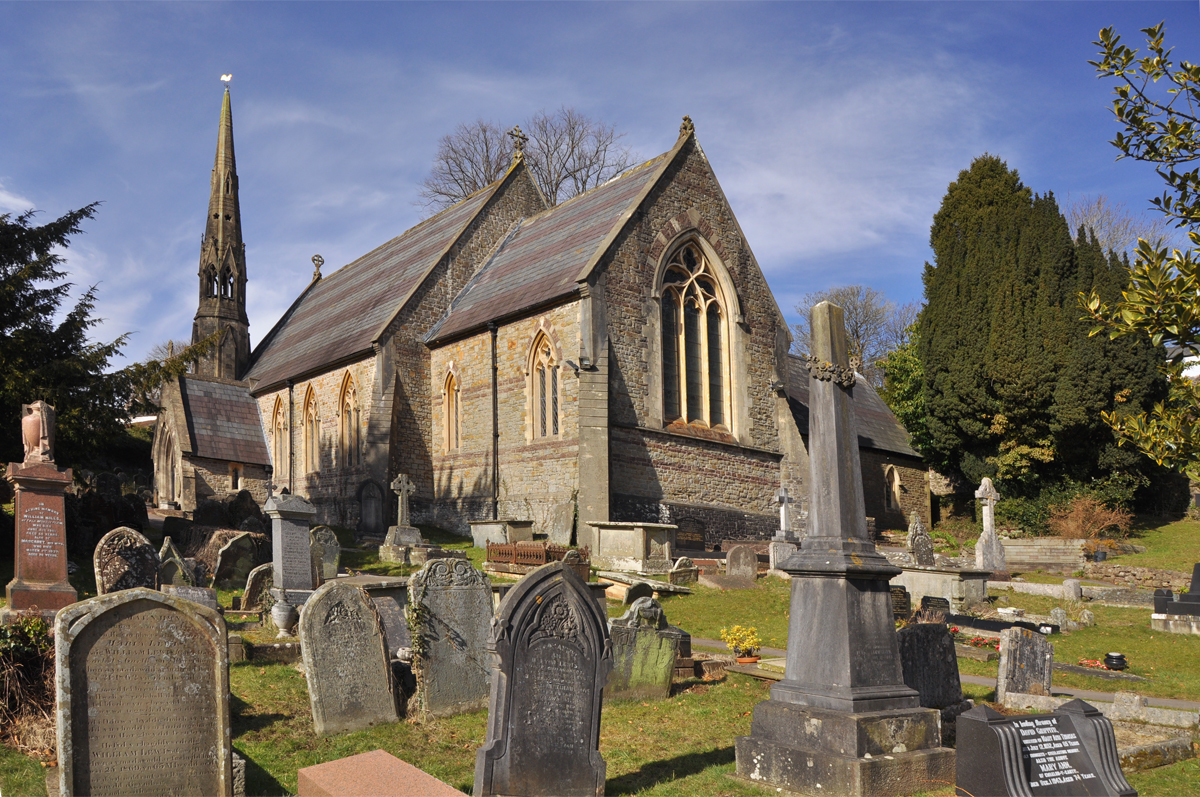
St Catwg's Church

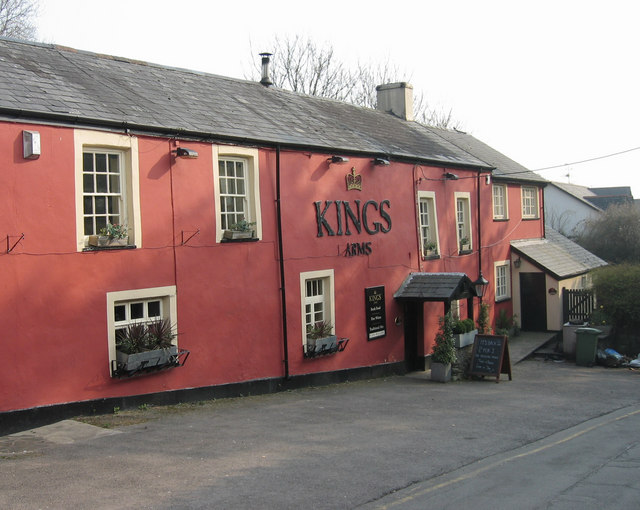
King's Arms pub, Pentyrch

Acapela Studio, a concert hall and recording studio, is owned by harpist Catrin Finch and music and television producer Hywel Wigley. Acapela studio has hosted a series of Welsh acts such as Gruff Rhys, Cerys Matthews and Charlotte Church as well as local and international music acts. Many programmes for S4C and the BBC are filmed there. The building itself is converted from the former presbyterian Capel Horeb. Opposite Acapela is the Lewis Arms public house.

Housing is split between older housing and large post-1970s developments. The older buildings in the village are reached by forking left after entering the village, travelling down to the King's Arms pub, and St. Catwg's Church, at the lowest point of the village. Along with St. Catwg's Church and its lychgate, the King's Arms is a Grade II Listed building. Originally a seventeenth-century copyhold farm called Cae Golman, the King's Arms became established as a public house in the eighteenth century. The bar has a fireplace with a chamfered beam, dated 1711. Sport in the village is centred on the Pentyrch Rugby Football Club. There is also a cricket pitch and other facilities at the club. Pentyrch Rangers football club is based in the village. The club has nearly 200 registered players and runs 10 junior and mini football teams in the Cardiff and District League. Other amenities include a village hall and primary school.

Craig-y-parc House, in wooded grounds outside the village, is a former country house, now a residential school for children and young adult with disabilities. Designed by Charles Edward Mallows for the colliery owner Thomas Evans, and built between 1914 and 1918, it is a Grade II* listed building.

== Notable people ==
- Lucie Jones, singer and model
- Robin Sowden-Taylor, rugby player, raised in Pentyrch
- Craig Williams MP, lived in Pentyrch and served as Cardiff City Councillor for Pentyrch ward from 2008 to 2015
