= Christopher Monger =

Welsh film director

- Born: 1950 (age 75–76); Taff's Well, Cardiff, Wales
- Occupations: Film director, screenwriter
- Years active: 1978–present
- Spouse: Karen Montgomery (d. 2015)

Christopher Monger (born 1950) is a Welsh screenwriter, director and editor, best known for writing and directing The Englishman who Went up a Hill but Came down a Mountain and writing the HBO biopic Temple Grandin. He has directed eight feature films and written over thirty screenplays.

== Early life ==
Monger was born in Taff's Well, Wales, attending boarding school in Taunton, Somerset.

Monger made his first no-budget features there including the controversial Voice Over (1981) which played festivals and was sold throughout the world.

At the same time, he was film and video producer for the avant-garde theatre company Moving Being, regularly touring throughout Western Europe with shows such as Brecht in 1984 and The Influence of the Moon on the Tides.

After the success of Voice Over, he was invited to show his films at the Museum of Modern Art in New York City, and shortly thereafter he moved to Los Angeles to work with producer Ed Pressman of Badlands fame.

== Short films ==
His graduation short, a comic rendering of the life of Tang dynasty Chinese poet Han Shan, Cold Mountain, was the opening film of the first ever British Festival of Independent Film in 1974.

== Later work ==
As a director, his credits include: The Englishman who Went up a Hill but Came down a Mountain (1995) for Miramax Films, which he later adapted into a novel of the same name. It stars Hugh Grant, Colm Meaney, Tara Fitzgerald and Harry Kretchmer. The Englishman et cetera was entered into the 19th Moscow International Film Festival He directed Waiting for the Light, starring Shirley MacLaine and Teri Garr. Also, Crime Pays for Film Four International, starring Ronnie Williams and Veronica Quilligan, and Voice Over starring Ian McNeice.

He wrote the television film Seeing Red for Granada and WGBH, for which he received a Christopher Award; and wrote and directed Girl from Rio, which won the Hollywood Film Festival.

His documentary, Special Thanks to Roy London, premiered at the Tribeca Film Festival and went on to win several awards. In 2007 he adapted Kaiulani Lee's stage play A Sense of Wonder, based on the life of Silent Spring author Rachel Carson, into a film. Shot by Haskell Wexler and produced by Karen Montgomery, the film has been screened throughout North America.

In 2010 he wrote the script for the HBO biopic, Temple Grandin. Starring Claire Danes as Temple Grandin, with David Strathairn, Julia Ormond and Catherine O'Hara, it was directed by Mick Jackson. Monger was nominated for an Emmy for his screenplay.

Apart from his film work he still paints and is a member of the Pharmaka group of painters in Los Angeles, who opened one of the first galleries in Gallery Row in Downtown Los Angeles.

== Filmography ==
Film

Year	Title	Director	Writer	Producer	Editor
1979	Repeater	Yes	Yes	Yes	Yes
1981	Voice Over	Yes	Yes	Yes	Yes
1990	Waiting for the Light	Yes	Yes	No	No
1992	Just Like a Woman	Yes	No	No	No
1995	The Englishman who Went up a Hill but Came down a Mountain	Yes	Yes	No	No
2001	Girl from Rio	Yes	Yes	No	No
2005	Special Thanks to Roy London	Yes	No	No	Yes
2007	Sense of Wonder	Yes	No	No	No
2023	Widow Clicquot	No	Yes	No	No

Television

Year	Title	Director	Writer	Notes
2000	Seeing Red	No	Yes	TV movie
2000–2002	That's Life	Yes	No	4 episodes
2010	Temple Grandin	No	Yes	TV movie
2012	Liz & Dick	No	Yes	TV movie
