= Old Iron Bridge, Merthyr Tydfil =

Cast-iron bridge over the River Taff, Wales

Coordinates: 51.7463°N 3.3820°W

The Old Iron Bridge of 1800, originally known simply as Merthyr Bridge before 1809, in Merthyr Tydfil, South Wales, was a cast-iron bridge across the River Taff.

Although an important early example of iron bridge-building and well known as a local landmark within living memory, the bridge has largely disappeared from engineering history.

== Early iron bridges ==
The Iron Bridge across the Severn near Coalbrookdale opened in 1781 and is generally regarded as the world's first cast-iron bridge. It had little immediate influence on bridge design and few other important iron bridges were built as a result. (Note: Wearmouth Bridge in Sunderland was the only one of note.) However a flood in 1795 washed away many bridges on the Severn, but the Iron Bridge survived. This survival had more influence on bridge design, as did the completion of Wearmouth Bridge the following year. Cast iron was now established as a viable material for bridges and a number were produced in the years immediately afterwards. (Note: Thomas Telford's Buildwas Bridge and Coalport Bridge, just downstream from Iron Bridge, being two significant ones.)

== Earlier bridges in Merthyr ==
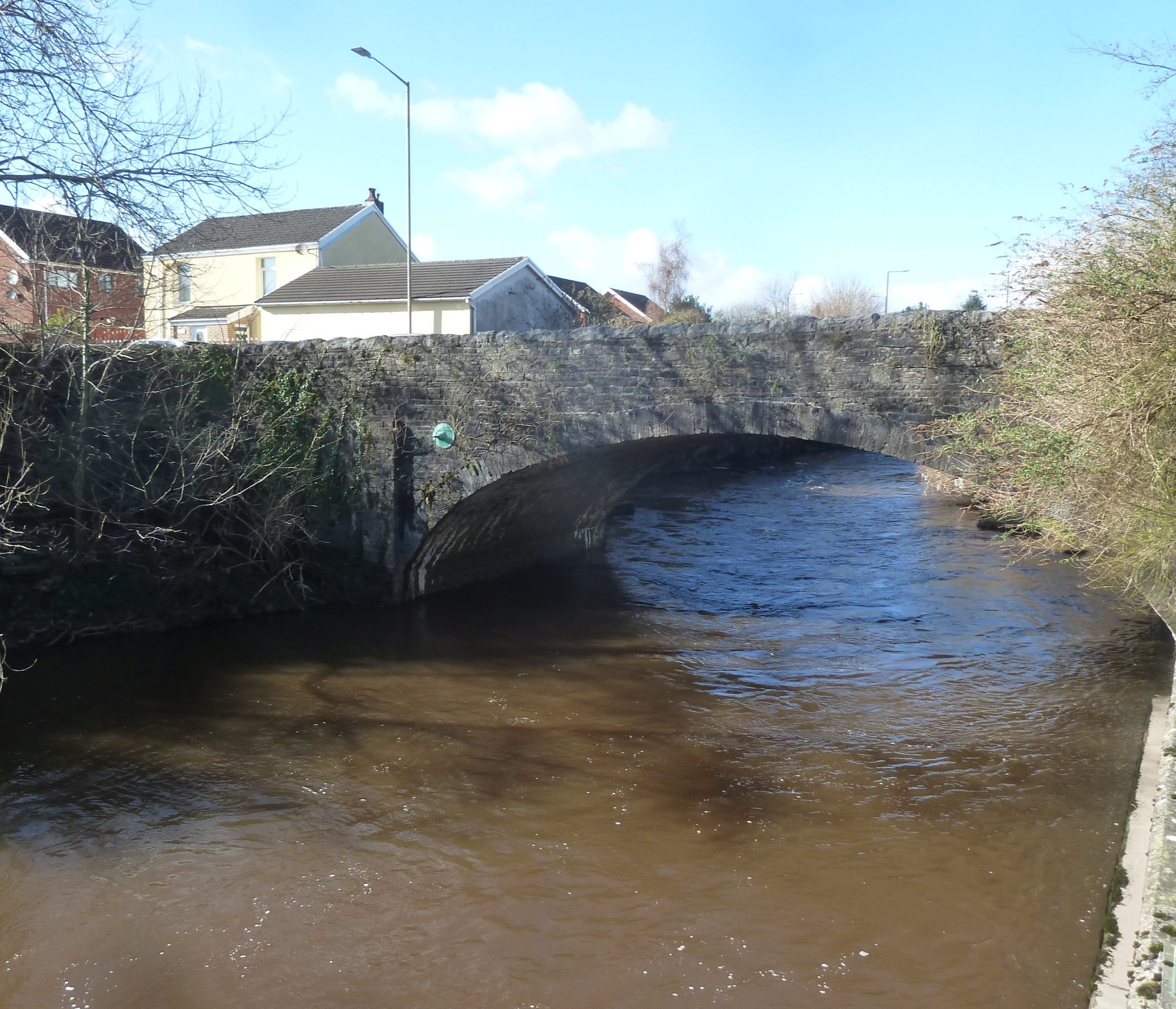
Jackson's Bridge, still standing and now the oldest surviving bridge in Merthyr Tydfil

Richard Crawshay's Cyfarthfa Ironworks was on the West bank of the River Taff, the opposite side from the centre of the developing town.

The previous stone bridge had collapsed in the winter of 1798–99. This left the only bridge across the Taff as Jackson's Bridge, which had been built in 1793 by the Dowlais Iron Company. This was an inconvenience to the inhabitants of Merthyr, many of whom now worked for the Cyfartha ironworks, who needed to cross the river to get to the works. Rivalry between the ironmasters was also intense and it was a matter of prestige for Cyfartha workers to not be dependent upon another company's bridge.

Small iron bridges already existed at Merthyr, crossing the Glamorganshire Canal. This was a far smaller watercourse than the Taff and only needed a simple single-panel bridge. One of these still survives, although now only kept as a monument in a park. (Note: See Iron canal bridge from Rhydycar)

== Construction ==
Richard Crawshay commissioned a new bridge and had Watkin George, his principal engineer at Cyfartha and who had also designed the nearby Pont-y-Cafnau in 1792, design it. The bridge was built in 1799 and opened at the end of April 1800.

The river needed a span of around 70 ft (21 m), which was too much to have been cast in one piece, or then installed, with the equipment of the time. Although structurally an arch bridge, the bridge was cast in three sections, each almost straight. The outer panels were straight, the centre had a rise of 4 in (100 mm) in its 26 ft (7.9 m) length. The sides of the bridge were cast as three rectangular panels, including their balustrade. The ends of the arch were supported on triangular cantilever brackets, cast in two sections. The abutments of the bridge were stone, battered back with sloping faces so that they met the ends of the arch panels perpendicularly. Where the iron castings abutted against each other was packed with oak planks, two or three inches thick and the width of the iron parts. These were bolted through and clamped. The intention was to give the iron structure some degree of flexibility, as otherwise it would be too brittle. However the short life of the timber gave trouble twenty years later and the bridge required extensive repairs.

The balustrade of the bridge did not form a structural part of it, although it was cast in situ with the main panels. There were three perpendicular uprights to each panel, with strips forming a pair of intertwined waves between them, giving an 'X' shape in each of the four spaces. These were cast integrally, but had the appearance of wrought ironwork. Three horizontal strips of wrought iron were riveted to the back, to make the gaps in the balustrade smaller, and these appear to have been added later. Its parapet also included 'heart-shaped' motifs at the centre of the bridge, distinctive to the work of Watkin George.

The deck of the bridge was formed of cast iron crossbeams. These were an inverted T in section, six inches on each arm and 3/4" in section thickness. With a length of twelve feet, they gave a useful carriageway 10.5 ft (3.2 m) wide. These crossbeams may have been added in the extensive 1817 repairs. The surface of the bridge was formed of stone setts or cobbles, but these gave a poor surface for walking as they were uneven between the gaps and slippery in rain. In later years the surface was dressed smooth with a layer of the abundant ironworks slag.

The iron sections are thought to have been cast in open-backed single-sided sand moulds, as one surface shows evidence of surface bubbles. (Note: More advanced casting techniques would use an enclosed mould, and with the surface restricted to a small runner and riser, which would be cut off afterwards.)

== Repairs ==
A series of inspections and repairs were made to the bridge, at two year intervals, from 1801 to 1809. Most of these were to the stonework of the bridge abutments or the stone retaining walls of the riverbank, particularly for improvements to reduce the effects of flooding. The 1809 report on its condition was the first time the name 'Iron Bridge' was recorded.

=== 1817 repairs ===
In 1817, major repairs were made to the ironwork of the bridge itself. William Williams, Watkin George's successor as chief engineer of the ironworks, made a report on its condition and recommended that an iron decking of flat plates should be applied over the existing structure, then a pavement of stone or iron treads be applied over that. The work carried out is not known, but the costs of it exceeded those that would be expected for a mere re-surfacing. The total cost £354 1s 10 1/2d, with £196 11s 6d paid for castings and £147 0s 2 1/2d for labour. Williams was paid 10 guineas for his involvement.

It has been suggested that the cross girders directly beneath the surface of the bridge had been installed during the 1817 repairs, their cost explaining the large sum of paid for castings.

1816 and 1817 were boom years for the building of iron bridges in Britain and many surviving bridges date from this period. (Note: The Wye Bridge, Chepstow, being a typical example.) Waterloo had ended land warfare in Europe but this led to widespread economic and civil disruption. Despite this, ironmasters sought markets for their increasing capacity and to recover the lost markets for military ordnance. Roadbuilding and bridge projects could stimulate a local economy and trade, whilst also providing employment to the demobilised soldiers.

=== 1852 repairs ===
The 1852 report was carried out Henry Wren, Superintendent of the local Board of Health. He found that the bridge was significantly decayed, particularly the timber packing between the castings. He went so far as to suggest that the bridge was both unsafe in its current state and that it was beyond economic repair, largely due to the need to dismantle it almost completely. He suggested instead that the first consideration be given to a replacement, and that this replacement should be in the location of the later Ynysgau Bridge. Such a bridge could be wider, better suited to vehicles, and would be aligned with the two main roads on each side of the river.

However a committee of three was tasked with deciding on what to do with the bridge and they chose instead to repair it. The cost was £66 12s 6 1/2d, more than half of which was for timberwork.

=== 1860 report ===
By 1860, after a long delay, the Board of Health decided to seriously consider replacement and began with a traffic survey of the current bridge. For a week in June–July, daily traffic from 8am to 8pm was counted:

	Pedestrians	Horses	Carriages	Carts	Cattle	Weather
Monday	9,218	129	5	267	17	showers
Tuesday	8,080	141	7	347	113	fine
Wednesday	4,837	68	3	188	185	wet
Thursday	6,687	111	3	302	137	wet
Friday	7,597	120	7	381	15	wet / fine
Saturday	11,119	131	12	350	31	fine
Sunday	9,938	73	9		9	fine
Total	57,716	773	46	1835	507	

The recommendation was to construct a new bridge and an estimate of £1,700 was given as the cost of this.

== Replacement ==
A replacement bridge was long overdue; apart from the concerns over its structure, its narrowness and the amount of traffic using it led to accidents. In 1872, a young girl lost both her legs after being run down by a cart.

=== Ynsygau Bridge ===
In March 1880, a new and larger bridge, the Ynysgau Bridge, also called the New Iron Bridge, was eventually opened next to the old bridge.

The Ynysgau Chapel (Note: Welsh: "Amongst them") had been built in 1749 on the East bank of the Taff, adjacent to where the first bridge would be built. The Old Bridge has sometimes been referred to as the Ynysgau Bridge, but this is a modern anachronism, after both had been demolished, and the name belongs to the later bridge.

The original bridge crossed the river perpendicularly, so as to be the shortest span. The new bridge was on a skew, giving a straighter alignment between Penry Street on the West and into Victoria Street. (Note: As the name suggests, Victoria Street post-dated the original bridge.) This required a longer bridge, and it was also widened to be more easily capable of carrying vehicle traffic.

This bridge was made of wrought iron as a lattice truss structure. This allowed it to have a flat and horizontal deck all the way across.

=== Removal ===
The bridge remained in use until WWII, although as just a footbridge with bollards to prevent vehicles, after which the ends were fenced off, pending its demolition. However, once again, the bridge's demise was postponed and it remained in use through the 1950s.

In the late 1950s, concern at protecting the town from the river's near annual floods, and the increasing number of motor vehicles, led to a widespread scheme to widen the river and canalise it between robust banks. This included a new, wider, bridge in 1958, just north of the iron bridges, a weir to control flow, and demolition of several buildings adjoining the river.

By September 1963, the bridge was still standing but the surface material had been removed, exposing the cross-girders. The complete bridge had gone by the end of November.

By January 1967, all trace of both iron bridges had been removed and the Taff had new, wider concrete banks. The Ynsgau Chapel was demolished a few months later.

=== Storage ===
Components are still stored in the grounds of Cyfarthfa Castle by Merthyr Tydfil CBC, for possible re-erection. Little is known of them and there are no plans to re-erect them. They are not on general display and many heritage groups are even unaware of their existence. They were photographed there in 2015 by Christopher Tipping. Some damage is evident, either in storage or during demolition.

== See also ==
- Iron Tram Bridge, Robertstown
