= Bethania Chapel, Dowlais =

Former chapel in Dowlais, near Merthyr Tydfil, Wales

Coordinates: 51.7601°N 3.3551°W

Bethania
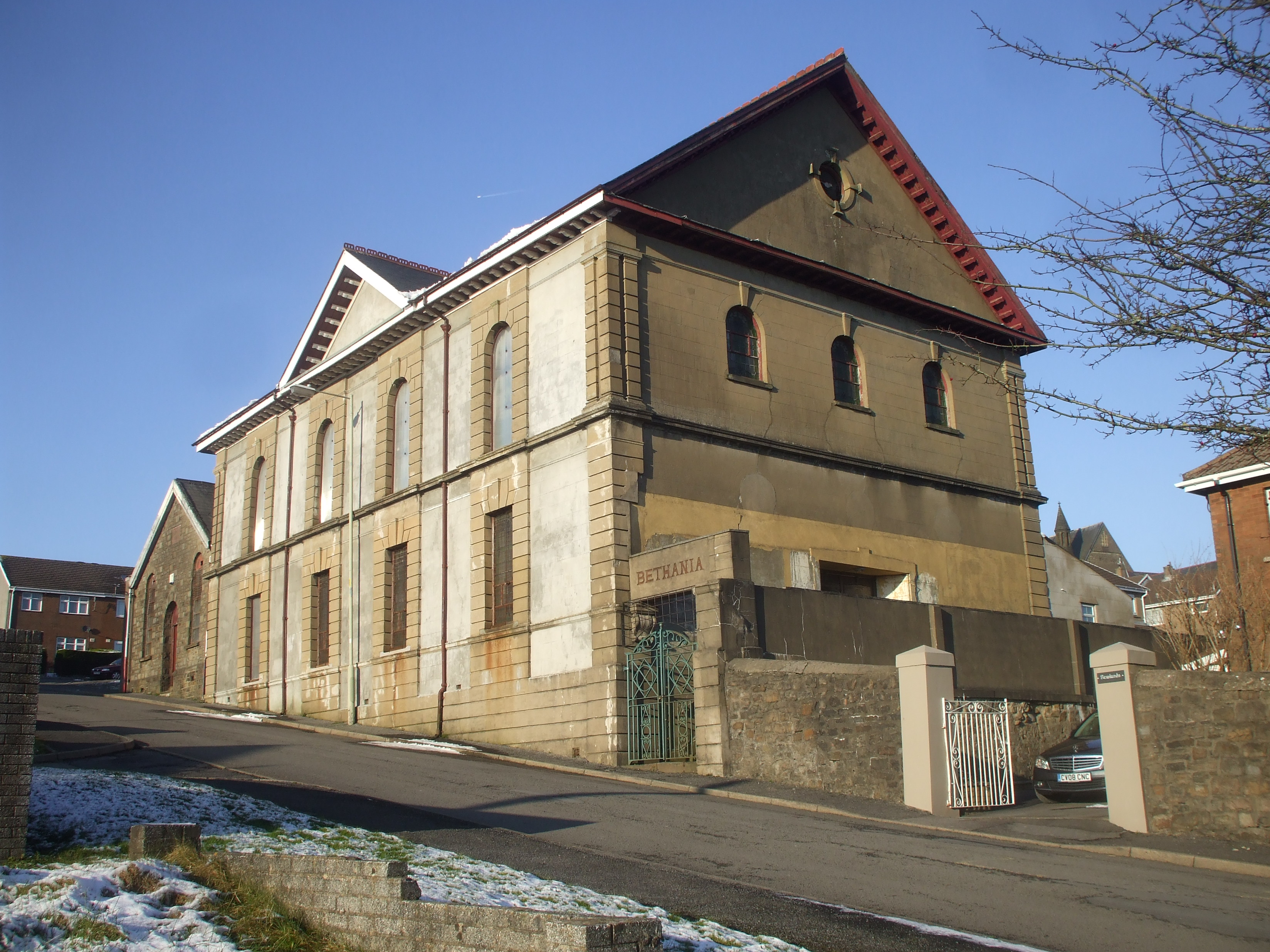
- Bethania
- Location: South Street, Dowlais, Merthyr Tydfil
- Country: Wales
- Denomination: Independent (Congregationalist)

History
- Founded: 1824

Architecture
- Architectural type: Chapel
- Style: late 19th century
- Completed: 1895
- Closed: 1998

Bethania, Dowlais was a Welsh Independent, or Congregationalist, chapel in South Street, Dowlais, near Merthyr Tydfil, South Wales. The cause was established in 1824 and the chapel rebuilt on several occasions in the nineteenth century. The present chapel dates from 1895 but was vastly enlarged and re-modelled in 1910. The building is Grade II listed.

Bethania's origins were as an offshoot of the original Congregationalist chapel at Merthyr, Ynysgau. There was a Congrgationalist tradition at Dowlais before the growth of an industrial community there and the family of Gwernllwynisaf (one of the farms) were prominent in the cause at Ynysgau. One of the early leaders was Methusalem Jones (1769–1839), but following disagreements he withdrew and concentrated on leading the cause at Bethesda, which together with Ynysgau had been instrumental in establishing Bethania.

A revival took place in South Wales in 1829. At the time, Bethania shared its minister with Zoar, Merthyr Tydfil. Samuel Evans, mister at Zoar since 1810, took care of Bethesda from 1828. Evans died in 1833, aged 56

John Hughes became the minister in 1833. Aged 33 at the time, he remained at Bethania for thirty years, the longest pastorate in the chapel's history. Hughes was a native of Capel Iwan in Carmarthenshire and had trained at the Neuaddlwyd Academy in Cardiganshire. A new chapel which could accommodate 1250 people was opened in 1838. By 1848 Bethania had a Sunday School attended by 600 adults and children. During Hughes's pastorate a new branch of Bethania was opened at Gwernllwyn, Dowlais.

On 13 and 14 July 1868, John Evans, a student from Brecon College, was ordained minister at Bethania.

Peter Price was ordained minister at Bethania in 1904 and proved to be a vocal critic of the 1904–05 Religious Revival. Price departed from Bethania in 1910 in acrimonious circumstances.

The chapel closed in 1998 and the building is now used by an evangelical congregation.
