= Melingriffith Tin Plate Works =

Former metalworks in Wales

Coordinates: 51.5114°N 3.2377°W

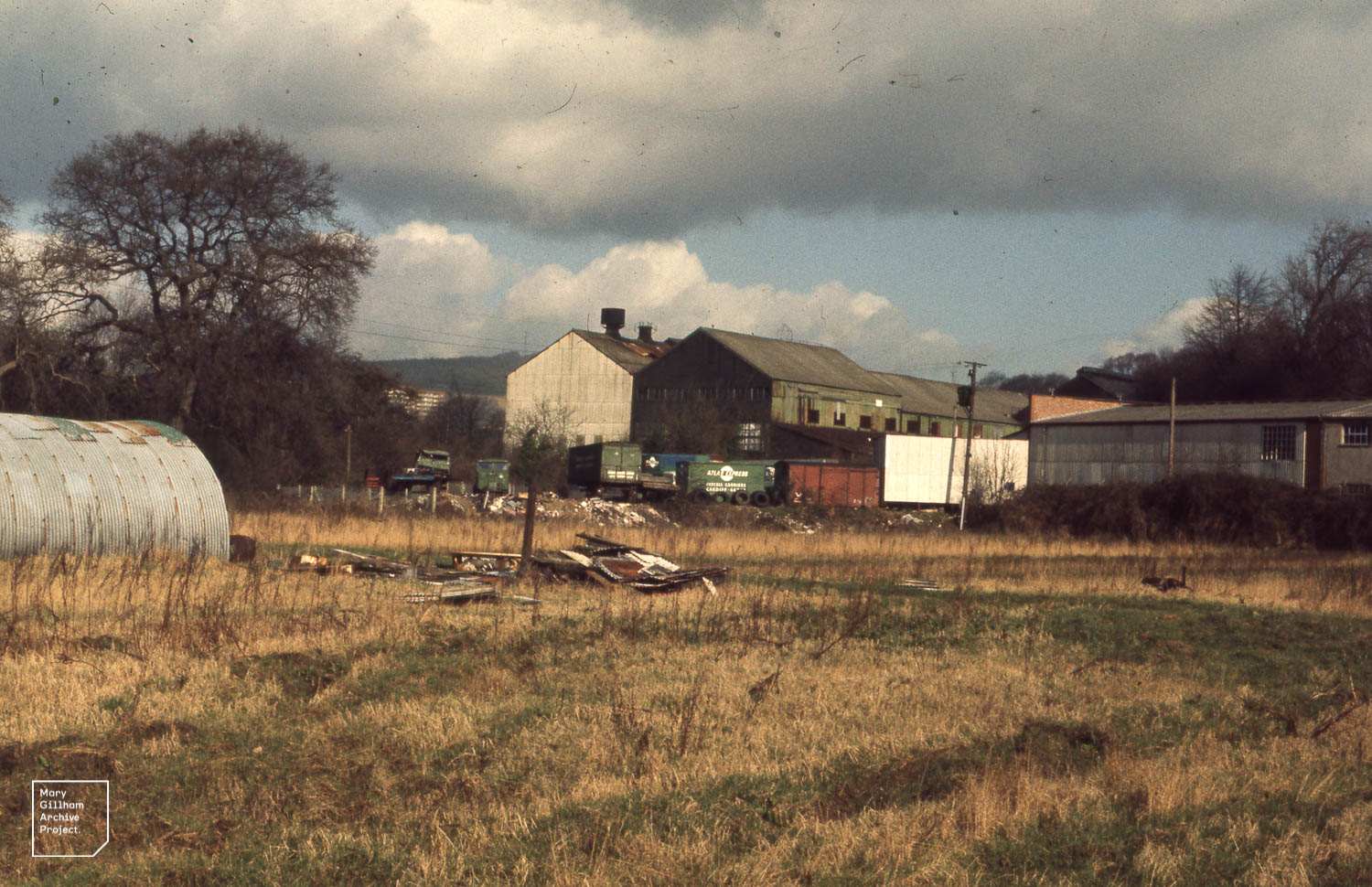
Melingriffith Tin Plate Works (1972)

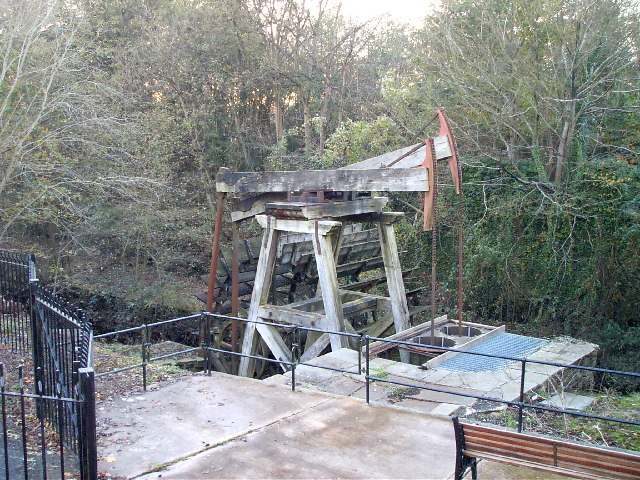
The Melingriffith water pump is a water wheel driven water pump whose purpose was to pump water from the waste stream of the Melingriffith Works back into the Glamorgan Canal. The water pump is a Scheduled Monument.

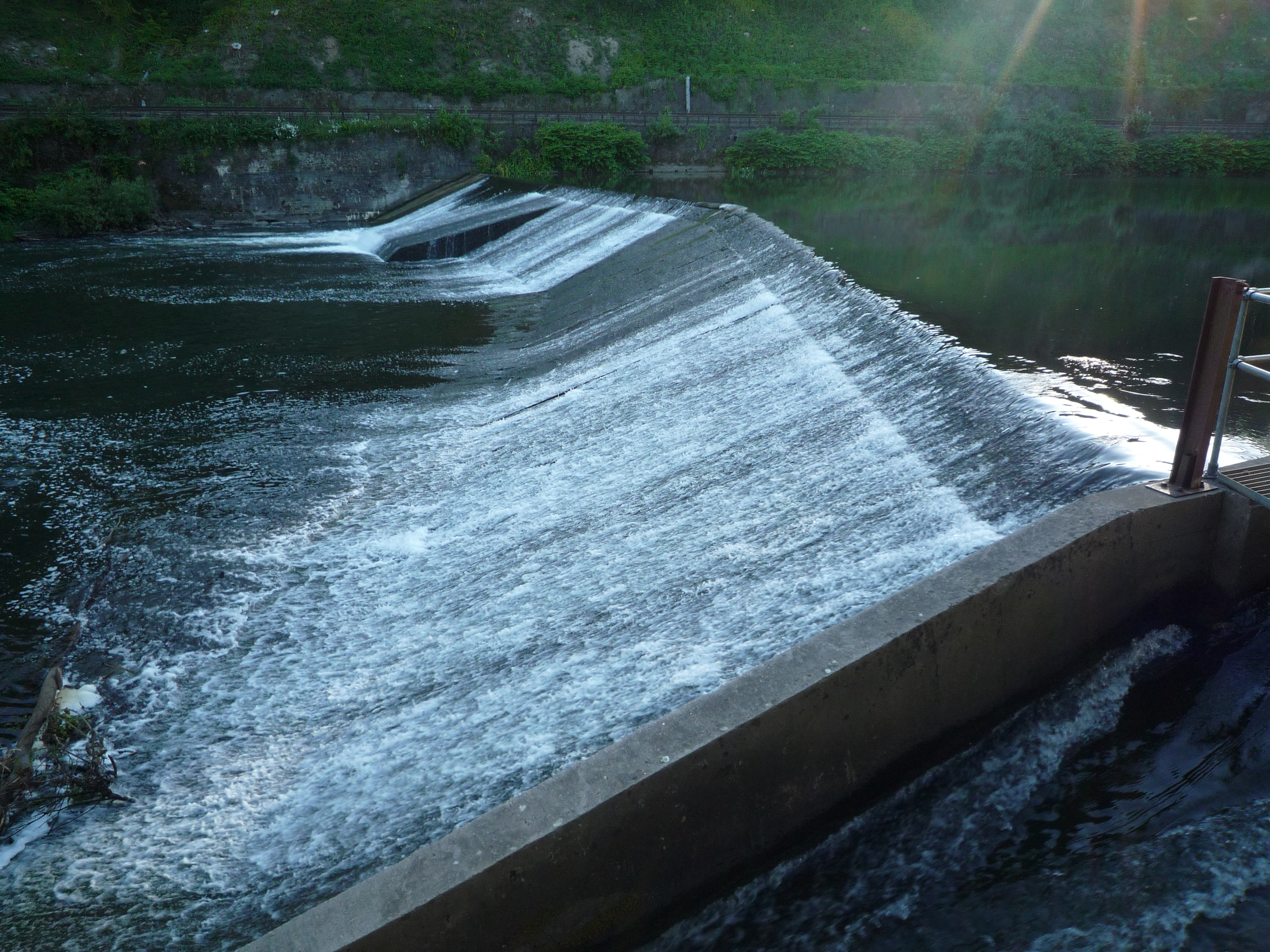
The Radyr Weir provided a water supply to the Works.

The Melingriffith Tin Plate Works (also known as Melingriffith Tin and Iron Works; Welsh: Melingruffydd; meaning: "Griffith's Mill") were post medieval tin and iron works located on Tŷ-mawr Road, in Whitchurch, Cardiff, Wales. Founded sometime before 1750, it was the largest tin-plate works in the world by the end of the 18th century. Subsequent to the closure of tin plate works in 1957, the 200-year-old Melingriffith water pump was named a scheduled monument. It is one of the earliest and most important works of its kind, and may be "the most notable surviving monument of the tinplate industry".

== Site ==
Melingriffith Works was situated on the east bank of the River Taff, on a narrow site between the river and the Glamorganshire Canal. The works covered an area of 4 acres (1.6 ha). They were connected to the canal and by a railway to the Pentyrch Iron Works at Taff's Well about 3 miles (5 km) upriver, including a bridge over the Taff. The eleven rolling mills were situated at a lower level than the other parts of the works in order to take advantage of the fall of the water. The Radyr Weir, situated on the river about 1 mile (1.6 km) above the works, was renewed and strengthened in 1774 to provide a more regular supply of water. Velindre ("the house of the mill") was situated on the crest of a hill which overlooked the works.

== History ==
Prior to the establishment of the tin-plate works, a corn mill was located on the same site. It became the mill of the manor of the Lord of Senghenydd and was referred to as "Melingriffith", deriving from Gruyffydd, who was the son of Ifor Bach, Lord of Senghenydd in the 12th century.

Before manufacturing tinplates, Melingriffith was a forge, with tin plates, iron plates, wire, and other specialties added later. Eventually, the business was worked in conjunction with the "Pentyrch Iron Forge, Blast Furnaces, Collieries and Mine Pits", located at Taff's Well. The Pentyrch Forge (a scheduled monument), and Pentyrch Iron Furnace (a scheduled monument), both being parts of Pentyrch Ironworks, were connected with Melingriffith by the Melingriffith and Pentyrch Railway (a scheduled monument). Melingriffith's mills held names as "Princess," "Volunteer," "Old Forge," "New Forge," "Fly," and "Turbine", but were later referred to by numbers.

After Harford, Partridge and Company, a notable firm of ironmasters in South Wales, extended their operations to the Taff Valley, Richard Blakemore (1775–1855) was added as a partner. Blakemore, also a partner in the Monmouth Forge and nephew of John Partridge, assumed management of the works at the end of the 18th century. Eventually, Blakemore became sole owner and directed its management to 1838. Blakemore raised his nephew, Thomas William Booker-Blakemore at Melingriffith Tin Plate Works, and Booker-Blakemore took over the management of the works after Blakemore's death. After the sudden death of Booker-Blakemore, his three sons, Thomas-William Booker, Richard-Blakemore Booker, and John-Partridge Booker, took over management of the works. Others associated with the Melingriffith Works included the Johns' family, James Spence, and H. W. Martin. The company directors were Sir William Thomas Lewis (Chairman); Edward P. Martin; Richard Thomas, and his son, Richard Beaumont Thomas; H. Spence Thomas and W. R. Davies were at one time joint managing directors.

The works were the largest in the tin-plate trade until 1806. In 1906, there were approximately 530 employees, and the annual output was over 17,500 tons of tin-plates. The principal markets were Germany and the US. The works were forced to close in 1957. The site is now used for housing.

== Operations ==
The boiler house, situated at the top end of the mills, near the smaller stack, contained one Lancashire boiler, of the Galloway type, made by Daniel Adamson and Co. This drove two duplicate horizontal compound engines. Coupled on to each of these were two mills. Eventually, the proprietors compounded both engines and added a mill to each. At the lower end of the works were two more Lancashire boilers of the same type, sizes, and make as that at the upper part. The mills throughout the works were two rolls high, and each had two pairs of standard housings. The annealing, pickling, cold rolls, tinning and assorting rooms, as well as the carpenters' and fitting shops, and the smithy, were situated on the higher level of the works. There were three reverberatory annealing furnaces, and two pickling machines. The tin-house contained fourteen tin-sets of the type known as the "Melingriffith Patent"; fourteen Richard Thomas and Company's cleaners, and four dusting-machines. The tin-house machinery was driven by a 25 hp three-phase electric motor. The fitting shop contained four lathes, one screw-cutting machine, and one drilling machine. The building which contained the carpenters' shop was used as a "company shop" where the workpeople obtained their supplies of food and clothing. One of the two locomotives was made by Andrew Barclay Sons & Co. of Kilmarnock.

== Band ==
The Melingriffith Brass Band of the works was one of the best known music ensembles in South Wales in the late 19th and early 20th century. It is also arguably Wales's oldest, originally established in 1798 as a Drum and Fife Band to "assist the recruitment of a Company of Volunteers to fight against the French, who were threatening to invade Britain." With the 13th Glamorgan Rifle Volunteers Corporation, in 1850 it became a full brass band and led by T.W. Booker and would practice in the New Houses, a row of workers cottages at the works. In the 1860s and 1870s the band was known as "Booker's Band" but it appears that the band was subject to splitting and by the 1880s and 1890s "The Volunteer Band", "The Temperance Band" and "The Drum and Fife Band" were known to exist until the Volunteer and Temperance bands merged to form "The Whitchurch Brass Band" as it became known in the early 20th century. In 1913, the Whitchurch Brass Band merged with the Melingriffith Cadet Corps. The band was led by Thomas James Powell from 1920 and in 1941 changed its name to the "Melingriffith Works Band". The headquarters were moved in 1937 from a small hall just above the works on Velindre Road to a building within the works between the River Taff and the Glamorganshire Canal. The band performed on Castle Street in June 1947 when the fifth Marquess of Bute ceded Cardiff Castle to the City of Cardiff.

Though the works closed in 1957, the band continued to function and became known as 'The Excelsior Ropes Works Band' in mid 1960s until 1992. Although the band almost parted in the 1980s due to lack of membership and interest, it has since seen a growth, and in 2004, the band won second place at the National Eisteddfod in Newport. A new band, Melingriffith Youth Band, was established in 2011. The flourishing organisation is now called the City of Cardiff (Melingriffith) Brass Band, with five different bands performing under this name: Melingriffith 1, the senior band recently competed at the 2018 UK National Championships at the Royal Albert Hall; Melingriffith 2 is the second competing band (in section 2/3); Melingriffith 3 is the youth band; Melingriffith 4 is the beginner's band; and Melingriffith Community Band for non-competing members.

== See also ==
- Treforest tinplate works
