= Melingriffith Brass Band =

Welsh brass band

- Origin: Whitchurch, Cardiff, Wales
- Genres: Brass band
- Years active: 1798–present

The Melingriffith Brass Band of the Melingriffith Tin Plate Works of Whitchurch, Cardiff, south Wales, is a brass band that was one of the best known music ensembles in South Wales in the late 19th and early 20th century. It is also arguably Wales's oldest, originally established in 1798 as a Drum and Fife Band to "assist the recruitment of a Company of Volunteers to fight against the French, who were threatening to invade Britain." With the 13th Glamorgan Rifle Volunteers Corporation, it became a full brass band in 1850.It was led by T.W. Booker and would practice in the New Houses, a row of workers cottages at the works. In the 1860s and 1870s the band was known as "Booker's Band" but it appears that the band was subject to splitting and by the 1880s and 1890s "The Volunteer Band", "The Temperance Band" and "The Drum and Fife Band" were known to exist until the Volunteer and Temperance bands merged to form "The Whitchurch Brass Band" as it became known in the early 20th century. In 1913, the Whitchurch Brass Band merged with the Melingriffith Cadet Corps. The band was led by Thomas James Powell from 1920 and in 1941 changed its name to the "Melingriffith Works Band". The headquarters were moved in 1937 from a small hall just above the works on Velindre Road to a building within the works between the River Taff and the Glamorganshire Canal. The band performed on Castle Street in June 1947 when the fifth Marquess of Bute ceded Cardiff Castle to the City of Cardiff.

Although the works closed in 1957, the band continued to function and became known as 'The Excelsior Ropes Works Band' in mid 1960s until 1973. Although the band almost parted in the 1980s due to lack of membership and interest. It has since seen a growth, and in 2004, the band won second place at the National Eisteddfod in Newport. A new band, Melingriffith Youth Band, was established in 2011.
