= Melingriffith Water Pump =

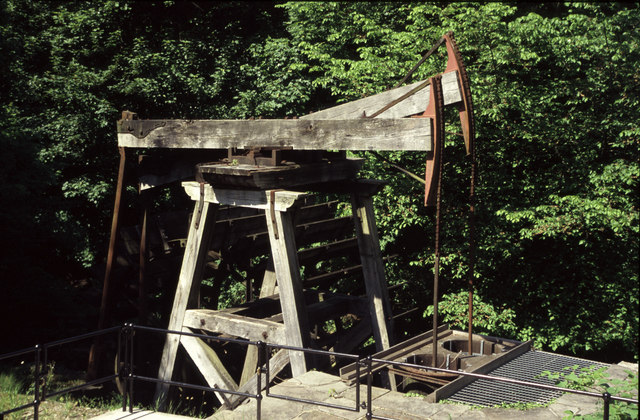
- Melingriffith water pump in 2004

- Location in Cardiff
- 51.5122°N 3.2378°W
- Type: water pump
- Location: Cardiff, Wales
- OS grid reference: ST 1420 7997

History
- Built: 1793
- Built for: Melingriffith Tinplate Works

Site notes
- Architect: Watkin George
- Restored: 1974–1989 and 2011
- Governing body: Cardiff City Council

Scheduled monument
- Official name: Melingriffith Water Pump
- Reference no.: GM312
- Community: Whitchurch

Melingriffith Water Pump is a water-driven water pump that was built by Watkin George, of Cyfartha, around 1793 to return precious water from the Melingriffith Tin Plate Works to the Glamorganshire Canal. The water pump is a scheduled monument and has been restored twice since it ceased operation in the 1940s. For many years it was believed to be designed by the canal engineer John Rennie.

== Background ==
When the Glamorganshire Canal was built it drew water from the same feed as the Melingriffith Tin Plate Works to operate the Melingriffith lock. The lock drew so much water that the works had to often cease operation in dry weather, despite a clause in the Glamorgan Canal Navigation Act requiring the company to protect the water supplies of local industries.

The ensuing legal battle led to an agreement to pump water from the tail race of the tin plate works to a height of 12 feet (3.7 m) back into the canal. The canal company installed the pump, and the tin plate works contributed to its maintenance.

== Operation ==
The pump is driven by an undershot paddle wheel. The wheel comprised three cast iron hoops mounted on a solid oak axle, with 30 blades mounted on the cast iron hoops. The wheel is 18 feet 6 inches (5.64 m) in diameter with a width of 12 feet 6 inches (3.81 m). The paddles are 22 inches (0.56 m) deep.

The paddle wheel is connected to two rocking beams of oak which are 22 feet (6.7 m) long by 1 foot 2 inches (0.36 m) by 1 foot 4 inches (0.41 m). The connecting rods, made of cast iron, are 18 feet 5 inches (5.61 m) long, with a cross section of 4 inches (0.10 m) by 5 inches (0.13 m). The rocking beams are supported on an oak frame of 1 foot (0.30 m) by 1 foot (0.30 m) timber.

The other ends of the two rocking beams are connected to the vertical pumping cylinders by a chain mechanism. The cylinders have a bore of 2 feet 8 inches (0.81 m) and a stroke of 5 feet (1.5 m). The pistons in each cylinder include triangular weighted flaps of iron with leather hinges.

In 1808 John Rennie and William Jessop were consulted about problems with the pump. They recommended a "fire engine" (a steam engine) but it appears that the tin plate works owners would not contribute to the costs.

The pump continued to operate continually until 1927, and probably after that until the canal effectively closed in 1942. The pump remained standing until restoration was started in 1974. Scrap merchants failed to dismantle the pump in the 1950s.

== Restoration ==
Melingriffith Water Pump was first restored between 1974–89 by the Inland Waterways Association and Oxford House (Risca) Industrial Archaeology Society, with cooperation from Cardiff City Council, and some timber components including the axle were replaced by steel.

The tinplate works were demolished in the 1980s and replaced by a housing estate. The Welsh Development Agency kept the feeder from the weir across the River Taff so the restored water pump could be operated. When the restoration was completed in 1989 the pump was put in the care of Cardiff City Council.

Further restoration work was carried out in 2009–11. Bats roosting in the rocker beams delayed the restoration but the pump ran again on 1 July 2010, now operated by electric power. The restoration work, costing £100,000 was funded by Cadw and Cardiff Council and was carried out by Penybryn Engineering with project management by Opus International Consultants. Although the pump was operated regularly for a few years, it has now fallen into disrepair again and since 2016 has not worked, due to a crack in the casting and the need to replace more of the timber spokes than was originally first thought.

== Conservation ==
The pump is a scheduled monument and the centrepiece of the Melingriffith Water Pump Conservation Area which was designated in 1975.

== See also ==
- Pont-y-Cafnau – an iron bridge designed by Watkin George
