= Glamorganshire Canal =

Former canal in Wales

Coordinates: 51°45′N 3°23′W

Glamorganshire Canal Camlas Morgannwg (Welsh)
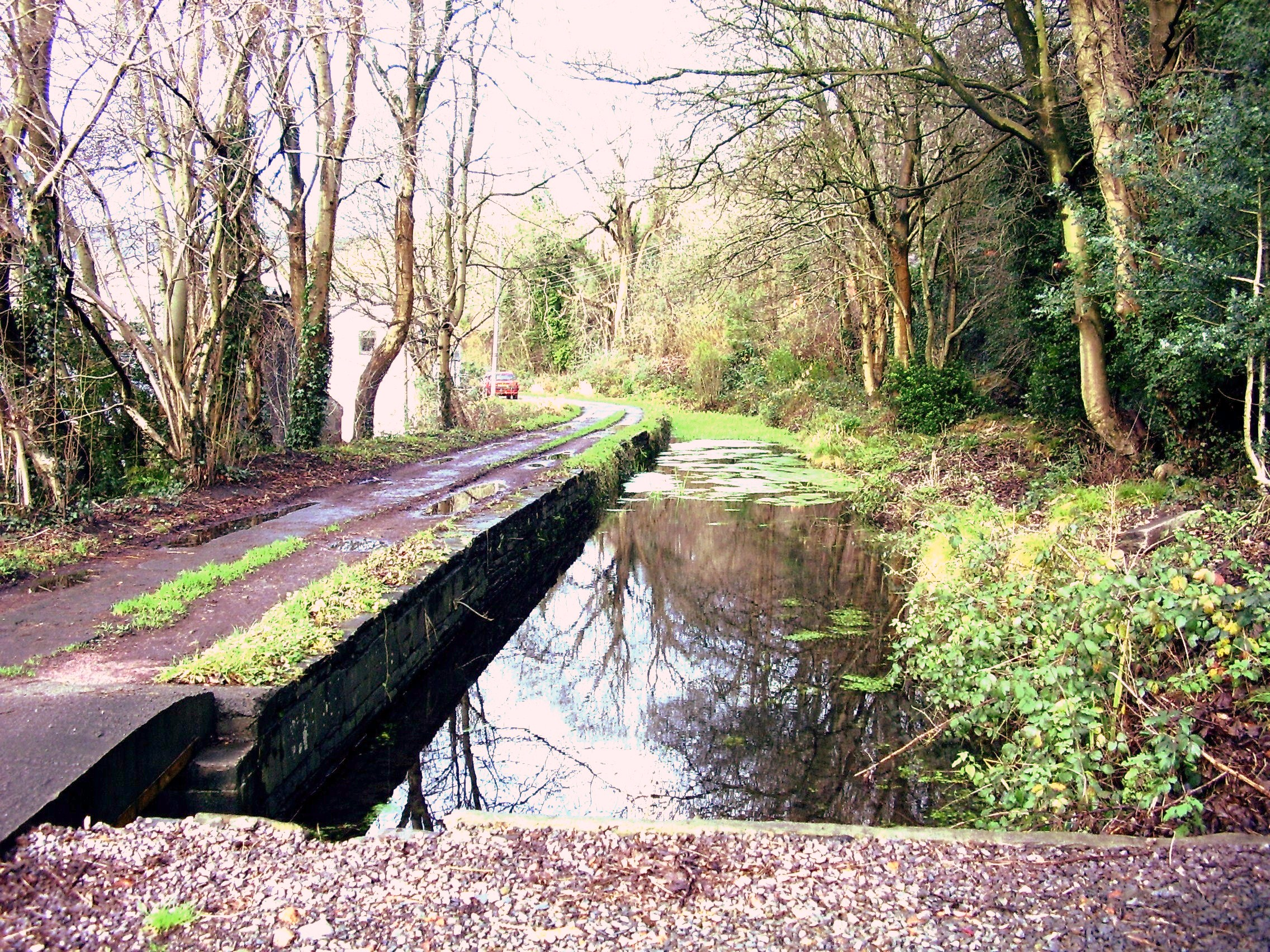
- The Glamorganshire Canal at Nightingales Bush, Pontypridd.
- Interactive map of Glamorganshire Canal; Camlas Morgannwg (Welsh)

Specifications
- Locks: 52
- Status: Mostly filled in; part under A470 road; part footpaths.

History
- Original owner: Glamorganshire Canal Navigation Co
- Principal engineer: Thomas Dadford
- Other engineer: Thomas Sheasby
- Date of act: 1790
- Date completed: 1794
- Date closed: 1898, 1915, 1942, 1951

Geography
- Start point: Merthyr Tydfil
- End point: Cardiff Docks
- Branch: Aberdare Canal

The Glamorganshire Canal (Welsh: Camlas Morgannwg) in South Wales, UK, was begun in 1790. It ran along the valley of the River Taff from Merthyr Tydfil to the Bristol Channel at Cardiff. The final section of canal was closed in 1951.

== History ==
Glamorganshire Canal Act 1790
- Act of Parliament
- Parliament of Great Britain
- Long title: An Act for making and maintaining a Navigable Canal from Merthyr Tidvile, to and through a Place called The Bank, near the Town of Cardiff, in the County of Glamorgan.
- Citation: 30 Geo. 3. c. 82
- Territorial extent: Great Britain

Dates
- Royal assent: 9 June 1790
- Commencement: 21 January 1790 (Note: Start of session.)
- Repealed: 2 June 1987
Other legislation
Repealed by	Mid Glamorgan County Council Act 1987

Status: Repealed

Text of statute as originally enacted

Construction started in 1790; being watched over by the wealthy ironmasters of Merthyr Tydfil, including Richard Crawshay of the Cyfarthfa Ironworks, the canal was thought up as a solution to the issue of transporting the goods (iron ore, coal and limestone) from the valleys to Cardiff, where they would be shipped around the world. Thomas Dadford was hired to inspect and plan a route for the canal and, with support from Lord Cardiff, the canal was authorised by an act of Parliament, the Glamorganshire Canal Act 1790 (30 Geo. 3. c. 82) on 9 June 1790.

Almost £90,000 was raised in preparation of constructing the canal and would be linked to any works within four miles of the canal, through branch canals and linking railways. However, during the few miles approaching Cardiff, the canal suffered from severe water shortages, resulting in goods not arriving in Cardiff on time. To solve this problem, the Melingriffith Water Pump was installed, with the main purpose being to provide water to the canal from the River Taff. Located not far from the Melingriffith Tinplate works located directly between the River Taff and the Glamorganshire Canal, it was built in 1807, but the origins of the water pump are disputed; historians believe it was designed by either Watkin George of Cyfarthfa Ironworks (1793), or John Rennie (1795).

=== Construction ===
The Company of Proprietors of the Glamorganshire Canal Navigation was authorised to raise £60,000 in capital to build the main canal, with a further £30,000 if necessary, together with branch canals as required, and feeder railways linking the canal to any works within 4 miles (6 km) of its course. These railways were deemed to be part of the canal itself, and so land for their routes could be obtained by compulsory purchase if required. Construction began in August 1790, when Thomas Dadford, a pupil of the canal engineer James Brindley, arrived on site, with Thomas Sheasby, his son Thomas Dadford, Jr., and a team of workmen. Construction started from the Merthyr Tydfil end. An extension from Merthyr to Crawshay's Cyfarthfa Ironworks was also built, although payment for it resulted in a dispute which was eventually resolved by arbitration. A plan to build a branch to the Dowlais and Penydarren Ironworks, which would have risen 411 feet (125 m) in only 1.75 miles (2.82 km) was dropped, and was replaced by two tramroads, one from each works.

The Merthyr to Newbridge (later renamed Pontypridd) section was completed by June 1792, and the rest of the canal was progressively opened to Pwllywhyad (Treforest) in January 1793 and Taff's Well by June 1793. By this time the project was well over budget, and although the final section to Cardiff was opened on 10 February 1794, it was not well constructed, and there were several stoppages for repairs during 1794. The canal breached in December, but Dadford refused to start repairs without payment, despite the terms of his contract, and promptly dismissed his workforce and walked away from the job. The canal company attempted to recover £17,000 from the Dadfords, and had them arrested, but two independent surveyors employed by the engineer Robert Whitworth judged largely in the Dadfords' favour, and only £1,512 was refunded.

The canal followed the Queen Street Tunnel in central Cardiff, which crossed Queen Street opposite The Friary, and under what is now the St David's shopping centre. The tunnel was 105 metres (115 yd) long and 3.89 metres (12 ft 9 in) wide. It had a towpath for 21 metres (69 ft) long and had chains for the boatmen to pull by hand for the remainder of the tunnel.

The canal was around 25 miles (40 km) long with a drop of around 542 feet (165 m), requiring 50 locks. It clung to the western side of the valley down to Navigation (now called Abercynon) where it crossed the River Taff on an aqueduct, to cling to the eastern side for most of its route to Cardiff. A second act of Parliament, the Glamorganshire Canal Act 1796 (36 Geo. 3. c. 69), was obtained on 26 April 1796, which enabled the canal to be extended by half a mile (0.8 km), ending in a sea lock in Cardiff docks. This was opened in June 1798 when the event was celebrated by a naval procession and the firing of ships' guns The total cost of the canal was £103,600, which included the costs of buying the land, as well as the contract with the Dadfords.

Although the Dadfords left the canal under a shadow, their work was vindicated by Whitworth, and they went on to build other canals in neighbouring valleys, while their achievement was summed up by John Bird in 1796: "The canal is brought through mountainous scenery with wonderful ingenuity".

=== Operation ===
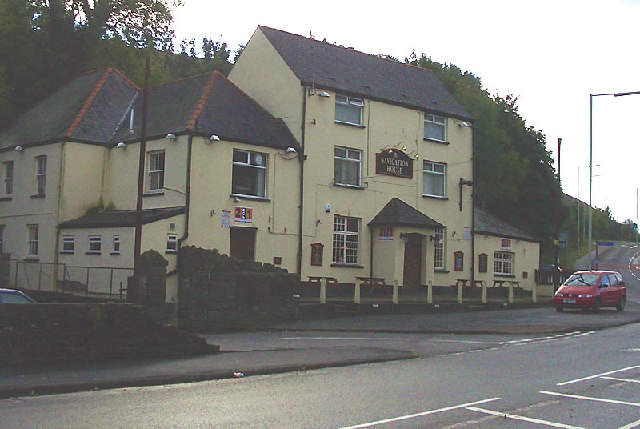
Navigation House at Abercynon was built in 1792 and was the headquarters of the Canal Company. It is now a pub.

Richard Crawshay was the principal shareholder in the canal company, and seems to have used his influence to his own advantage, treating the canal as his own. His attempts to squeeze the profits of the other ironmasters led to them proposing a Tramroad from Merthyr to Cardiff, to compete with the canal. Crawshay resisted this, and the canal tolls were reduced somewhat, but the ironmasters on the east side of the Taff Valley soon built the Merthyr Tramroad, which opened in 1802 and linked their iron works to the canal at Abercynon, near the River Taff aqueduct.

Water for the top of the canal was obtained from the tail races from Cyfarthfa ironworks, which had previously been fed back into the River Taff, so that it could be reused by the Plymouth ironworks. In order to safeguard this supply, all water discharged from the third lock was supposed to be fed into the Plymouth feeder, rather than the canal below it. This was a source of dispute for some years, with legal action instituted by both sides and the occasional bout of vandalism to ensure water actually flowed to the Plymouth works. The situation was eased with the opening of the Merthyr Tramroad, as there was less traffic on the upper section, and therefore less water used by the locks.

The canal was profitable for many years. Dividends were limited to eight per cent by the authorising act of Parliament, and so between 1804 and 1828 the profits were used to give refunds to the traders, periods when no tolls were charged, and others when they were reduced to one quarter of the rate fixed by the act. From 1841 railways began to encroach onto the canal's territory, when the Taff Vale Railway opened to Merthyr. The canal held its own for another twenty years, but in the 1870s the ironworks started to close, while some moved to the manufacture of steel.

The canal passed over the Bute Docks Feeder with a small aqueduct built in the late 1830s, at the north-east corner of Cardiff Castle. The feeder fed the Bute Docks, having extracted water from Blackweir on the River Taff. There was an overflow from the canal into the feeder.

1876 was the first year when the canal company was unable to pay the full eight per cent dividend, and profits fell rapidly after that. The canal was sold to the Marquess of Bute in 1885, who made some improvements at the Cardiff end, but six railway companies were serving Merthyr by 1886, all competing for traffic. The upper sections, particularly the 4-mile (6 km) pound at Aberfan, was suffering from severe subsidence as a result of the coal mining. An inspection was carried out, and the canal was closed from Merthyr to Abercynon on 6 December 1898, to safeguard the village of Aberfan.

=== Decline and closure ===
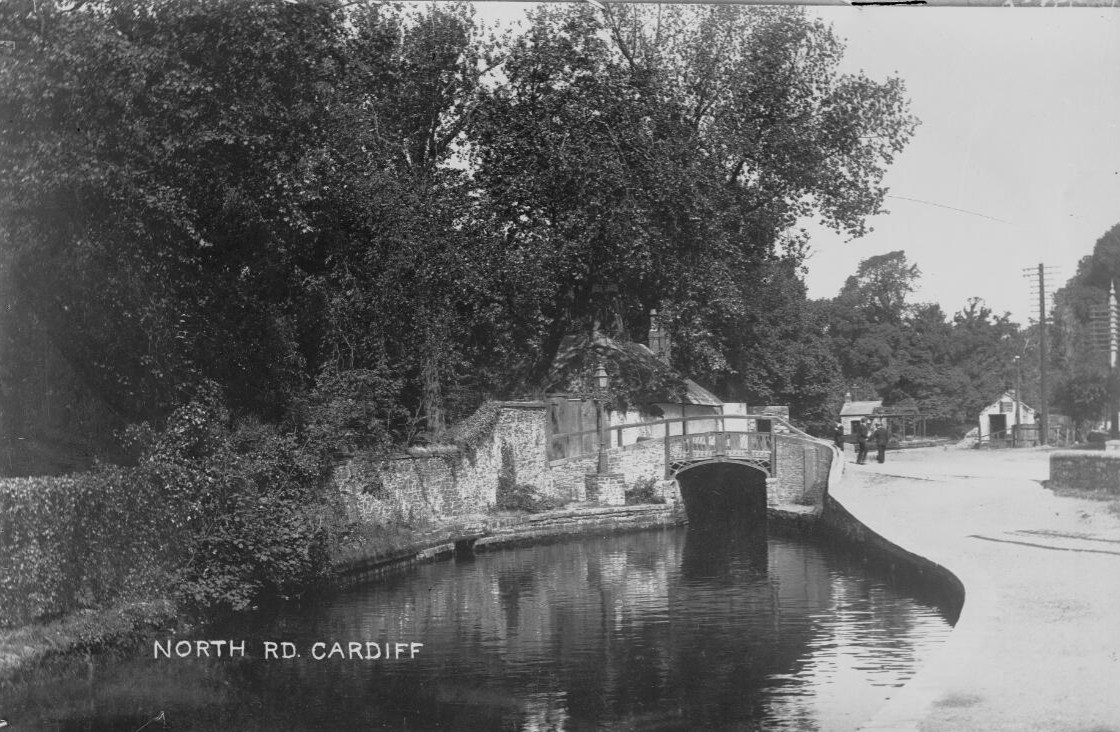
North Road Lock in Cardiff (c. 1905)

The takeover of the canal by the Marquess of Bute was a little too late to have any great effect. Improvements at Cardiff involved the construction of a new lock, Number 51, which raised the water level between there and Crockherbtown lock, so that the junction canal and the East and West Bute docks were all on the same level. The new lock was not included in the 1888 returns to the Board of Trade, and so must have been built after that date. Traffic on the rest of the canal continued to decline, and when a breach occurred at Cilfynydd in 1915, the company decided not to invest in its repair, but instead built a wooden flume around the breach, so that water from the Elen Deg feeder could still reach the rest of the canal. A further breach occurred on 25 May 1942, near Nantgarw and, although engineers examined the problem, no work was carried out.

Cardiff Corporation moved quickly, and agreed to buy the canal for £44,000. This proposal was enshrined in the Cardiff Corporation Act 1943 (6 & 7 Geo. 6. c. xvi) of August 1943, allowing them to take control of the canal on 1 January 1944, and immediately declare it closed, most business having effectively ceased in 1942. However, section 27 of that act prevented them from closing the final mile above the sea lock, while it was used by sand traders. An attempt to evict the sand traders failed when the Ministry of War Transport invoked section 27 and ruled that the sea lock pound must be kept navigable until six months after the present emergency ended. The war emergency was not declared to have ended until 8 October 1950.

Meanwhile, the two sand and gravel firms continued to use the sea lock and the pound to carry on their business. However, the end came on the night of 5 December 1951, when a steam suction dredger, called Catherine Ethel and weighing 154 tons, crashed into the inner lock gates. The gates collapsed, and all of the water in the mile-long section (1.6 km) emptied into the estuary. The gates were never repaired and the difficult job of closing the canal was solved overnight for the Cardiff Corporation.

== Today ==
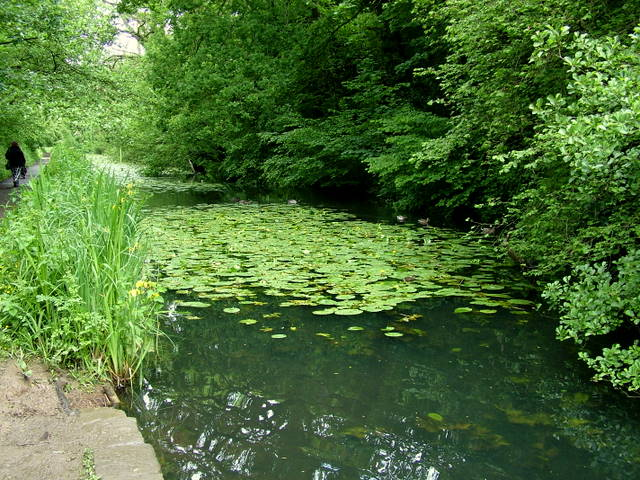
This section of disused canal near Forest Farm is now a nature reserve. It is in close proximity to the M4 motorway.

Today, limited traces of the canal remain, about one half being covered by the A470 Cardiff to Merthyr Tydfil trunk road, which was constructed in the 1970s. Much of the Taff Trail between Abercynon and Merthyr Tydfil follows the line of the canal. The section from Tongwynlais to the Melingriffith Tin Plate Works at Whitchurch has been retained in water and was used for fishing, but is now the Glamorganshire Canal local nature reserve. In addition, there are a few bridges and locks which have not been destroyed. There are also short stretches in water at Nightingales Bush and at Locks 31 and 32 in Pontypridd and there are plans for restoration here.

A boat weighing machine, one of only four known to have existed on British canals, was originally installed at Tongwynlais and was later moved to North Road, Cardiff. The machine was presented to the British Transport Commission in 1955 and was re-erected at the Stoke Bruerne Canal Museum in Northamptonshire in 1964. In 2013 it was moved to the National Waterfront Museum in Swansea.

== See also ==
- Canals of Great Britain
- History of the British canal system

== Bibliography ==
- Cumberlidge, Jane (1998). Inland Waterways of Great Britain. Imray Laurie Norie and Wilson. ISBN 0-85288-355-2.
- Davies, Walter (1815). General View of the Agriculture and Domestic Economy of South Wales. (Internet Archive).
- Jardine, R. J.; et al. (March 2004). Advances in Geotechnical Engineering: The Skempton Conference. Thomas Telford. ISBN 0-7277-3264-1.
- Priestley, Joseph (1831). "Historical Account of the Navigable Rivers, Canals, and Railways of Great Britain". Archived from the original on 4 March 2016.
- Rowson, Stephen; Wright, Ian L. (2001). The Glamorganshire and Aberdare Canals (Volume 1). Lydney: Black Dwarf Publications. ISBN 0-9533028-9-X.
- Rowson, Stephen; Wright, Ian L. (2004). The Glamorganshire and Aberdare Canals (Volume 2). Lydney: Black Dwarf Publications. ISBN 1-903599-12-1.
