= Whitchurch Library =

Grade II listed library in Whitchurch, Cardiff, Wales

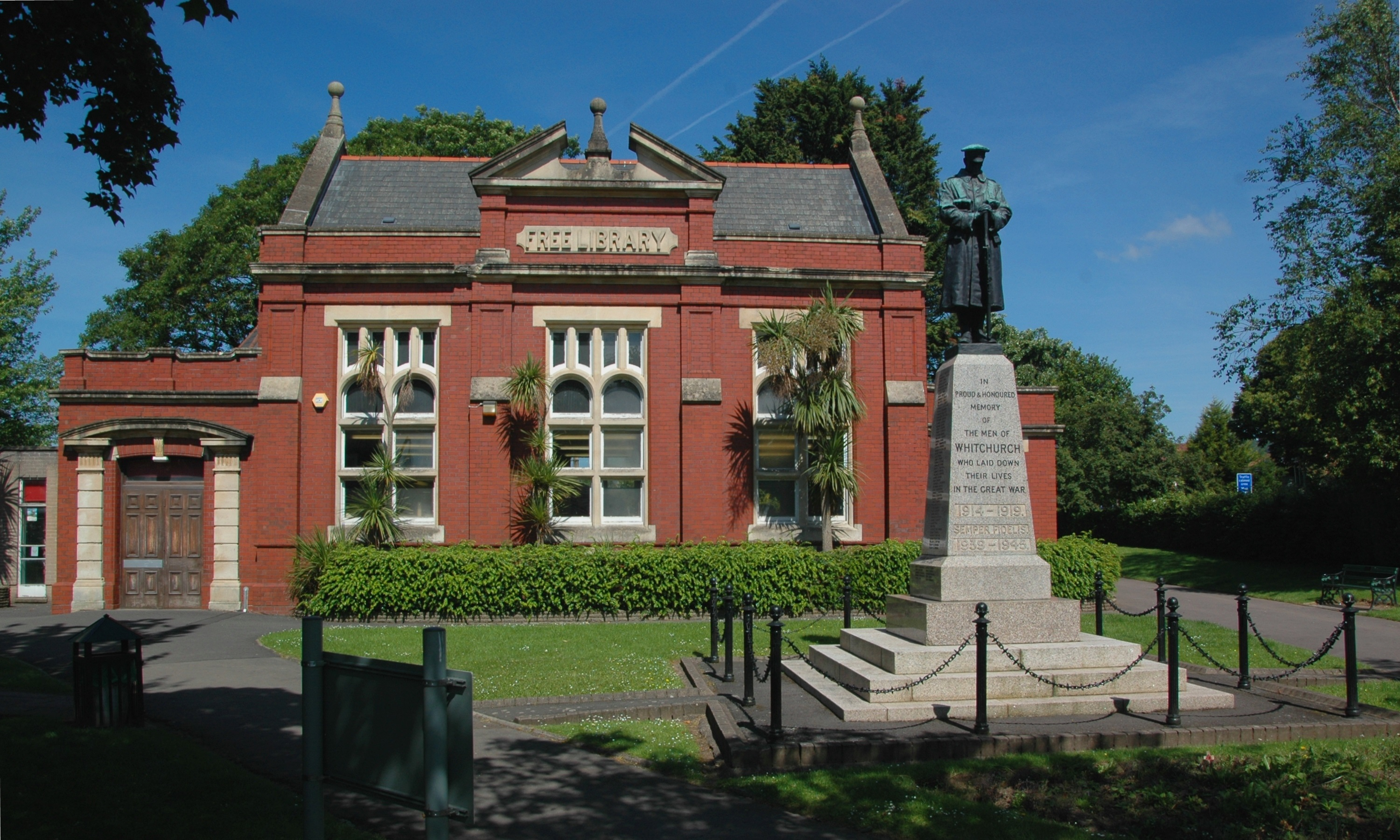
- The library and war memorial

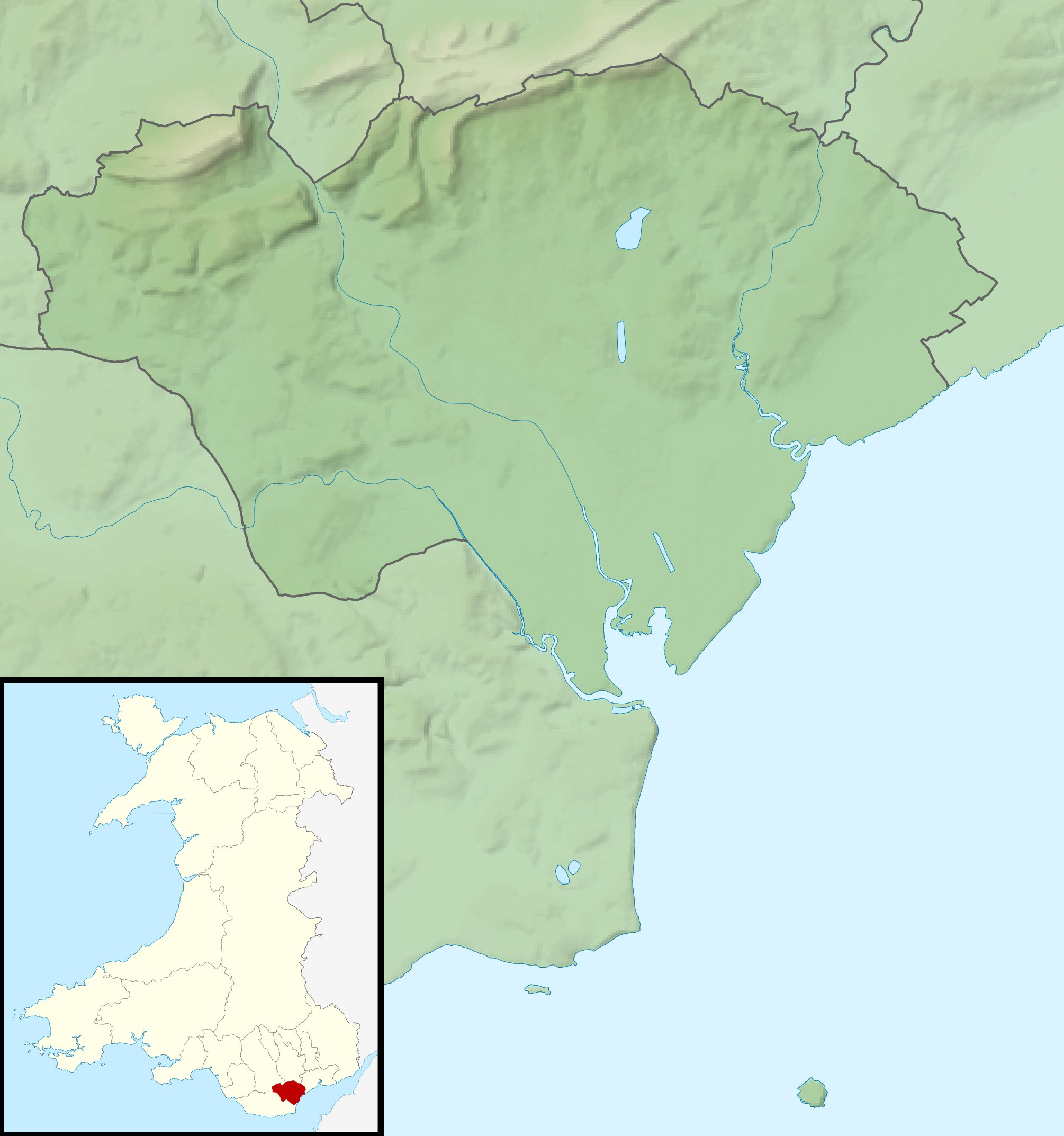
- Location within Cardiff
- 51.516°N 3.2254°W
- Type: Library
- Location: Whitchurch, Cardiff, Wales

History
- Built: 1904 with later additions

Site notes
- Architect(s): R & S Williams of Cardiff
- Architectural style: Edwardian Revival
- Owner: Cardiff City Council

Listed Building – Grade II
- Official name: Whitchurch Free Library
- Designated: 31 May 2002
- Reference no.: 26715

Listed Building – Grade II
- Official name: Whitchurch War Memorial
- Designated: 31 May 2002
- Reference no.: 26714

Whitchurch Library serves the suburb of Whitchurch, Cardiff, Wales as a library and community hub. It stands in a small park at the junction of Penlline Road, Park Road and Velindre Road in the north of the city. The library opened as a Carnegie library in 1904. In front of the library stands the Whitchurch War Memorial which commemorates the men of the community who died in the First and Second World Wars. Both the library and the memorial are Grade II listed buildings.

== History ==
The site of Whitchurch Library and the park in which it stands, were obtained by the then Whitchurch Parish Council in 1899. The land was gifted by the Corporation of Cardiff in return for the parish council’s cooperation in the establishment of Whitchurch Hospital. In the same year the council made a funding application to the Carnegie Foundation for the establishment of a Carnegie library, but approval, and money, were not received until the early 20th century. The library, designed by the Cardiff-based architectural firm R & S Williams and costing £2000, opened in 1904.

The library operates a book loan service and as a community hub.

== Architecture and description ==
The library is built of red brick with Bath stone ashlar dressings. Cadw describes the architectural style as "Flemish Baroque". John Newman considered it "thumpingly Jacobean". The interior has been subject to reconfiguration in the early 21st century as part of its conversion to a community and well-being hub, and Cadw considers it is now "featureless".

Both the library and the memorial are Grade II listed buildings.

== Whitchurch War Memorial ==
The war memorial stands directly in front of the library. It was constructed circa 1923 and consists of an obelisk on a stepped plinth, surmounted by a bronze effigy of a soldier. It was dedicated on 8 December 1923, with an unveiling ceremony led by the Earl of Plymouth, to commemorate the dead of Whitchurch resulting from the First World War and was rededicated on 26 September 1948 to commemorate the dead of the Second. The names of 280 men are inscribed on the sides of the monument. (Note: Among those commemorated on the memorial is Captain Johnny Williams, who played rugby union for Wales between 1906 and 1911, becoming the team’s highest point scorer. He died at Mametz Wood in 1916 and is buried in France.) The memorial was restored in the early 21st century.

== Sources ==
- Newman, John (1995). Glamorgan. The Buildings of Wales. London, UK: Penguin. ISBN 978-0-140-71056-4. Archived from the original on 27 July 2023.
