= Pont-y-Cafnau =

Bridge in Wales

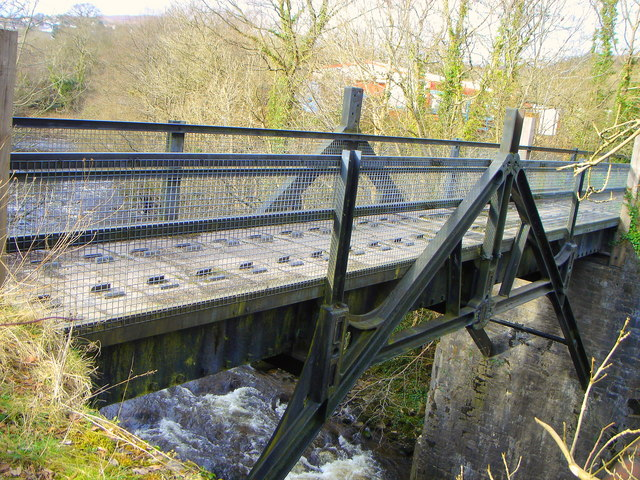
- Pont-y-Cafnau
- Coordinates: 51°45′17″N 3°23′44″W
- Carries: (originally) Gurnos Tramway, aqueduct; (today) pedestrians
- Crosses: River Taff
- Locale: Cyfarthfa Ironworks, Merthyr Tydfil

Characteristics
- Design: King post truss
- Material: Cast iron
- Total length: 14.2 metres (47 ft)

History
- Designer: Watkin George
- Constructed by: Cyfarthfa Ironworks
- Construction end: January–June, 1793

Location
- Interactive map of Pont-y-Cafnau

The Pont-y-Cafnau (Welsh for 'bridge of troughs'; sometimes written Pont y Cafnau or Pontycafnau), is a 14.2-metre (47 ft) long iron truss bridge over the River Taff in Merthyr Tydfil, Wales. The bridge was designed by Watkin George and built in 1793 for his employer, the Cyfarthfa Ironworks, to support both a tramway and an aqueduct to carry limestone and water into the works. A Grade II* listed building and Scheduled Ancient Monument, the Pont-y-Cafnau is the world's earliest surviving iron railway bridge.

== History ==
The Cyfarthfa Ironworks were founded in 1765 and grew to the world's largest ironworks by the early 19th century. In 1771, the works obtained the right to quarry limestone from the Gurnos Quarry for use in the works' blast furnaces, and a 4 ft (1,219 mm) gauge tramway was built between 1792 and 1793 to carry the limestone from the quarry into the plant. Pont-y-Cafnau is situated shortly downstream of the confluence of the Taff Fawr and the Taff Fechan to form the Taff. A weir had previously been built upstream of the plant on each river, and leats were built to convey water into the works. The leat from the Taff Fawr was conveyed in a cast-iron elevated aqueduct which ran along the north bank and crossed the Taff Fechan before crossing the Taff at Pont-y-Cafnau and entering the works to power a 50-foot cast iron water wheel known as Aeolus. The leat from Taff Fechan was at ground level and again crossed the Taff at Pont-y-Cafnau. This supplied water to the Cyfarthfa brick works. The three levels of Pont-y-Cafnau thus carried the elevated Taff Fawr leat, the tramway and Taff Fechan leat across the Taff River. The bridge was built between January and June 1793, replacing a previous wooden structure, and is the world's oldest known iron railway bridge. The elevated trough carrying the Taff Fawr leat was removed by 1850, having been replaced by a leat along the south bank of that river.

== Design ==
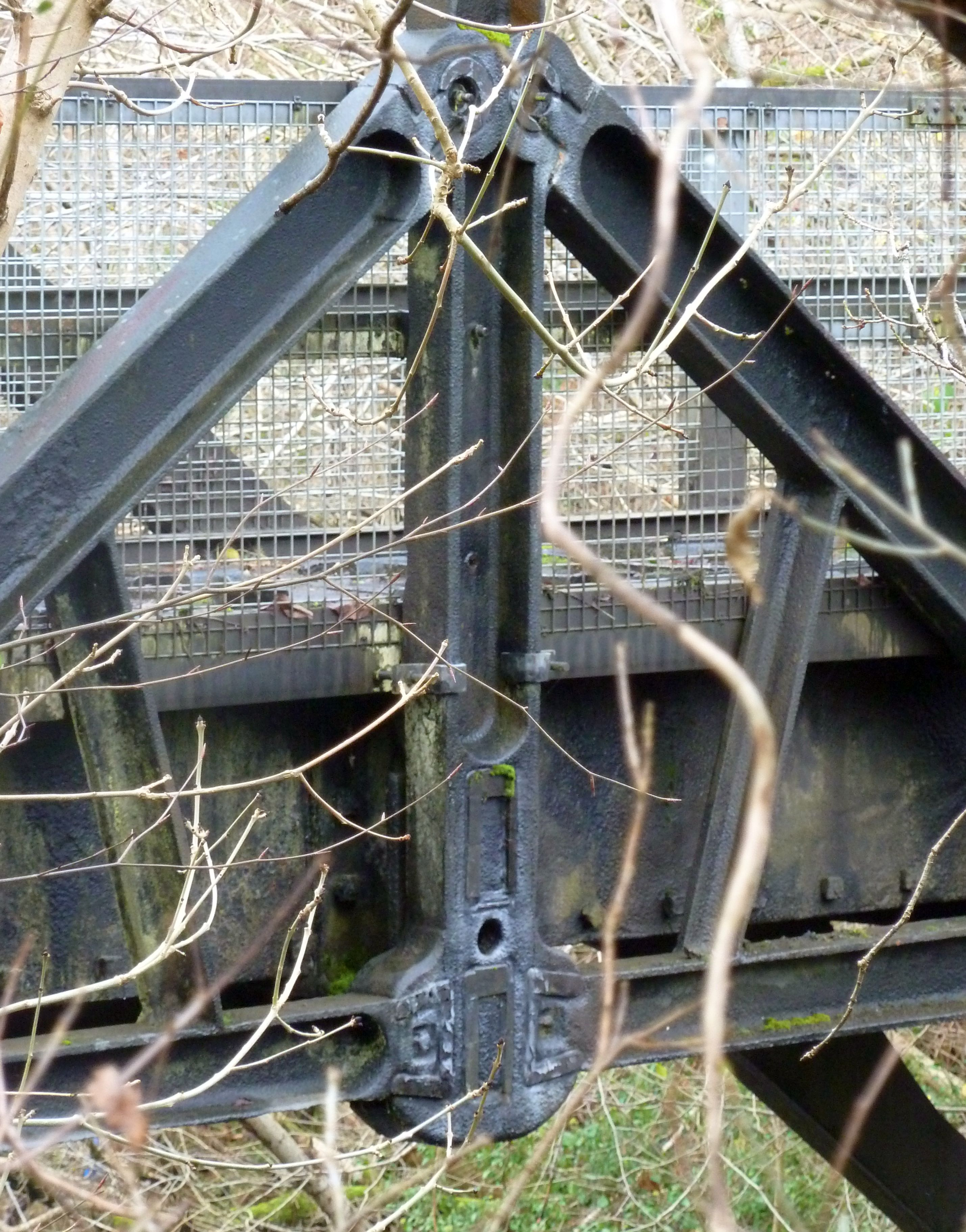
Pont-y-Cafnau, showing detail of joints

The present bridge was designed by Watkin George. George had been trained as a carpenter, but in 1792 became the chief engineer of the ironworks and a partner in the business. The bridge is composed of two cast iron A-frame trusses supporting a rectangular 2-foot by 6-foot-2-inch cast iron trough. This lower trough carried the Taff Fechan leat and acts as a girder supporting the plates acting as the railway sleepers, into which the rail chairs are integrally cast. Wooden uprights were attached to the iron risers that passed through the apex of each of the A-frames and these supported the upper trough carrying the Taff Fawr leat. Reflecting its designer's roots in carpentry, the members composing the trusses are joined by dovetail and mortise and tenon joints commonly used in wooden structures.

== Heritage ==
On 22 August 1975, the bridge was listed as a Grade II* listed building (reference number 11408). It is also listed as a Scheduled Ancient Monument (reference number GM424). It has been refurbished by the local authority and is used as a footbridge.

== See also ==
- Gaunless Bridge, an iron railway bridge, built by Stephenson in 1823, and the first iron bridge to be built for a railway, rather than a tramway.
- Iron Tram Bridge, Robertstown
- Old Iron Bridge, Merthyr Tydfil
- List of bridges in Wales
