= Ynysgau Chapel, Merthyr Tydfil =

Coordinates: 51°44′47″N 3°22′51″W

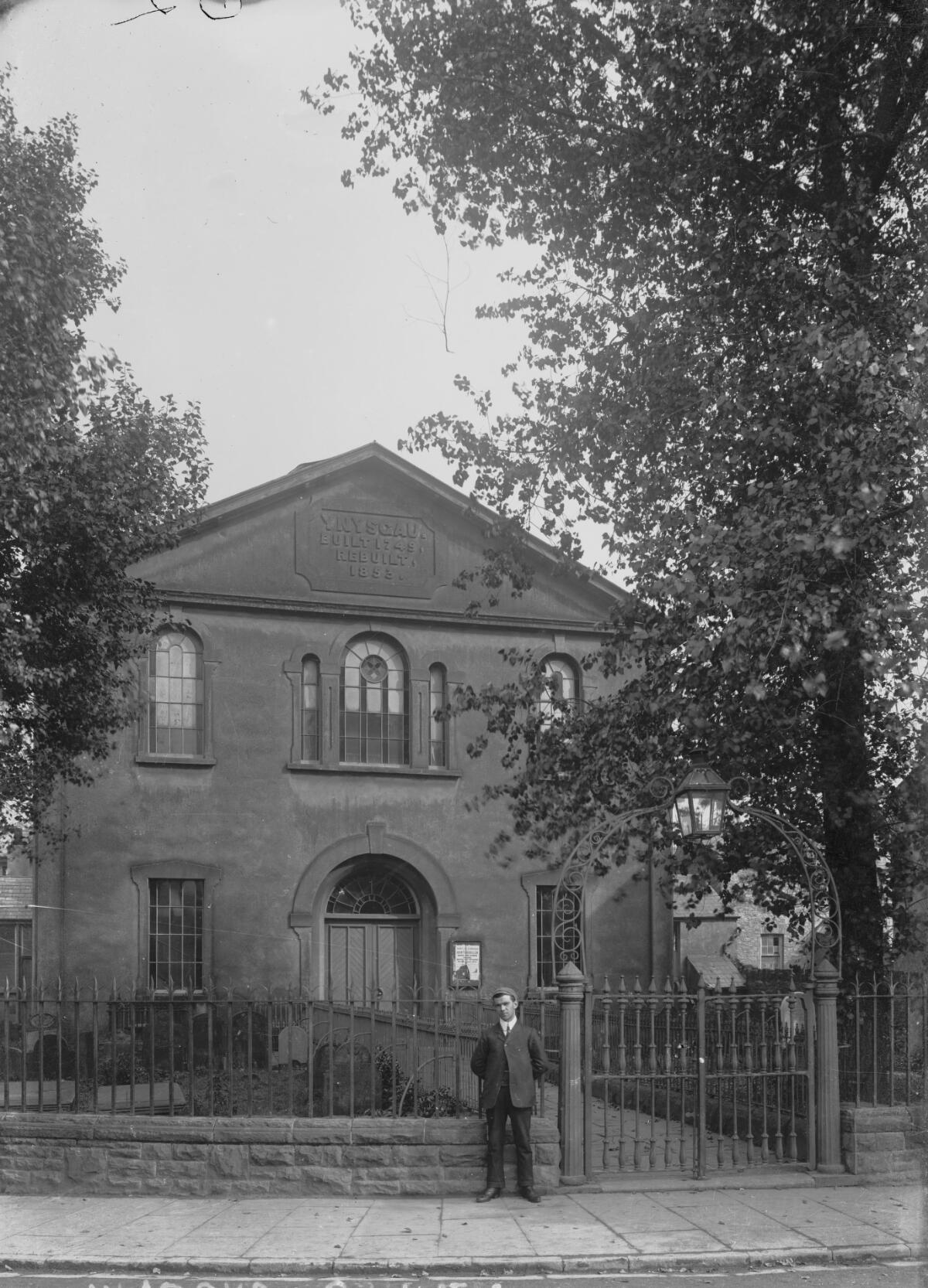
- Photograph from the Martin Ridley Collection, which documents the towns and villages of South Wales c.1900-1910
- Ynysgau Chapel, Merthyr Tydfil
- Country: Wales
- Denomination: Independent (Congregationalist)

History
- Founded: 1749; 277 years ago

Architecture
- Architectural type: Chapel
- Style: mid 19th century
- Completed: 1854; 172 years ago
- Closed: 1967; 59 years ago

Ynysgau Chapel was one of the earliest chapels in Merthyr Tydfil. The cause dated back to 1749 and services were held in the Welsh language. The chapel was demolished in 1967 as part of the Merthyr Town Improvement Scheme.

== Early history ==
The original cause at Ynysgau was established by various ‘Dissenters’ from the Church of England. It was acquired by the Independents (Congregationalists) by the early nineteenth century.

A new chapel was built in the 1850s and opened on Easter Sunday, 1854. A contemporary account described the new building as a "new structure of much architectural beauty, decorated with coloured glass windows." This was the final building to house the chapel.

Facing the chapel was the Old Iron Bridge of 1800, and the later Ynsgau Bridge of 1880. These were both demolished in 1963, as part of the same river and road improvement works which saw the chapel demolished.

== Sources ==
- Rees, Thomas; Thomas, John (1871). Hanes Eglwysi Annibynnol Cymru. Vol. 2.
