= Watkin George =

Welsh carpenter, engineer and ironmaster

Watkin George (1759-1822) was an carpenter, engineer and ironmaster from Trevethin in Monmouthshire. He rose from humble beginnings as a carpenter to have a major influence on ironworks at Cyfartha and Pontypool and is responsible for the design of early cast-iron bridges.

== Early life ==
Little is known about George's early life except that he was born in Trevethin around 1759 and that his father, who was also called Watkin George, died in 1787.

== Career ==
Again, little is known about George's early career but from about 1790 to 1794 he was possibly working on iron girder bridges over the Glamorganshire Canal. He was made a partner in Cyfartha ironworks in 1792 by the owner Richard Crawshay. The works expanded over the next few years, developing Henry Cort's puddling process, to become the largest ironworks in the world by 1806.

During this period Watkin George also constructed or designed Pont-y-Cafnau (1792-93 - an iron tramway bridge and aqueduct), Gwynne water aqueduct (1793-96 - a timber trestle structure 185m long, part of which ran over Pont-y-Cafnau), Melingriffith water pump (Note: Until recently John Rennie was assumed to be the designer of the waterwheel. Although Rennie was consulted on the waterwheel there is little evidence that Rennie's advice was heeded and the design is that of Watkin George.) (1793-1795), Aeolus waterwheel (1793-97 - a 50 ft diameter cast iron waterwheel), the Merthyr Bridge (1799-1800 - a single shallow arch of cast iron), and Ynysfach Ironworks (1801 - the two blast furnaces bore his initials).

Around 1805 Watkin George left Cyfartha to become a partner at Pontypool Ironworks where he undertook a number of changes including the demolition of a wire works at Pontymoile, a new tinplate works and waterwheel at Pontymoile and two tinplate works at Lower Mill, near Pontymoile. After George left Cyfartha he was described later (1807) as having ..."lately quitted the concern with from thirty to forty thousand pounds in his pocket. This is one among the most remarkable instances of wealth acquired by the untutored ingenuity of the natural faculties." The partnership with Capel Hanbury Leigh at Pontypool proved successful and after the first two years George received £8,300 in profits.

In 1811 George submitted plans for a bridge at Chepstow. The bridge was eventually built to a design by John Rastrick in 1816.

== Family life ==
On 20 September 1789 George married Anne Jenkins (1760-1845, also from Trevethin) at Llanhilleth. They had two or three children, Hannah (1793) Anne (1794) and Watkin (1795). Watkin George died on 10 August 1822 and is buried at St Cadoc's Church, Trevethin.

== Legacy ==
Pont-y-Cafnau and Melingriffith Water Pump both survive and are scheduled monuments (Pont-y-Cafnau is also a Grade II* listed building). The Iron Bridge at Merthyr was dismantled in 1963. The remaining parts are stored at Cyfarthfa Castle.
