= Iron Tram Bridge, Robertstown =

Iron Tram Bridge, Robertson
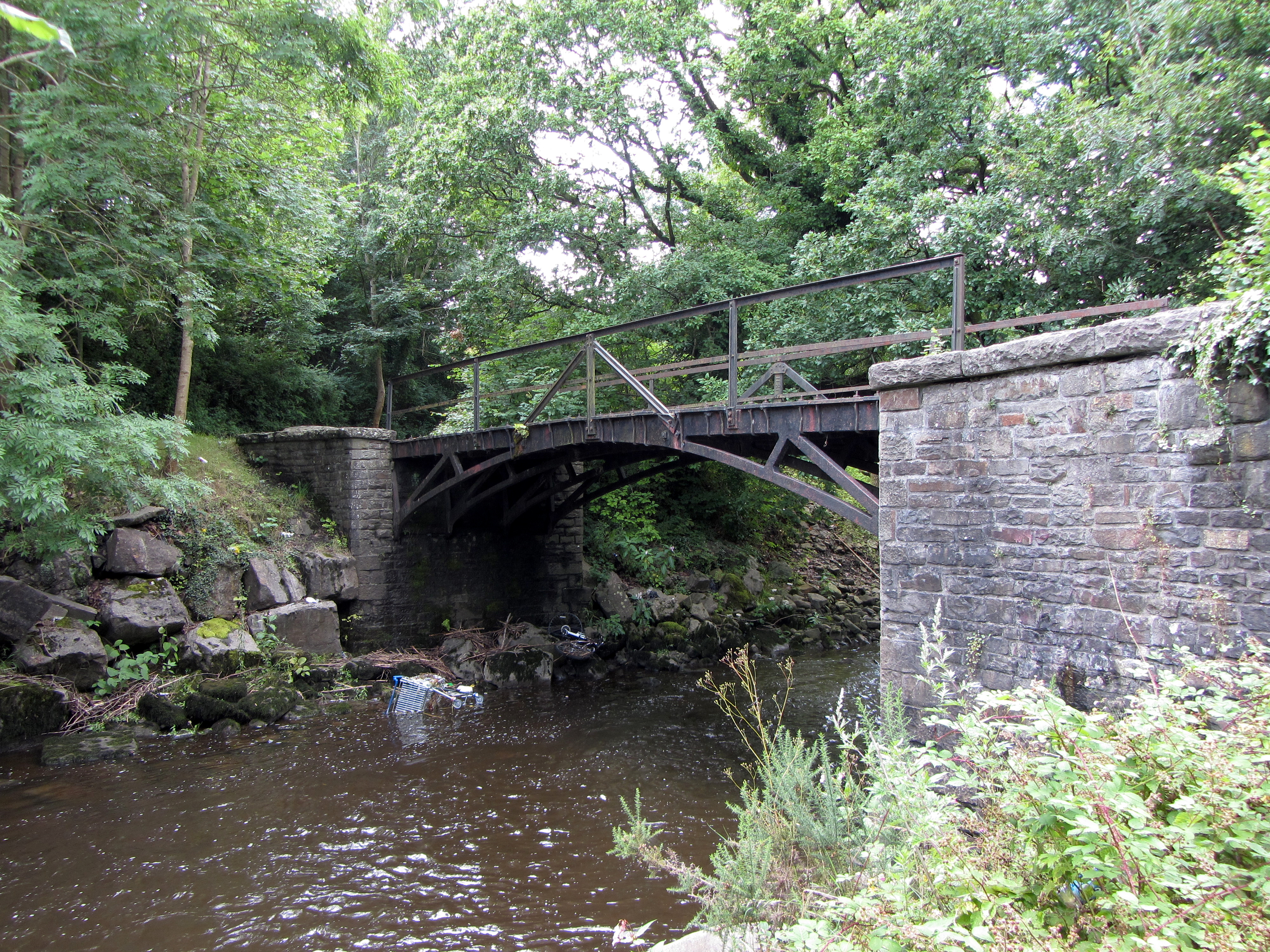

- Location within Rhondda Cynon Taf
- 51.7225°N 3.4527°W
- Type: Bridge
- Location: Rhondda Cynon Taf, Wales
- OS grid reference: SN 997 036

History
- Built: 1811

Scheduled monument
- Official name: Iron Tram Bridge, Robertson
- Designated: 16 November 1962
- Reference no.: GM347
- Community: Aberdare

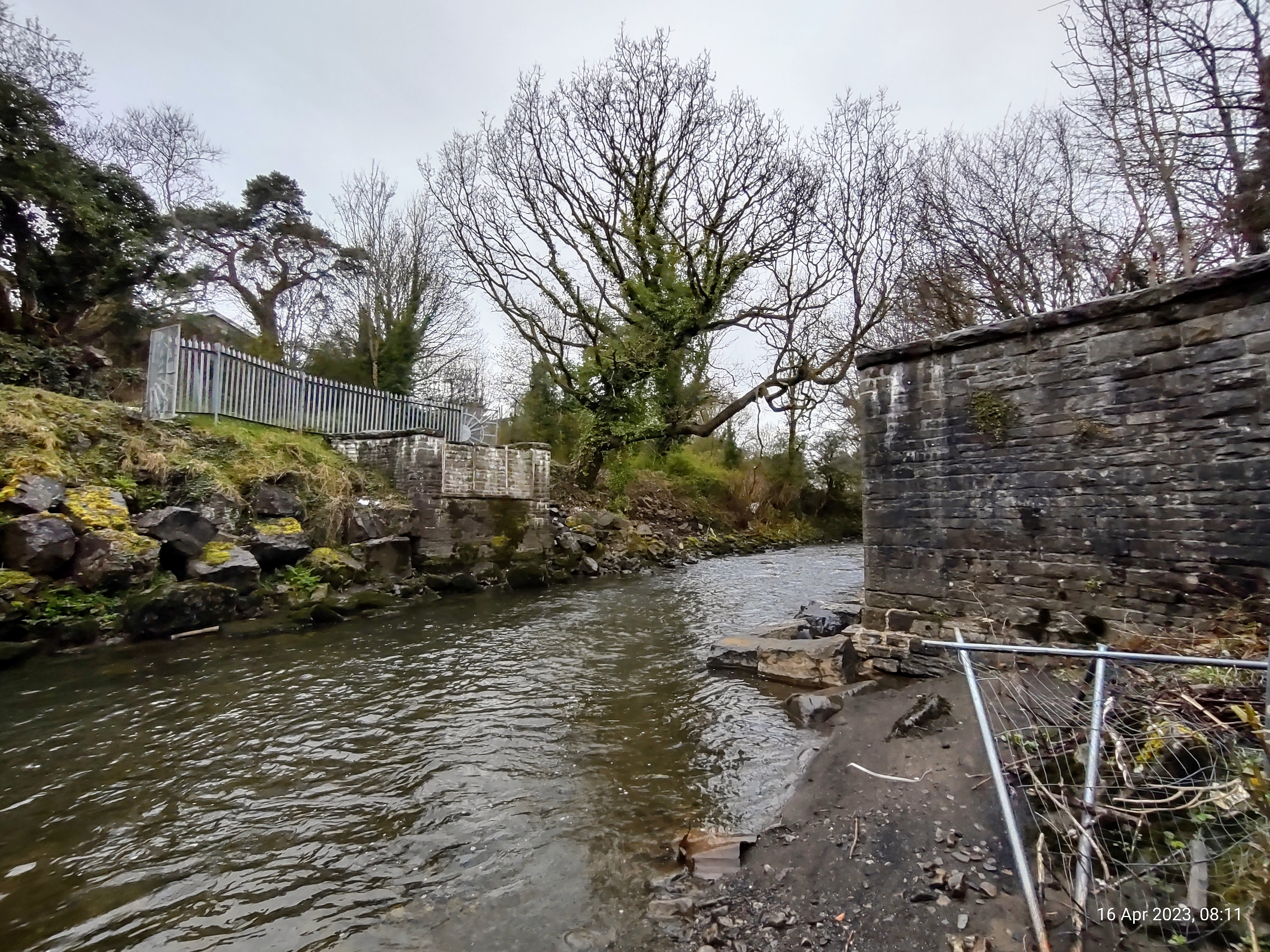
Remains of the bridge

The Iron Tram Bridge, Robertstown is an early example of a "railway" bridge. It crosses the River Cynon between Trecynon and Robertstown, Wales. It carried the Llwydcoed Tramroad (4 feet 2 inches (1.27 m) gauge) which ran from Hirwaun to the canal head at Cwmbach, south east of Aberdare. It was built by the Aberdare Canal & Navigation Company in 1811, and was probably designed by George Overton.

Little remains of the tramroad but its route is now a footpath. The bridge is a scheduled monument and a Grade II listed building.

The bridge was declared unsafe and was completely removed for renovation. As of 2024, the bridge has reopened.
