= Whitchurch, Cardiff =

Suburb and community in Cardiff, Wales

Whitchurch: Welsh: Yr Eglwys Newydd
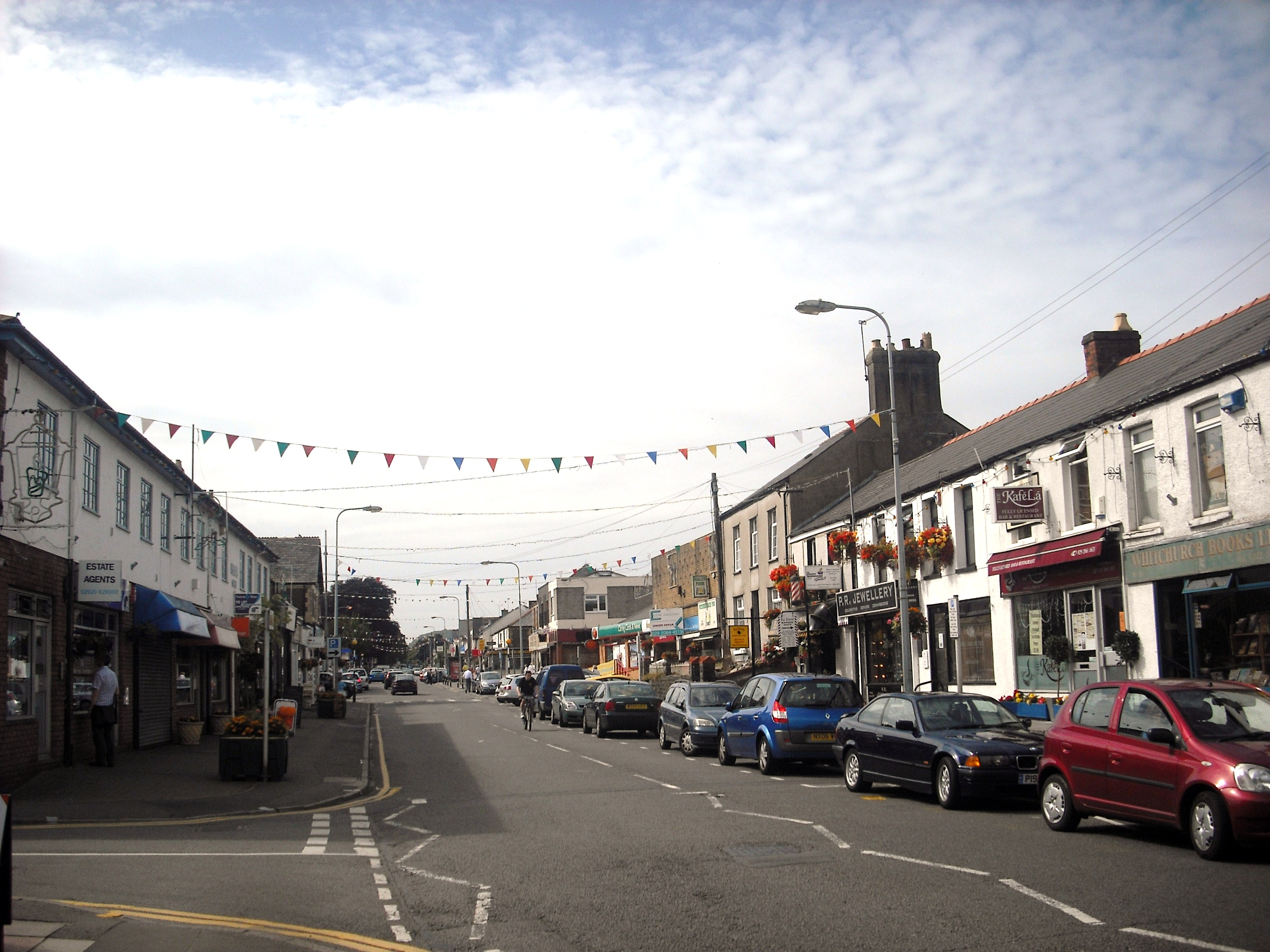
- Whitchurch main shopping street

- Location within Cardiff
- Population: 14,267 (2011)
- Community: Whitchurch
- Principal area: Cardiff
- Preserved county: Cardiff
- Country: Wales
- Sovereign state: United Kingdom
- Post town: CARDIFF
- Postcode district: CF14
- Dialling code: 029
- Police: South Wales
- Fire: South Wales
- Ambulance: Welsh
- UK Parliament: Cardiff North
- Senedd Cymru – Welsh Parliament: Cardiff North
- List of places UK Wales Cardiff 51.513°N 3.22°W Map of the community

Whitchurch (Welsh: Yr Eglwys Newydd, lit. 'the New Church') is a suburb and community in the north of Cardiff, capital of Wales. It is approximately 3 miles north of the centre of the city on the A470 road and A4054 road. It falls within the Whitchurch & Tongwynlais ward. The population of the community in 2021 was 15,817.

== Description ==
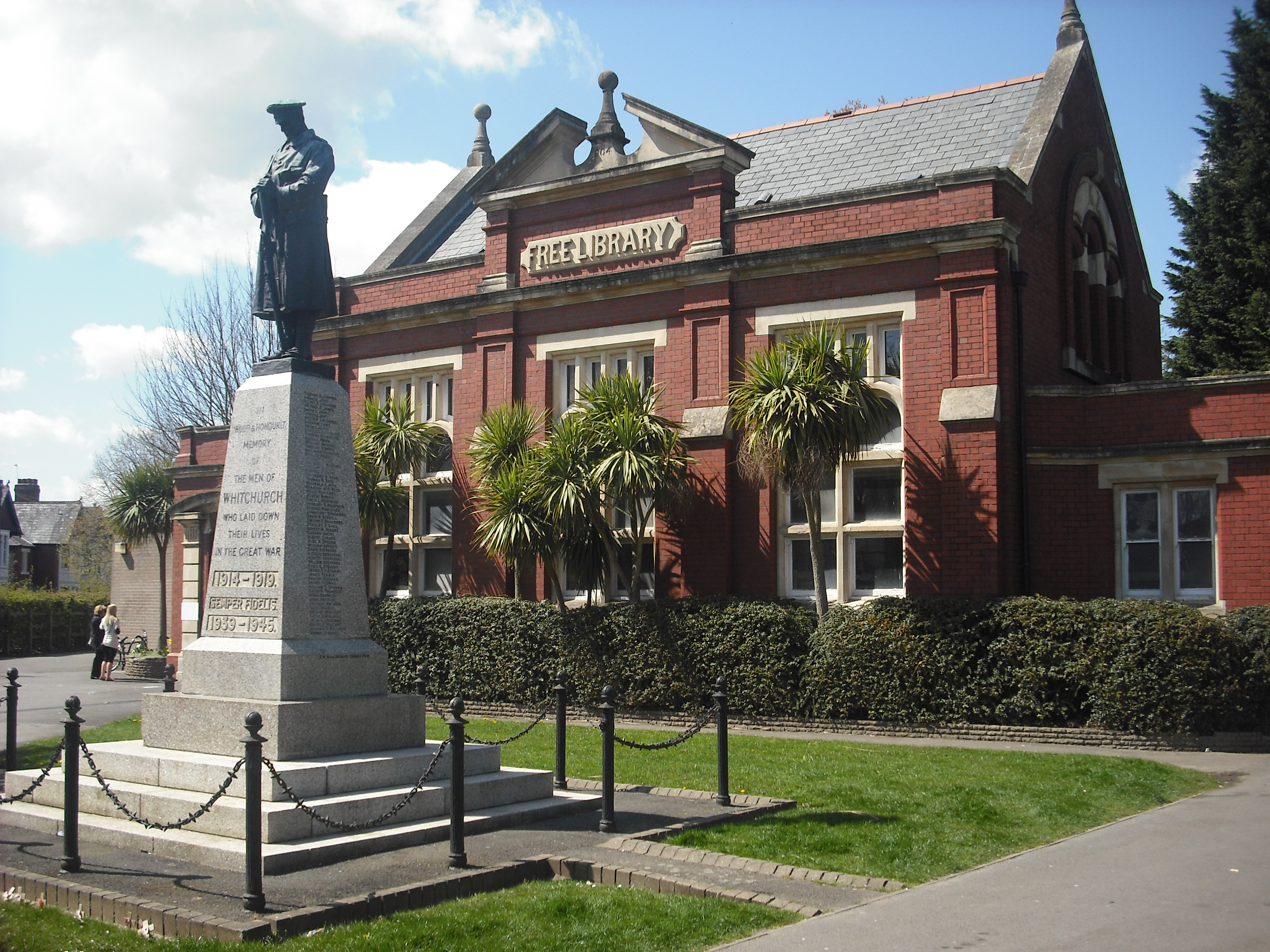
Whitchurch Library

With the expansion of Cardiff in the 20th century, Whitchurch is no longer a separate village, although residents refer commonly to "The Village" in preference to acknowledging its suburban status. The modern suburb contains a number of schools, a shopping centre, Whitchurch Library and the Velindre Cancer Centre, a major cancer hospital in Wales.

The national office of the Presbyterian Church of Wales is located at the Tabernacle Church, Whitchurch.

== History ==
Whitchurch draws its name from White Church, although its name in Welsh Yr Eglwys Newydd means The New Church. The first mention of the area was in 1126 when the land was granted to Llandaff Cathedral and a chapel was built where Old Church Road now stands. The church, St Mary's, remained a dependency of the cathedral until 1845 when it became a separate parish.

After much resistance to the Norman conquest of Wales, the area succumbed to the Normans in 1266 who created the manor of Whitchurch which included Llandaff North and Rhiwbina, and who built Castell Coch to protect the approach to Cardiff in Tongwynlais. The castle became a ruin by the 16th century, possibly attacked by Owain Glyndŵr.

Until the early 18th century there were no more than around 300 people living in about 50 farms and cottages in Whitchurch, but by the end of the 19th century, this had risen to nearly 5,000.

An education report of 1847 reported that 8% of Whitchurch's children attended school. In 1854, the area's first national school was built, charging 2d a week. Whitchurch High School opened in 1937.

In the 19th century, the Bute family assumed responsibility of Whitchurch Common. Their attempt to produce wine on the slopes below Castell Coch was short-lived, bottling 40 gallons in 1887.

Cardiff Mental Hospital, later Whitchurch Hospital, opened in 1908. Velindre Hospital opened in 1956.

In 1898 and 1922, parts of Whitchurch were absorbed into Cardiff, becoming amalgamated as a suburb of the City of Cardiff in 1967.

Whitchurch Library opened as a Carnegie library in 1904. In front of the library stands the Whitchurch War Memorial which commemorates the men of the community who died in the First and Second World Wars. Both the library and the memorial are Grade II listed buildings.

Between 1951 and 1961, the population of the parish rose from 19,827 to 27,325.

=== Melingriffith Tin Works ===
Built in 1749, the Melingriffith Tin Plate Works in north Whitchurch, on the bank of the River Taff opposite Radyr, was built on or near the site of an old corn mill that had operated as far back as the late 12th century. Melingriffith was the largest working tin factory in the UK, until the much later construction of the Treforest Tin Works.

The tin mills were powered exclusively by water drawn from the River Taff down the Melingriffith feeder stream, a water course that doubled as a canal that carried raw iron ore from the Pentyrch Iron Works until around 1815, when the Pentrych tramroad was completed. The tramroad crossed the River Taff over the Iron Bridge. The feeder's lock was permanently closed in 1871 when it was bridged over, but traces of it still remain.

The tin works closed in 1957, and today the only signs that the works ever existed at all are the mostly dry bed of the original Melingriffith feeder stream that still runs down from the River Taff from just above the Radyr weir, and the recently restored water pump standing opposite Oak Cottage. The works site itself has been completely cleared, and is now a modern housing estate.

The Melingriffith feeder stream made its way to the original Glamorganshire Canal, where they ran in parallel through the tin works and out the other side at Melingriffith Lock. Where they had come together north of the tin works, any overflow from the canal was originally designed to empty into the feeder. This point is now at the southern end of the Glamorganshire Canal local nature reserve and the water from the canal runs into the feeder before passing into a piped water course under a modern housing estate. The feeder reemerges at the Melingriffith Water Pump before flowing into the River Taff.

At the southern end of the housing estate, the feeder re-emerges at the point where the Melingriffith water pump stands, the pump originally designed to pump water from the feeder into the Canal at Melingriffith Lock. Today, the Glamorganshire Canal has been almost totally overbuilt. Ty Mawr Road has replaced the route of the canal from Melingriffith all the way to Whitchurch.

== Governance ==
Following the absorption of the village into Cardiff in 1967, Whitchurch became an electoral ward to Cardiff City Council, electing three councillors. The ward elected Conservative councillors, until 1971 when it elected its first Labour Party councillor.

After April 1974 Whitchurch became a ward to the new South Glamorgan County Council, electing three councillors, and the new second-tier Cardiff City Council, electing three city councillors. In 1985 the South Glamorgan ward was replaced with Eglwys Wen and from 1987 the Cardiff ward joined with Tongwynlais to become Whitchurch & Tongwynlais.

Since April 1995 Whitchurch & Tongwynlais has elected four councillors to County Council of the City and County of Cardiff.

The community of Whitchurch does not have a community council, in contrast to neighbouring Tongwynlais.

== Healthcare ==
=== Whitchurch Hospital ===
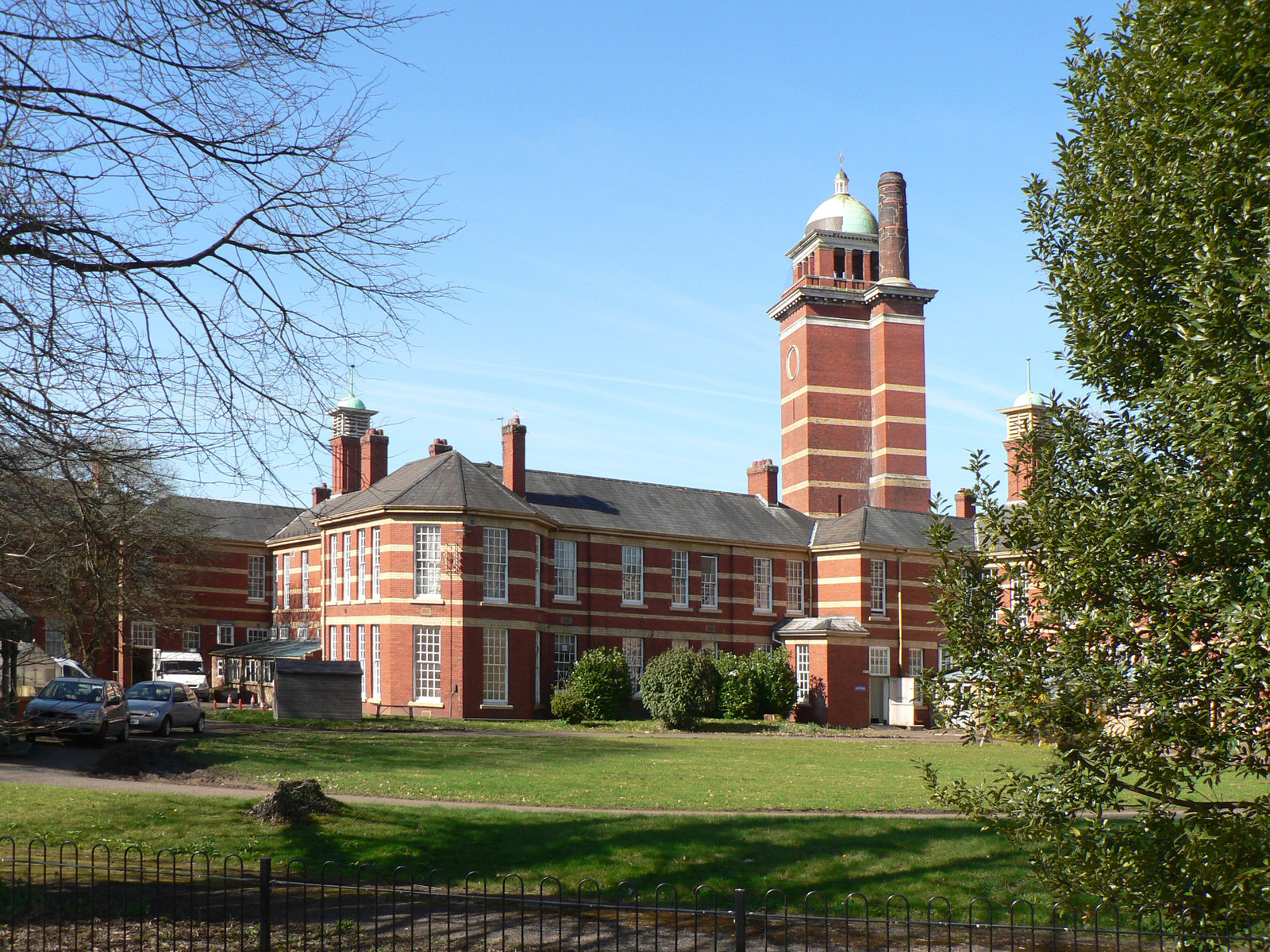
Whitchurch Hospital

Cardiff Mental Hospital, later Whitchurch Hospital, opened in 1908 accommodating 750 patients and quickly gaining a national reputation for its research. Whitchurch Hospital closed in 2016.

=== Velindre Hospital ===
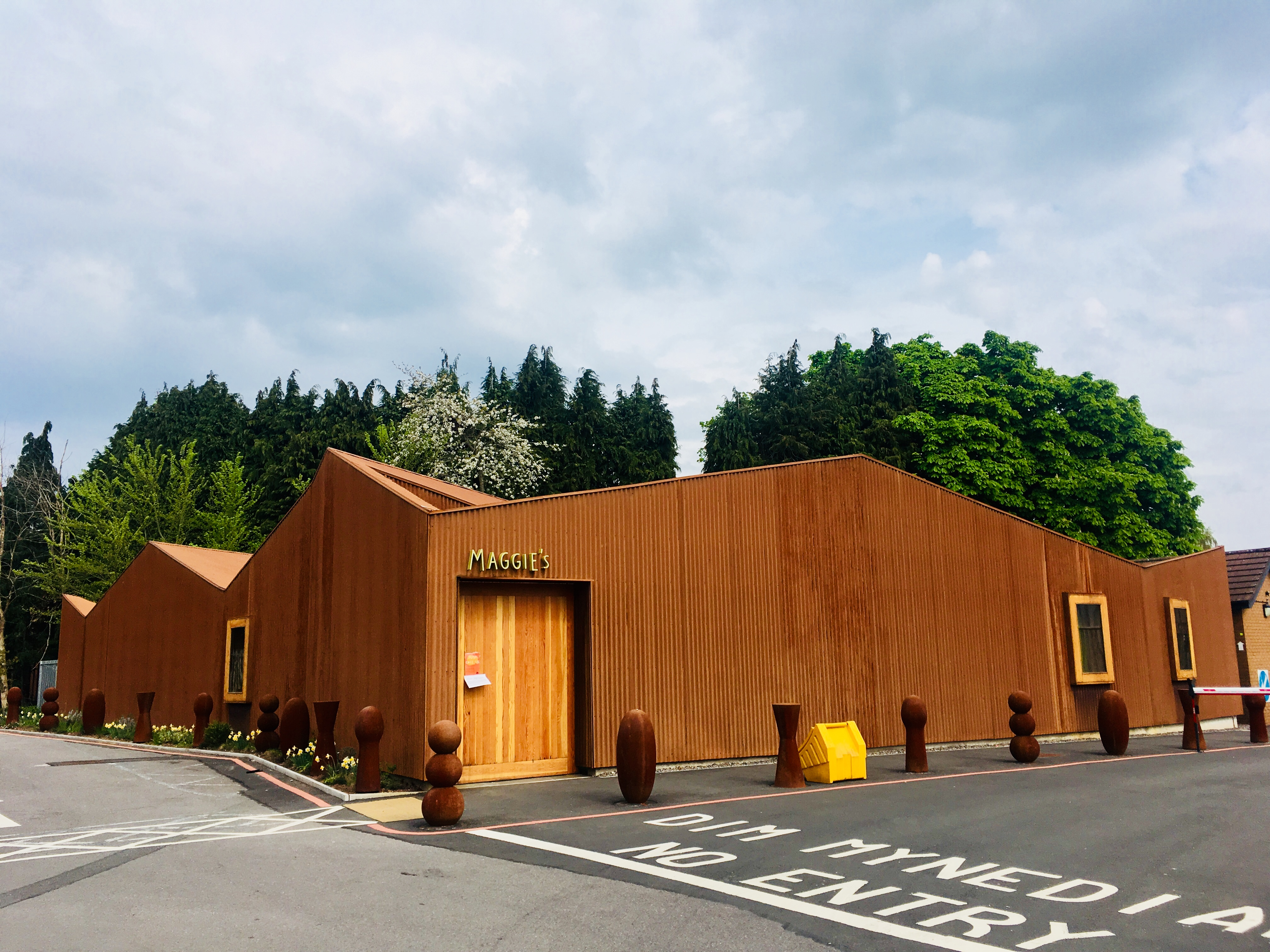
Cardiff Maggie's Centre

Velindre Hospital opened in Whitchurch in 1956 at the end of Velindre Road, specialising in treatment for cancer. In 2019 a Maggie's Centre, the second in Wales, was opened nearby, offering emotional and social support to those affected by cancer. The building is clad in a striking orange corrugated steel.

== Education ==
There are three schools in Whitchurch.

- Whitchurch High School, the largest comprehensive school in Wales with around 2400 pupils, located on Penlline Road.
- Ysgol Gymraeg Melin Gruffydd, a two form entry Welsh-medium primary school on Glan-Y-Nant Road. The school is categorised by Welsh Government in the green category as a highly effective school. Its motto is Cofia ddysgu byw.
- Whitchurch Primary School, located on Erw Las, one of the largest primary schools in Wales with over 700 pupils aged three to eleven. The school opened in September 2012 following the closure of Eglwys Newydd Primary School and Eglwys Wen Primary School. The school was officially opened by international footballer Gareth Bale. Its motto is Work together, play together, succeed together. The school is categorised by Welsh Government in the green category as a highly effective school.

== Sport ==
Whitchurch Rugby Club's Dance 1952

Whitchurch Golf Club was established in July 1914.

Whitchurch Rugby Club, known as 'Whitchurch Warriors', was established in 1892 or a few years earlier. Home games are played in Hailey Park in neighbouring Llandaff North. The club runs several teams for men, women, girls and boys. The men's first team play in Division 3, East-central C, of the WRU National Leagues.

Whitchurch High School has produced three international sporting champions: British Lions rugby captain, Sam Warburton; Champions League winning footballer, Gareth Bale; Tour de France winning cyclist, Geraint Thomas.

== Transport ==
Whitchurch lies between two urban rail lines on the Valley Lines network. The Merthyr Line runs through neighbouring Llandaff North stopping at Llandaf railway station, near Whitchurch. Trains run between the Cardiff Valleys and the Vale of Glamorgan via Cardiff city centre. Whitchurch (Cardiff) railway station is located on the Coryton Line where trains run between Coryton and Radyr via the city centre.

Cardiff Bus services 21, 23, 24, 25 and 35 run through parts of Whitchurch to Cardiff city centre.

The A470 road runs through the east of Whitchurch towards Merthyr Tydfil and North Wales.
