= 1999 Cardiff Council election =

1999 Welsh local council election

- 6 May 1999

All 75 seats to Cardiff Council 38 seats needed for a majority

	First party	Second party	Third party
Leader	Russell Goodway	Jenny Randerson	Gareth Neale
Party	Labour	Liberal Democrats	Conservative
Leader's seat	Ely	Cyncoed	Rhiwbina
Seats won	51/75	17/75	5/62
Seat change	▼7	▲8	▲4
Popular vote	101,756	72,190	50,099
	Fourth party	Fifth party
Leader	Delme Bowen	Betty Campbell
Party	Plaid Cymru	Independent
Leader's seat	Creigiau & St. Fagans	Butetown
Seats won	1/33	1/1
Seat change	0	▲1
Popular vote	21,384	770
Council control before election
Labour
Council control after election
Labour

The 1999 Cardiff Council election was the second election to the post-1996 Cardiff Council following the re-organization of local government in Wales. It was held on Thursday 6 May 1999. It was preceded by the 1995 election and followed by the 2004 elections. On the same day the first elections to the Welsh Assembly were held as well as elections to the other 21 local authorities in Wales. Labour retained a majority of the seats.

== Overview ==
All council seats were up for election. This was the second election to be held following local government reorganisation and the abolition of South Glamorgan County Council. In 1995 the ward boundaries for the new authority were based on the previous Cardiff City Council but, effective from the 1999 election, The City and County of Cardiff (Electoral Arrangements) Order 1998 increased the number of wards to 29 and the number of councillors to 75.

Five new seats were created by adding additional seats to five existing wards. Labour won three of the new seats and the Liberal Democrats won the remaining two.

== Outcome ==
The Labour Party won a comfortable majority of seats although it lost some ground compared to the inaugural elections four years previously. Of the 67 councillors elected in 1995, 43 were again returned in 1999 (38 Labour, 4 Liberal Democrat and 1 Plaid Cymru).

Betty Campbell, a community campaigner, former headteacher and Butetown councillor between 1991 and 1995, was the only independent councillor elected.

Cardiff Council election result 1999
Party	Seats	Gains	Losses	Net gain/loss	Seats %	Votes %	Votes	+/−
Labour	51	3	10	-7	68.0	40.4	101,756	
Liberal Democrats	17	8	0	+8	22.7	28.6	72,190	
Conservative	5	4	0	+4	6.7	19.9	50,099	
Plaid Cymru	1	0	0	0	1.3	8.5	21,384	
Green	0	0	0	0	0.0	1.6	3,984	
Independent Labour	0	0	0	0	0.0	0.4	1,053	
Socialist	0	0	0	0	0.0	0.2	604	
Communist	0	0	0	0	0.0	0.1	267	
Residents	0	0	0	0	0.0	0.1	263	
Independent	1	1	0	+1	1.3	0.2	507	

== Ward results ==
=== Adamstown (2 seats) ===
Adamsdown
Party	Candidate	Votes	%	±%
Liberal Democrats	Nigel Howells	1,156	50.2	+21.2
Liberal Democrats	John Dixon	1,010		
Labour	Kenneth Hutchings*	817	35.5	−12.0
Labour	Catherine Colley	805		
Plaid Cymru	Terence O'Neill	255	11.1	+6.2
Communist	Rhian Cartwight	74	3.2	+1.4
Turnout			41.0	+0.5
Registered electors		5,374		
Liberal Democrats gain from Labour		Swing		
Liberal Democrats gain from Labour		Swing		

=== Butetown (1 seat) ===
Butetown
Party	Candidate	Votes	%	±%
Independent	Betty Campbell	507	43.1	N/A
Labour	Mohammed Javed	364	31.0	−47.3
Plaid Cymru	Neil Sinclair	162	13.8	+5.5
Liberal Democrats	Manuel Dossantos	81	6.9	+1.1
Conservative	Ronald Thomas	61	5.2	−2.4
Turnout			41.6	+10.5
Registered electors		2,930		
Independent gain from Labour		Swing		

=== Caerau (2 seats) ===
Caerau
Party	Candidate	Votes	%	±%
Labour	Harry Ernest*	1,280	46.9	+0.4
Liberal Democrats	Jacqui Gasson*	1,080	39.5	−9.3
Labour	Julie Mawn	1,009		
Liberal Democrats	Steven Coles	633		
Plaid Cymru	Robert Garland	194	7.1	+5.3
Conservative	Alan Horwood	178	6.5	+3.6
Conservative	Wendy Rees	148		
Turnout			34.2	−0.7
Registered electors		7,173		
Labour hold		Swing		
Liberal Democrats hold		Swing		

=== Canton (3 seats) ===
Canton
Party	Candidate	Votes	%	±%
Labour	Kevin Brennan*	2,379	41.6	−10.0
Labour	Cherry Short*	1,882		
Labour	David Thomas*	1,773		
Plaid Cymru	Keith Bush	1,386	24.3	+15.9
Conservative	Harold Burns	771	13.5	+3.2
Conservative	Ronald Trigg	668		
Conservative	Helen Cox	638		
Liberal Democrats	Glenys Hannam	613	10.7	−12.4
Liberal Democrats	Margaret Fawcett	606		
Green	Vivien Turner	566	9.9	+3.4
Liberal Democrats	Steven Jeffreys	484		
Turnout			45.2	+3.5
Registered electors		10,315		
Labour hold		Swing		
Labour hold		Swing		
Labour hold		Swing		

=== Cathays (4 seats) ===
An additional fourth seat was created in this ward.

Cathays
Party	Candidate	Votes	%	±%
Liberal Democrats	Jonathan Aylwin	2,439	36.4	−1.4
Liberal Democrats	Fred Hornblow*	2,285		
Liberal Democrats	Jane Reece	2,060		
Liberal Democrats	Simon Wakefield	1,992		
Labour	Sarah Merry*	1,555	23.2	−17.4
Labour	Kathryn Slade*	1,466		
Labour	David Hagendyk	1,437		
Plaid Cymru	Carwyn Fowler	1,257	18.8	+9.8
Labour	Reginald Surridge	1,173		
Green	Nick Clark	838	12.5	+2.6
Conservative	Kim Summerhayes	422	6.3	N/A
Conservative	William Selwood	202		
Communist	John Lent	193	2.9	+0.1
Turnout			39.6	+1.8
Registered electors		12,825		
Liberal Democrats gain from Labour		Swing		
Liberal Democrats hold		Swing		
Liberal Democrats gain from Labour		Swing		
Liberal Democrats win (new seat)				

=== Creigiau & St. Fagans (1 seat) ===
Creigiau & St. Fagans
Party	Candidate	Votes	%	±%
Plaid Cymru	Delme Bowen	818	53.7	+10.5
Conservative	Diana Abuzaid	342	22.5	+12.5
Labour	Michael Kelly	227	14.9	−7.5
Liberal Democrats	Peter Borrow	135	8.9	+6.5
Turnout			52.7	+4.1
Registered electors		2,908		
Plaid Cymru hold		Swing		

=== Cyncoed (3 seats) ===
Cyncoed
Party	Candidate	Votes	%	±%
Liberal Democrats	Jenny Randerson*	3,028	53.3	−3.5
Liberal Democrats	J. Owen Pryce*	2,507		
Liberal Democrats	Kathryn Lloyd	2,418		
Conservative	Joan Gibby	1.113	19.6	−3.9
Conservative	Peter Meyer	1,088		
Conservative	Vivian Pearcey	1,048		
Labour	Adrian Matthewson	754	13.3	−0.6
Labour	Malcolm Marshall	601		
Labour	Prabhat Verma	580		
Plaid Cymru	Huw Lewis	534	9.4	+6.1
Green	Dianne Corker	255	4.5	+1.9
Turnout			59.2	+7.0
Registered electors		8,740		
Liberal Democrats hold		Swing		
Liberal Democrats hold		Swing		
Liberal Democrats hold		Swing		

=== Ely (3 seats) ===
Ely
Party	Candidate	Votes	%	±%
Labour	Brian Finn*	1,809	50.5	−27.1
Labour	Charles Gale*	1,793		
Labour	Russell Goodway*	1,452		
Liberal Democrats	Jennifer Davies	728	20.3	+12.7
Plaid Cymru	Harri Parri	531	14.8	+9.3
Liberal Democrats	Robin Fawcett	521		
Conservative	Michael Rees	513	14.3	+5.0
Liberal Democrats	Roydon Leyshon	50		
Turnout			30.4	+1.4
Registered electors		10,125		
Labour hold		Swing		
Labour hold		Swing		
Labour hold		Swing		

=== Fairwater (3 seats) ===
Fairwater
Party	Candidate	Votes	%	±%
Labour	Maxwell Phillips*	1,968	48.7	−23.7
Labour	Michael Michael*	1,774		
Labour	Derek Rees*	1,598		
Conservative	Dorothy Marks	717	17.7	+6.4
Liberal Democrats	Stewart Pye	690	17.1	+7.3
Plaid Cymru	Diana Bianchi	669	16.5	+10.0
Liberal Democrats	Hilary Borrow	665		
Liberal Democrats	Nia Roberts	645		
Turnout			36.3	+2.3
Registered electors		9,692		
Labour hold		Swing		
Labour hold		Swing		
Labour hold		Swing		

=== Gabalfa (2 seats) ===
An additional second seat was created in this ward.

Gabalfa
Party	Candidate	Votes	%	±%
Labour	R. Ian Brown	948	37.2	−33.0
Labour	Jean Wilkinson*	867		
Plaid Cymru	Alan Jobbins	607	23.8	+17.0
Liberal Democrats	Cathy Pearcy	607	23.8	+14.7
Liberal Democrats	Kelly Gubbin	573		
Conservative	Graham Thomas	385	15.1	+4.2
Conservative	Alexandra Mortimer	364		
Turnout			36.0	+3.3
Registered electors		6,639		
Labour hold		Swing		
Labour win (new seat)				

=== Grangetown (3 seats) ===
Grangetown
Party	Candidate	Votes	%	±%
Labour	John Smith*	1,859	52.6	−5.9
Labour	Lynda Thorne*	1,831		
Labour	Peter Perkins*	1,742		
Plaid Cymru	Patrick Daley	608	17.2	+11.6
Conservative	Jean Summerhayes	547	15.5	−0.5
Conservative	Frances Arnold	546		
Liberal Democrats	Mary Horton	518	14.7	+8.4
Liberal Democrats	Graham Feeney	505		
Conservative	Douglas Gentles	503		
Liberal Democrats	Desmond Sanford	398		
Turnout			34.7	−1.1
Registered electors		9,649		
Labour hold		Swing		
Labour hold		Swing		
Labour hold		Swing		

=== Heath (3 seats) ===
Heath
Party	Candidate	Votes	%	±%
Liberal Democrats	John James	1,826	29.7	−3.9
Labour	Graham Hinchey*	1,763	28.7	−6.9
Liberal Democrats	Graham Harris	1,760		
Conservative	Greville Tatham	1,479	24.0	+1.3
Liberal Democrats	Alastair Meikle	1,424		
Labour	Gloria Jenkins	1,415		
Conservative	Howard Philpott	1,336		
Conservative	Wayne Warlow	1,237		
Labour	Gerard Moreton	1,189		
Plaid Cymru	Nans Couch	706	11.5	+7.7
Green	Chris Von Ruhland	376	6.1	+1.9
Turnout			62.1	+8.0
Registered electors		9,338		
Liberal Democrats gain from Labour		Swing		
Labour hold		Swing		
Liberal Democrats hold		Swing		

=== Lisvane (1 seat) ===
Lisvane
Party	Candidate	Votes	%	±%
Conservative	David Walker	1,005	61.6	+5.9
Labour	Marie Pryce	270	16.6	−7.0
Liberal Democrats	A. Peter Saunders	251	15.4	+1.3
Plaid Cymru	Anthony Couch	105	6.4	+2.8
Turnout			62.5	+22.7
Registered electors		2,664		
Conservative hold		Swing		

=== Llandaff (2 seats) ===
Llandaff
Party	Candidate	Votes	%	±%
Labour	Gregory Owens*	1,525	36.5	−7.5
Labour	John Sheppard*	1,409		
Conservative	Julius Hermer	1,357	32.5	−0.4
Conservative	Andrew Gretton	1,226		
Plaid Cymru	Gwen Jones	659	15.8	+6.3
Liberal Democrats	Jeffery Evans	637	15.2	+6.7
Liberal Democrats	Lee Stewart	516		
Turnout			55.7	+8.5
Registered electors		7,164		
Labour hold		Swing		
Labour hold		Swing		

=== Llandaff North (2 seats) ===
Llandaff North
Party	Candidate	Votes	%	±%
Labour	Anthony Earle*	1,520	55.2	−16.5
Labour	Philip Robinson*	1,251		
Plaid Cymru	Ceri James	429	15.6	+10.9
Liberal Democrats	Ann James	417	15.2	+5.4
Conservative	Ceri-Ann Fox	386	14.0	+3.6
Conservative	John Marshall	337		
Liberal Democrats	Teresa Lewis	274		
Turnout			42.7	+1.2
Registered electors		5,990		
Labour hold		Swing		
Labour hold		Swing		

=== Llanishen (4 seats) ===
An additional fourth seat was created in this ward.

Llanishen
Party	Candidate	Votes	%	±%
Labour	Nicholas Butler*	2,436	39.4	−18.5
Labour	Garry Hunt*	2,427		
Labour	Christopher Bettinson*	2,363		
Labour	Gretta Albinus	2,354		
Conservative	Yvonne Jenkins	1,608	26.0	−0.3
Conservative	Kenneth Roberts	1,608		
Conservative	Stephen Gardener	1,486		
Conservative	Robert Trethewey	1,385		
Liberal Democrats	Philip Hampton	1,081	17.5	+6.9
Plaid Cymru	Lona Roberts	1,052	17.0	+11.8
Liberal Democrats	Graham Hallett	1,016		
Liberal Democrats	Veronica Hallett	1,011		
Liberal Democrats	John Frankham-Barnes	1,002		
Turnout			50.0	+1.4
Registered electors		11,645		
Labour hold		Swing		
Labour hold		Swing		
Labour hold		Swing		
Labour win (new seat)				

=== Llanrumney (3 seats) ===
Llanrumney
Party	Candidate	Votes	%	±%
Labour	Gillian Bird*	1,705	54.4	−13.0
Labour	Brian James*	1,514		
Labour	Christine James	1,403		
Plaid Cymru	C. Lewis	613	19.6	+14.6
Plaid Cymru	Christopher Hoyle	493		
Plaid Cymru	David Reeves	481		
Conservative	Stephen Woods	386	12.3	+4.9
Conservative	Hayley Lewis	343		
Conservative	Francis Prew	318		
Liberal Democrats	Elizabeth Hill	314	10.0	+5.8
Liberal Democrats	Philip Bramhall	283		
Liberal Democrats	W. Jeremy	281		
Socialist	D. Bartlett	115	3.7	N/A
Socialist	G. Evans	69		
Socialist	K. Williams	56		
Turnout			36.9	+0.6
Registered electors		8,109		
Labour hold		Swing		
Labour hold		Swing		
Labour hold		Swing		

=== Pentwyn (4 seats) ===
An additional fourth seat was created in this ward.

Pentwyn
Party	Candidate	Votes	%	±%
Labour	Vita Jones*	1,880	41.9	−27.8
Labour	Brian Pinnell*	1,745		
Labour	James Regan*	1,658		
Liberal Democrats	William Cookson	1,575	35.1	+19.6
Liberal Democrats	J. Fletcher	1,559		
Labour	D. Richards	1,522		
Liberal Democrats	B. Parsons	1,386		
Liberal Democrats	G. Horton	1,351		
Plaid Cymru	D. Henry	589	13.1	+6.1
Conservative	J. Goodwin	439	9.8	+2.0
Conservative	G. Hughes	423		
Turnout			37.8	+6.5
Registered electors		10,692		
Labour hold		Swing		
Labour hold		Swing		
Labour hold		Swing		
Liberal Democrats win (new seat)				

=== Pentyrch (1 seat) ===
Pentyrch
Party	Candidate	Votes	%	±%
Labour	Christine Priday*	547	38.9	−4.3
Plaid Cymru	Penri Williams	456	32.5	+2.6
Conservative	A. Walker	286	20.4	N/A
Liberal Democrats	R. Burley	116	8.3	+7.1
Turnout			51.6	−1.3
Registered electors		2,726		
Labour hold		Swing		

=== Penylan (3 seats) ===
Penylan
Party	Candidate	Votes	%	±%
Liberal Democrats	L. Kelloway	2,846	52.2	+5.2
Liberal Democrats	P. Burfoot	2,774		
Liberal Democrats	Freda Salway*	2,700		
Labour	J. Anderson	1,173	21.5	−5.4
Labour	C. Bewes	977		
Labour	J. Imperato	965		
Conservative	L. Johnson	733	13.4	−1.6
Plaid Cymru	C. Pugh	700	12.8	−6.6
Conservative	Peter Meyer	688		
Conservative	V. Stocqueler	591		
Turnout			54.2	+13.0
Registered electors		9,515		
Liberal Democrats hold		Swing		
Liberal Democrats hold		Swing		
Liberal Democrats hold		Swing		

=== Plasnewydd (4 seats) ===
Plasnewydd
Party	Candidate	Votes	%	±%
Labour	A. Cox*	2,149	30.9	−25.3
Liberal Democrats	H. Douglas	1,974	28.4	+16.6
Labour	Susan Lent*	1,965		
Labour	P. Morris*	1,930		
Liberal Democrats	Mark Stephens	1,860		
Liberal Democrats	V. Snell	1,727		
Labour	Geoff Mungham*	1,529		
Plaid Cymru	E. Parish	1,259	18.1	+5.9
Liberal Democrats	Rodney Berman	1,042		
Green	P. Ward	871	12.5	+2.5
Conservative	G. Donaldson	506	7.3	+0.3
Conservative	V. Palmer	439		
Communist	S. O'Brien	194	2.8	±0.0
Turnout			38.7	+3.5
Registered electors		13,693		
Labour hold		Swing		
Liberal Democrats gain from Labour		Swing		
Labour hold		Swing		
Labour hold		Swing		

=== Pontprennau & Old St. Mellons (2 seats) ===
Pontprennau & Old St. Mellons
Party	Candidate	Votes	%	±%
Labour	P. Cubitt	855	35.2	+11.6
Labour	Georgina Phillips	839		
Conservative	Dianne Rees	728	30.0	−25.7
Conservative	S. Whiting	627		
Liberal Democrats	A. Evans	510	21.0	+6.9
Plaid Cymru	D. Jenkins	336	13.8	+10.2
Liberal Democrats	L. Fletcher	327		
Turnout			45.7	+7.7
Registered electors		5,017		
Labour hold		Swing		
Labour hold		Swing		

=== Radyr (1 seat) ===
Radyr
Party	Candidate	Votes	%	±%
Labour	Marion Drake	1,296	59.9	−7.7
Conservative	C. Kolmar	427	19.7	−4.2
Liberal Democrats	D. Garrow-Smith	318	14.7	+10.4
Plaid Cymru	M. Goode	123	5.7	+1.6
Turnout			59.8	+7.9
Registered electors		3,620		
Labour hold		Swing		

=== Rhiwbina (3 seats) ===
Rhiwbina
Party	Candidate	Votes	%	±%
Conservative	Gareth Neale*	2,528	40.1	+4.3
Conservative	Jayne Cowan	2,248		
Conservative	Jack Scherer	2,042		
Labour	P. Owen*	1,770	28.1	−12.9
Labour	P. Hunt	1,647		
Labour	N. Watson	1,534		
Liberal Democrats	A. Evans	1,213	19.3	+5.0
Liberal Democrats	S. Spear	1,113		
Liberal Democrats	J. Richards	1,070		
Plaid Cymru	Falmai Griffiths	786	12.5	+7.1
Turnout			56.5	+2.0
Registered electors		9,350		
Conservative gain from Labour		Swing		
Conservative gain from Labour		Swing		
Conservative gain from Labour		Swing		

=== Riverside (3 seats) ===
Riverside
Party	Candidate	Votes	%	±%
Labour	P. Mitchell	1,670	30.7	−27.7
Labour	D. Sharpe	1,462		
Labour	Neil McEvoy	1,408		
Plaid Cymru	A. Balcombe	1,103	20.3	+6.8
Residents	J. Singh*	777	14.3	N/A
Green	P. Lukes	695	12.8	+1.6
Liberal Democrats	A. Wigley	517	9.5	+0.8
Liberal Democrats	D. Forward	465		
Liberal Democrats	R. Hewlett	457		
Conservative	M. Evans	420	7.7	−0.6
Conservative	W. Donaldson	411		
Conservative	C. Trigg	323		
Socialist	A. Conchar	263	4.8	N/A
Turnout			41.9	+4.7
Registered electors		9,204		
Labour hold		Swing		
Labour hold		Swing		
Labour hold		Swing		

=== Rumney (2 seats) ===
Rumney
Party	Candidate	Votes	%	±%
Labour	Robert Derbyshire	1,212	47.7	−13.4
Labour	S. Pantak*	1,079		
Conservative	R. Hollands-Roberts	611	24.0	+13.7
Conservative	L. Morgan	503		
Plaid Cymru	D. Owen	366	14.4	+11.8
Liberal Democrats	D. Hourahane	353	13.9	+10.2
Liberal Democrats	D. Rees	347		
Turnout			37.0	+0.5
Registered electors		6,571		
Labour hold		Swing		
Labour hold		Swing		

=== Splott (3 seats) ===
An additional third seat was created in this ward.

Splott
Party	Candidate	Votes	%	±%
Labour	Clarissa Holland*	1,763	54.2	−8.1
Labour	G. Houlston*	1,649		
Labour	Martin Holland	1,591		
Plaid Cymru	A. O'Neill	614	18.9	+14.8
Liberal Democrats	K. Chubb	497	15.3	+12.2
Liberal Democrats	M. Mathias	431		
Liberal Democrats	S. Reece	329		
Conservative	J. McCarthy	278	8.5	+5.3
Conservative	B. Jeffreys	269		
Conservative	C. Prew	214		
Socialist	D. Reid	101	3.1	N/A
Turnout			35.2	−11.4
Registered electors		8,133		
Labour hold		Swing		
Labour hold		Swing		

=== Trowbridge (3 seats) ===
An additional third seat was created in this ward.

Trowbridge
Party	Candidate	Votes	%	±%
Labour	R. Cook	1,424	52.7	−22.3
Labour	L. Ackerman	1,272		
Labour	D. English*	1,200		
Plaid Cymru	D. Williams	502	18.6	+14.5
Liberal Democrats	A. Northmore-Thomas	427	15.8	+8.9
Liberal Democrats	A. Thomas	427		
Liberal Democrats	H. Northmore-Thomas	385		
Conservative	B-A Jenkins	347	12.9	+3.8
Conservative	A. Cox	316		
Turnout			28.4	+0.6
Registered electors		9,185		
Labour hold		Swing		
Labour hold		Swing		
Labour win (new seat)				

=== Whitchurch & Tongwynlais (4 seats) ===
Whitchurch & Tongwynlais
Party	Candidate	Votes	%	±%
Labour	Sophie Howe	2,287	28.0	+20.6
Conservative	W. Griffiths	2,276	27.8	+1.0
Labour	K. Price*	2,271		
Labour	R. Pearson*	2,165		
Labour	W. Thomas	2,131		
Conservative	Brian Griffiths	2,039		
Conservative	Timothy Davies	2,028		
Conservative	D. Williams-Masinda	1,608		
Independent Labour	W. Salmon*	1,053	12.9	N/A
Plaid Cymru	G. Lewis	1,049	12.8	+1.2
Plaid Cymru	Colin Palfrey	998		
Plaid Cymru	John Rowlands	965		
Plaid Cymru	Delwyn Sion	944		
Liberal Democrats	A. Leavers	869	10.6	+2.3
Liberal Democrats	G. Mellen	743		
Liberal Democrats	P. Azzopardi	684		
Liberal Democrats	D. Wright	663		
Green	S. Martin	383	4.7	±0.0
Independent	Victor Riley	263	3.2	N/A
Turnout			57.1	+4.6
Registered electors		12,145		
Labour hold		Swing		
Conservative gain from Labour		Swing		
Labour hold		Swing		
Labour hold		Swing		

== By-elections between 1999 and 2004 ==
=== Cyncoed ===
Cyncoed by-election, 30 November 2000
Party	Candidate	Votes	%	±%
Liberal Democrats	David Rees	1,902	54.3	+1.0
Conservative		1,132	32.3	+12.7
Labour		271	7.7	−5.6
Majority		770	22.0	N/A
Turnout			39.8	−19.4
Registered electors				
Liberal Democrats hold		Swing		

The by-election was called following the resignation of Cllr. Jenny Randerson.

=== Canton ===
Canton by-election, 7 June 2001
Party	Candidate	Votes	%	±%
Labour	Ramesh Patel	3,130	48.0	+9.2
Conservative		1,266	19.4	+6.1
Plaid Cymru		1,170	18.0	−18.8
Liberal Democrats		950	14.6	+9.2
Majority		1,960	28.6	N/A
Turnout				
Registered electors				
Labour hold		Swing		

The by-election was called following the election of Cllr. Kevin Brennan as the Member for the Parliamentary constituency of Cardiff West.

=== Llandaff North ===
Llandaff North by-election, 7 June 2001
Party	Candidate	Votes	%	±%
Labour	C. Bewes	2,115	57.1	+2.1
Conservative		664	17.9	+3.6
Liberal Democrats		566	15.3	+1.6
Plaid Cymru		362	9.8	−7.2
Majority		1,549	39.2	N/A
Turnout				
Registered electors				
Labour hold		Swing		

=== Gabalfa ===
Gabalfa by-election, 7 February 2002
Party	Candidate	Votes	%	±%
Liberal Democrats	Cathy Pearcy	925	55.3	+31.5
Labour		451	26.9	−10.3
Conservative		138	8.2	−6.9
Plaid Cymru		116	6.9	−16.9
Socialist Alliance		44	2.6	N/A
Majority		474	28.4	N/A
Turnout			25.0	−11.0
Registered electors				
Liberal Democrats gain from Labour		Swing		

=== Pentwyn ===
Pentwyn by-election, 11 September 2003
Party	Candidate	Votes	%	±%
Liberal Democrats	Judith Woodman	1,836	66.5	+31.4
Labour		673	24.4	−17.5
Conservative		169	6.1	−3.7
Socialist Alliance		81	2.9	N/A
Majority		1,163	42.1	N/A
Turnout			28.9	−8.9
Registered electors				
Liberal Democrats hold		Swing		

The by-election was called following the resignation of Cllr. Bill Cookson.
