= Creigiau =

Village in Cardiff, Wales

Coordinates: 51.523°N 3.326°W

- Location within Cardiff
- Population: 5,153 (ward 2011)
- Principal area: Cardiff
- Preserved county: South Glamorgan
- Country: Wales
- Sovereign state: United Kingdom
- Post town: CARDIFF
- Postcode district: CF15
- Dialling code: 029
- Police: South Wales
- Fire: South Wales
- Ambulance: Welsh
- UK Parliament: Cardiff West
- Senedd Cymru – Welsh Parliament: Cardiff West

Creigiau is a dormitory settlement in the north-west of Cardiff, the capital of Wales. The village currently has about 1,500 houses and a population of approximately 5,000 people. Prior to 2022, the Cardiff electoral ward covering the village was Creigiau & St Fagans. Following the recommendations of the Local Democracy and Boundary Commission for Wales, the ward was merged with Pentyrch to form the new ward of "Pentyrch and St Fagans", effective from the 2022 Cardiff Council election. The village has a strong Welsh-speaking community, and along with Pentyrch has one of the largest clusters of Welsh-speakers in Cardiff. 23.4% of the village speaks Welsh.

== History ==
Creigiau's former industrial centre was a quarry, which opened in the 1870s and closed in 2001. The village was linked to Cardiff and Barry by the Barry Railway's Creigiau railway station, located on the eastern edge of the village, which was closed as part of the Beeching cuts. The Welsh language has always had a strong presence in Creigiau, and the majority of its inhabitants still spoke Welsh in 1890.

In the mid-1970s, housing estates sprang up to accommodate commuters. A further large housing estate was built during the 1980s to further accommodate the growing number of commuters wanting to live in the village. This estate is still locally known as "the new estate" or "lower Creigiau".

Creigiau became part of the Unitary authority of Cardiff in 1996 following Local Government reorganisation.

=== Castell-y-mynach ===
Castell-y-mynach is a late medieval manor house, reputedly built in the fifteenth century. It was remodelled in the early seventeenth century and contains seventeenth- and eighteenth-century wall paintings. The house is now surrounded by a modern housing development.

=== Creigiau Pottery ===
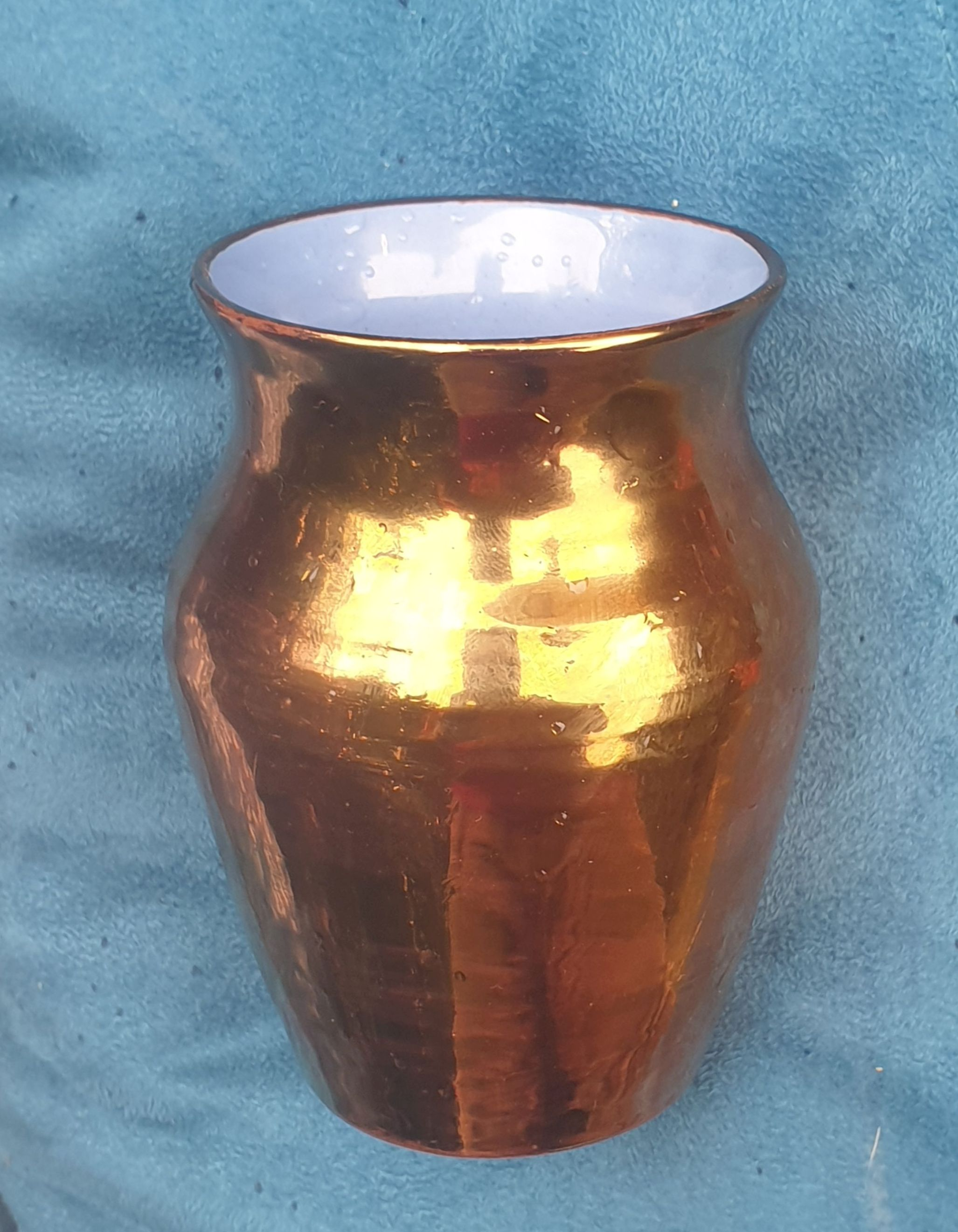
Creigiau copper lustre pot

A pottery studio was set up by Reg and Jean Southcliffe in 1947 as the Southcliffe Ceramic Company, renamed to Creigiau Pottery in 1948. Creigiau produced domestic tableware in either a pale grey glaze, or their best-known copper lustreware. A distinctive Creigiau piece is their kitsch Welsh Pie Dragon, a lustreware pie funnel in the shape of a Welsh dragon rather than the usual bird.

In 1962, Tom also took over the Claypits Pottery at Ewenny, nearby to the Ewenny Pottery. He renamed it Vale Pottery, after the Vale of Glamorgan, it later being renamed again under new owners as Helyg Pottery.

== Governance ==
Creigiau was formerly an electoral ward to Taff Ely Borough Council. In 1995, Creigiau became part of Cardiff and the ward elected a Plaid Cymru councillor, Delme Bowen, to Cardiff Council (Cardiff's first Plaid Cymru councillor for 23 years).

Since 1999, Creigiau has been covered by a new ward, Creigiau & St Fagans.

== Amenities ==
Local amenities include a bilingual primary school, which teaches through the medium of both Welsh and English, a golf club, a convenience store with a post office, a recreation ground managed by village residents (home of local archery, cricket, football, petanque and tennis clubs), a GP surgery, and local pub called 'The Creigiau Inn'.

== Transport ==
A few bus routes serve the area, mainly operated by Stagecoach and Cardiff Bus

A new Rapid Transit Line could be built from Creigiau to St Mellons in Cardiff, via Cardiff City Centre and the Welsh Parliament by 2024. Plans for the South Wales Metro include this line as part of the "Cardiff Crossrail Project", which could also mean the line could be extended further.
