= Kiera Marshall =

Welsh politician (born 1997 or 1998)

Kiera Marshall MS
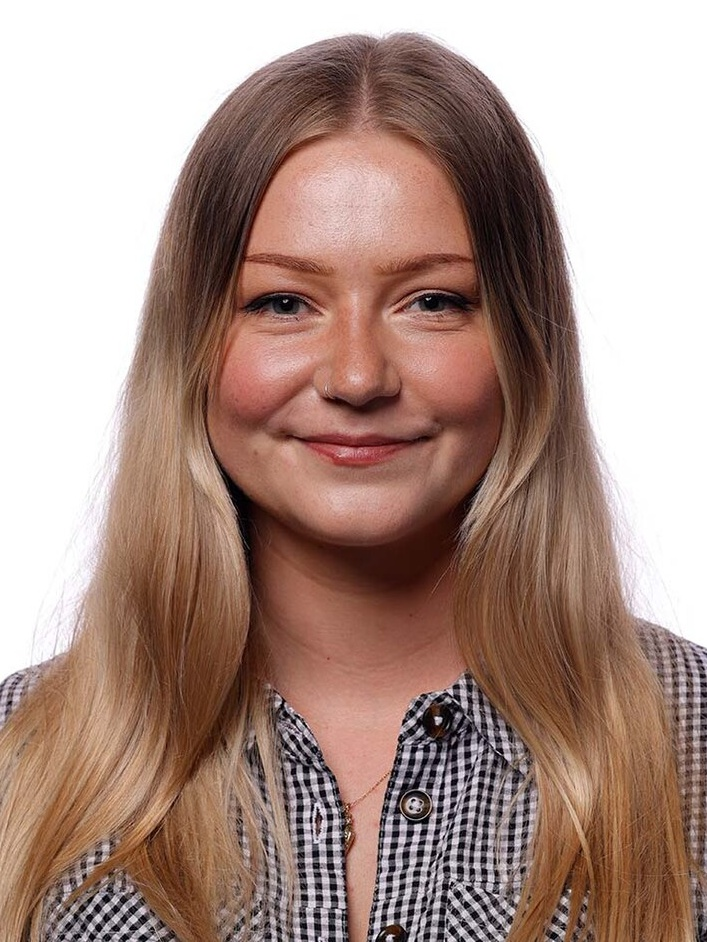
- Official portrait, 2026

Member of the Senedd
- Incumbent
- Assumed office 8 May 2026
- Constituency: Caerdydd Penarth

Personal details
- Born: Kiera Duncan Marshall; 1997 or 1998 (age 28–29)
- Party: Plaid Cymru
- Children: 1
- Education: Gower College Swansea; London School of Economics

Kiera Duncan Marshall (born 1997 or 1998) is a Welsh Plaid Cymru politician who has served as a member of the Senedd (MS) for Caerdydd Penarth since May 2026.

== Early life and career ==
Marshall was born in 1997 or 1998 to English parents and raised in Townhill, Swansea, Wales. Her mother was a charity worker. Marshall attended Gower College Swansea, where she studied politics at A-level, and later studied economics at the London School of Economics. She has previously worked in hospitality and served as the deputy head of policy for the Welsh branch of the Federation of Small Businesses.

== Political career ==
Marshall had worked as the lead researcher for the Plaid Cymru Economy, Transport, and Post-16 Education group at the Senedd, and previously volunteered for Member of the Senedd (MS) Bethan Sayed.

In the 2024 general election, Marshall stood as the Plaid candidate for Cardiff West, receiving 9,423 votes (21.1%) and coming second, defeated by Labour candidate Alex Barros-Curtis. The result was the second largest vote share increase (12.5%) for Plaid in the election and the party’s largest in a general election in Cardiff.

In the 2026 Senedd election, Marshall was elected as an MS for the six-member Caerdydd Penarth constituency, with Plaid receiving 36,136 votes (41%). She was elected alongside fellow Plaid members Anna Brychan and Leticia Gonzalez. Marshall had been placed second on the party candidates list for the constituency and had announced her candidacy on International Women's Day the same year. Marshall is a member of the Senedd Legislation Committee.

=== Electoral history ===
| Election | Seat | Party | Votes | Percentage (%) | Result | Source |
|---|---|---|---|---|---|---|
| General, 2024 | Cardiff West | Plaid Cymru | 9,423 | 21.1 | Not elected | |
| Senedd, 2026 | Caerdydd Penarth | Plaid Cymru | 36,136 | 41 | Elected | |

== Personal life ==
Marshall lives in Canton, Cardiff, with her partner and daughter. She was pregnant with their daughter during her candidacy in the 2026 election. She has learnt Welsh for over four years, not being taught as a child.

In 2021, Marshall was convicted of driving under the influence in Swansea City Centre on 8 May, receiving a £300 fine and being disqualified from driving for 17 months. The conviction resurfaced during her 2024 parliamentary candidacy, and she issued a statement saying that at the time of the incident she had been suffering from post-traumatic stress disorder due to being a victim of stalking.

== See also ==
- 7th Senedd
- List of Plaid Cymru MSs
- List of female members of the Senedd
- List of Welsh-speaking politicians
