= Stefan Terlezki =

British politician (1927–2006)

Stefan Terlezki CBE
- Stefan in 2005

Member of Parliament for Cardiff West
- In office 9 June 1983 – 18 May 1987
- Preceded by: George Thomas
- Succeeded by: Hywel Rhodri Morgan

Personal details
- Born: 29 October 1927 Oleshiw, Poland (present day Ivano-Frankivsk Oblast, Ukraine)
- Died: 21 February 2006 (aged 78) Cardiff, Wales
- Party: Conservative

Stefan Terlezki, CBE (29 October 1927 – 21 February 2006) was a British Conservative politician who served as Member of Parliament (MP) for Cardiff West from 1983 to 1987. Terlezki was born in Oleshiw, a village near the town of Tlumach in what is now western Ukraine but was then part of Poland. Terlezki experienced life in both Nazi Germany, and the Soviet Union, which made him a powerful voice against totalitarian governments.

== Early life ==
Terlezki was brought up in the nearby farming community of Antonivka, where his first teacher at the village school was the Ukrainian poet Mariyka Pidhiryanka. His father Oleksa Terletskyj was a peasant farmer who also worked at a brickworks, where he organised a sit-in protest for shorter working hours. This led to a period of imprisonment by the Polish authorities.

== Wartime experiences ==
Western Ukraine was occupied by Russian forces in 1939 and then annexed to the Soviet Union. One of Terlezki's uncles was classified as a kulak after paying some neighbours to help with the harvest. He was arrested and deported to Siberia, a fate also suffered by several of Terlezki's cousins, who were students suspected of Ukrainian nationalism. Oleksa Terletskyj had initially welcomed the Communists and become Antonivka's village chairman but he later resigned.

After the German invasion in 1941, Stefan Terlezki was put to forced labour repairing a railway bridge over the river Dniester, damaged during the Red Army retreat. He also witnessed the murder of Jews thrown from the neighbouring road bridge by German soldiers. His father also sent him on errands to aid Jewish villagers by obtaining false baptism certificates for them.

== Slave labour ==
In 1942 the Germans went to Terlezki's school and drew up a list of children to be sent to the Third Reich as slave labour, including 14 year old Terlezki. After several weeks in holding camps, he became part of a shipment sent in railway cattle wagons to a slave distribution centre in Austria.

Most of his consignment of slaves were destined for factory work in Graz but the younger ones were put on sale at a slave market in Voitsberg, Styria. Terlezki was bought by Hansel Böhmer, who had been conscripted into Nazi Germany's Kriegsmarine and was looking for someone to replace him on his family's farm.

Terlezki worked on farms near Voitsberg between 1942 and 1945, interrupted only by a spell digging trenches for the German defences at Radkersburg and three weeks imprisonment after his arrest by the Gestapo for insubordination. (He had complained about the treatment of British Prisoners of War).

== Soviet invasion ==
In May 1945, Voitsberg was occupied by the Russians, who promised to repatriate slave labourers. Terlezki was in a large group who boarded a train thinking they would be taken home but who ended up in a camp in the eastern Austrian province of Burgenland. They were informed that they were being conscripted into the Red Army and would be sent to fight the Japanese.

== Escape to Britain ==
Terlezki escaped and fled back to Voitsberg, which in July 1945 became part of the British Zone of Occupation in Austria. He was sent to a Displaced Persons' camp in Villach, Carinthia, where he found work in the cookhouse at a British Army base. In 1948, he was allowed to emigrate to Britain, landing at Harwich, and was sent to work as a coalminer in Wales. His catering experience allowed him to find alternative work in the canteen of a miners' hostel. He eventually went into hotel management in the Welsh towns of Porthcawl and Swansea before running his own hotels in Aberystwyth and Cardiff.

== Politics ==
His political career began in 1968, when he became a Conservative member of Cardiff City Council for the South ward. He stood for Parliament in the two General Elections of 1974, unsuccessfully challenging James Callaghan in Cardiff South East. Terlezki gained greater public prominence by serving as chairman of his local football club, Cardiff City F.C., between 1975 and 1977. He attracted headlines by advocating the flogging of football hooligans, firmly establishing his reputation as a right-wing Conservative.

He refused to travel to the Soviet Union when Cardiff City played Dinamo Tbilisi in the European Cup Winners' Cup, he said he could not risk being sent to Siberia as a Red Army deserter. His father and sister were already in Siberia, sent there during Joseph Stalin's post-war purge of western Ukraine, where nationalist guerrillas fought the reimposition of Russian rule. (Terlezki's mother, Olena, had died in 1943).

== Parliament ==
He became MP for Cardiff West in the Conservative landslide of 1983. As in other constituencies, his Labour Party opponent suffered a loss of votes to the breakaway Social Democratic Party. In Parliament, Terlezki remained true to his right-wing reputation, introducing a bill to replace the May Day holiday with a day of celebration for Winston Churchill. However, he mostly concentrated on constituency work and secured an increase in his vote at the 1987 election (although a lower percentage). However, through the collapse in support for the Social Democrats, he lost his seat to Labour's Rhodri Morgan.

At Westminster, Terlezki also had the chance to do something about his father's plight. He persuaded the Foreign Secretary, Sir Geoffrey Howe, to raise the case with his Soviet counterpart, Andrei Gromyko. As a result, in October 1984, his father was flown to London for a monthlong reunion and subsequently allowed to return to Antonivka, where he died in 1986. Terlezki requested a visa to attend the funeral but it was not issued in time. However, he and his Welsh wife, Mary, together with their two daughters, later visited his home village as guests of the Soviet authorities.

== End of Communism ==
In 1989, Terlezki was appointed as the British Government's representative on the Council of Europe's Human Rights Committee. This was condemned by some Labour opposition MPs because of his previous advocacy of flogging, a view he later renounced. The Conservatives argued that his wartime experiences made him well suited to the role, which involved inspecting prison conditions in different countries, later including former Communist states.

When the Soviet Union collapsed in 1991, Terlezki became a critical supporter of newly independent Ukraine. He condemned the preservation of close ties with Russia, especially the leasing of military bases in Crimea and argued that more should be done to promote the Ukrainian language and to discourage the use of Russian. In 2003, he visited the European Parliament to press the case for eventual Ukrainian membership of the European Union.

In 2002, Terlezki took part in a television documentary about his life story and returned to Voitsberg, where he was reunited with Hansel Böhmer's niece. He published his memoirs, From War to Westminster in 2005. He died on 21 February 2006, aged 78.

Parliament of the United Kingdom
| Preceded by George Thomas | Member of Parliament for Cardiff West; 1983–1987 | Succeeded by Rhodri Morgan |
