= Prestatyn High School =

- Ysgol Uwchradd Prestatyn

Location
- 2 Princes Avenue; Prestatyn, Denbighshire, LL19 8RS; Wales; 53.3268°N 3.4064°W

Information
- Motto: "Community achieving together"
- Religious affiliation: Mixed
- Local authority: Denbighshire
- Headteacher: Neil Foley
- Staff: 260
- Gender: Mixed
- Age: 11 to 18
- Enrolment: 1,800
- Houses: Planets of the Solar System
- Colour: Maroon
- Website: http://www.prestatynhighschool.net/

Prestatyn High School is the only secondary school in the town of Prestatyn, and one of 9 secondary schools in the entire county of Denbighshire. It is one of the largest schools in the region and the country with over 2,000 pupils and around 200-300 staff. The school is taught through the English medium.

== Alumni ==
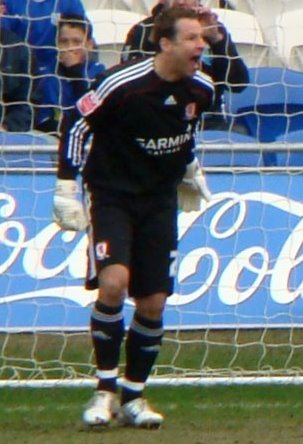
Danny Coyne playing for Middlesbrough (6 March 2010)

- Danny Coyne
- Will Owen
- Andy Pollitt
- Sam Wainwright
- Alex Barros-Curtis
