= Sam Wainwright =

Welsh rugby union player (born 1998)

- Born: 7 May 1998 (age 28) Bodelwyddan, Wales
- Height: 1.88 m (6 ft 2 in)
- Weight: 121 kg (19 st 1 lb)
- School: Prestatyn High School, Coleg Llandrillo

Rugby union career
- Position: Tighthead Prop
Amateur team(s)
Years	Team	Apps	(Points)
- RGC 1404
Senior career
Years	Team	Apps	(Points)
2019–2022	Saracens	27	(0)
2022–2025	Scarlets	46	(0)
2025–	Cardiff Rugby	7	(0)
International career
Years	Team	Apps	(Points)
2018	Wales U20	2	(0)
2022–	Wales	4	(0)
- Correct as of 18 November 2022

Sam Wainwright (born 7 May 1998) is a Welsh rugby union player who plays as a prop for United Rugby Championship club the Scarlets. He is a Wales international, and has also appeared for the U20 team.

== Club career ==
Wainwright began his career at local club Rhyl and District RFC before joining the North Wales regional side RGC 1404. He was signed by Saracens in May 2019, and made his debut against Wasps in the Premiership Rugby Cup on 21 September 2019.

On 18 November 2022, Wainwright joined the Scarlets on a short-term contract, until the end of the 2022–2023 season. Wainwright made his first appearance for the Scarlets on the 2023 New Year’s derby win over the Dragons.

Wainwright signed a contract extension with the Scarlets on 20 April 2023, along with fellow prop Kemsley Mathias.

== International career ==
Wainwright represented Wales U20.

He received his first call-up to the senior Wales side in June 2022, when he was added to the squad for the summer tour to South Africa in place of the injured Leon Brown. Wainwright came off the bench in the second test to make his debut, with Wales winning for the first time on South African soil.

Wainwright was selected in the Wales squad for the 2022 end-of-year rugby union internationals, and came off the bench against Georgia.

Wainwright was called up to replace Keiron Assiratti ahead of the 2026 Six Nations.

== Personal life ==
As a child, Sam Wainwright attended Prestatyn High School before attending Coleg Llandrillo.
