= Pie bird =

Hollow ceramic device used to support or vent pies

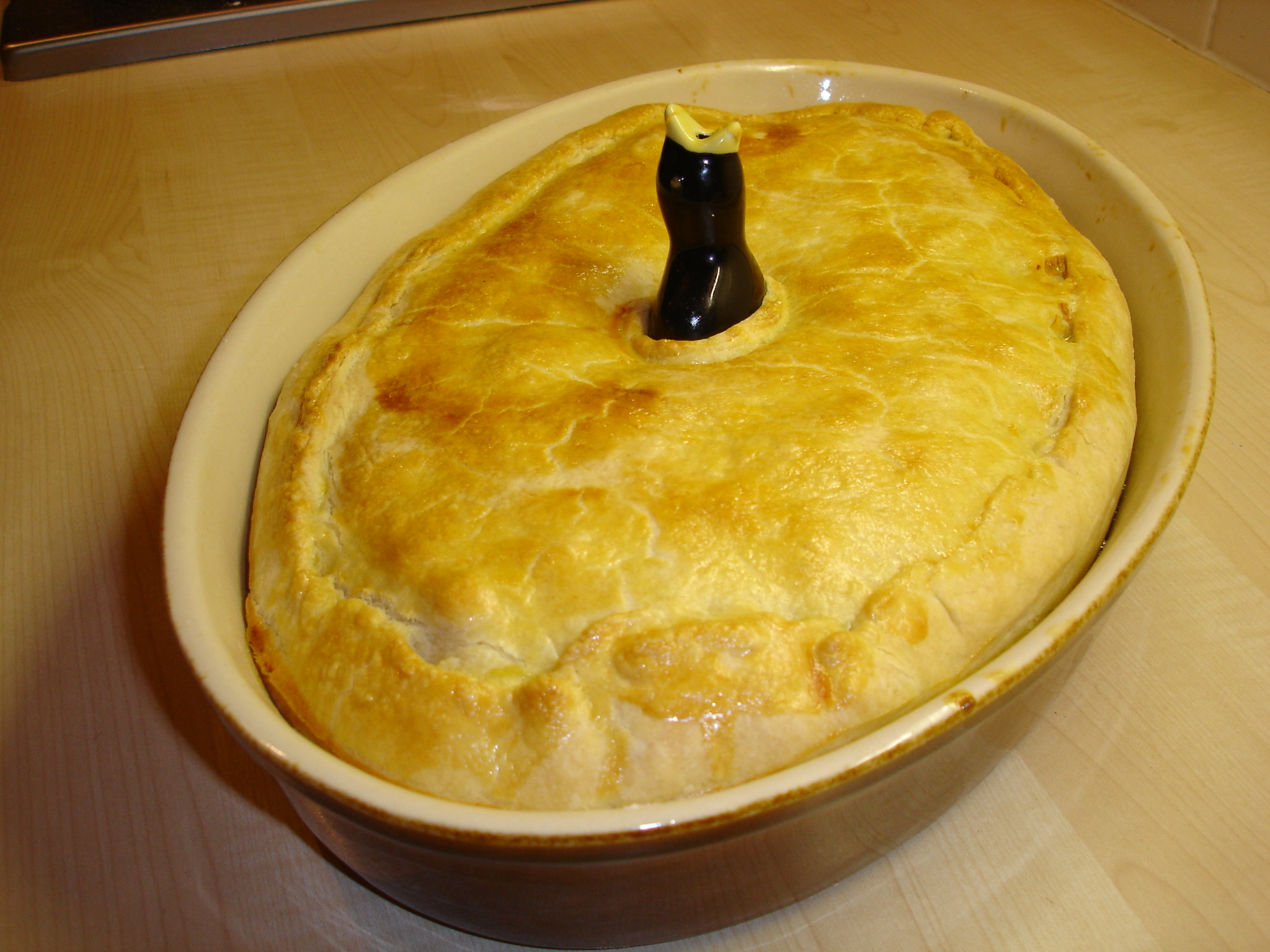
A chicken pie with a traditional pie bird

A pie bird, pie vent, pie whistle, pie funnel, or pie chimney is a hollow ceramic device, originating in Europe, shaped like a funnel, chimney, or upstretched bird with open beak used for supporting or venting a pie. Some devices whistle when releasing steam. Occasionally other whimsical shapes are used.

== History ==
Pies with top crusts need to be vented to allow steam to escape. Funnel-style steam vents have been placed in the center of fruit and meat pies during cooking since Victorian times; bird shapes came later. The bird shape was likely inspired by the "four and twenty blackbirds baked in a pie" from the nursery rhyme "Sing a Song of Sixpence"; that "the birds began to sing" suggests a means for a vent.

Pie funnels were used to prevent pie filling from boiling up and leaking through the crust by allowing steam to escape. They also supported the pastry crust so it did not sag in the middle and were occasionally known as "crustholders".

The traditional inverted funnels, with arches on the bottom for steam to enter, were followed by ceramic birds and then other designs. Creigiau Pottery of South Wales produced a 'Welsh Pie Dragon' in copper lustreware. Later they became popular as gifts and are now collector's items.
