= North Stack =

Island in Anglesey, Wales, United Kingdom

Native name: Ynys Arw
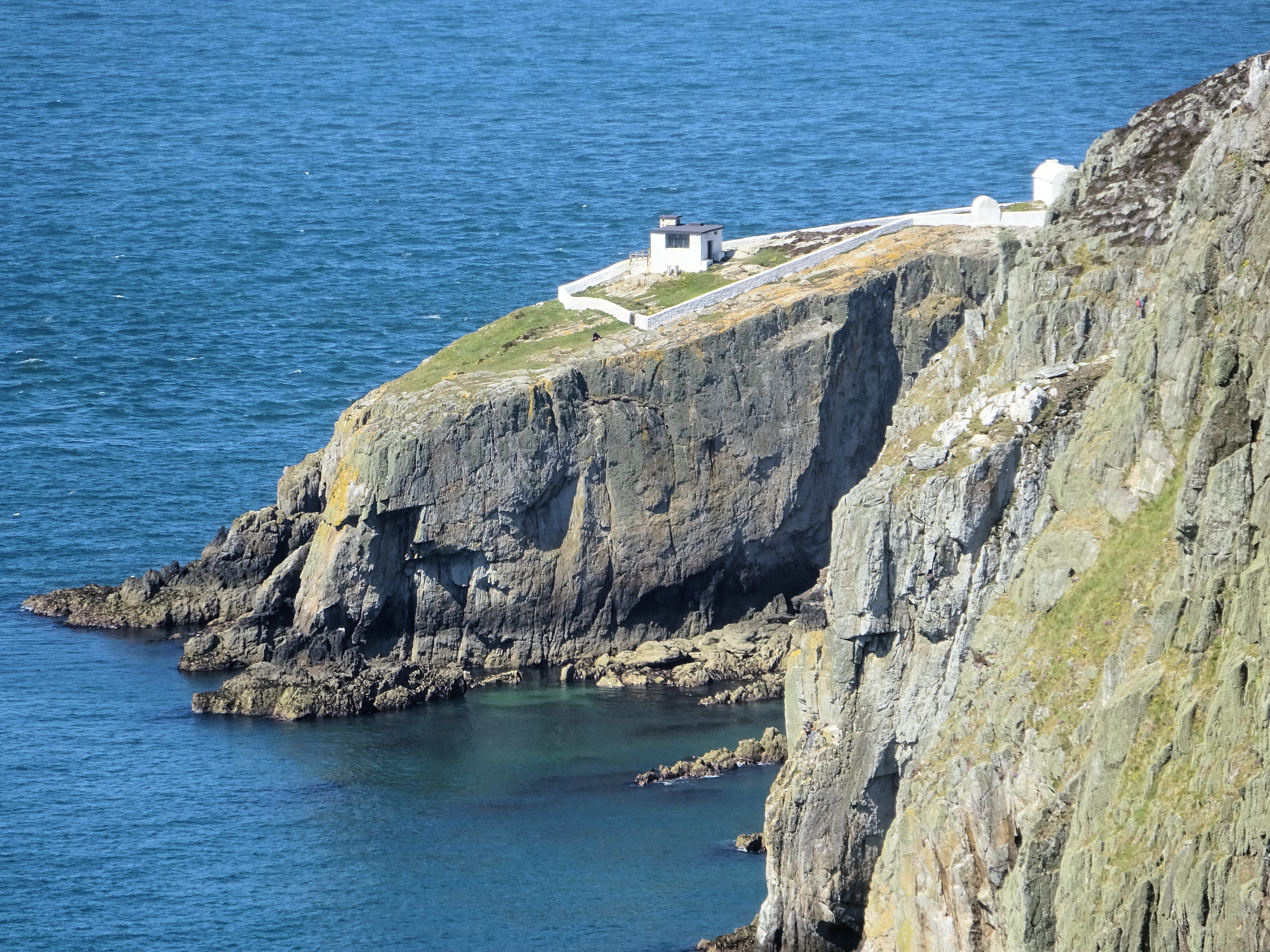
- North Stack (centre), with a building from the defunct fog warning station (right)

- Location within Anglesey

Geography
- Location: Anglesey, Wales
- Coordinates: 53.333332°N 4.683333°W

Administration
- Wales
- County: Anglesey

Demographics
- Population: 0 (uninhabited)

North Stack (Welsh: Ynys Arw, meaning "rugged island") is a small island situated just off Holy Island on the north-west coast of Anglesey. The area has been an important location in the development of traditional climbing in Britain and has several notable classic, and also extreme, climbing routes.

== Description ==
North Stack is the site of a redundant fog warning station, comprising a number of buildings, including the Trinity House Magazine, built-in 1861, where shells for the warning cannon were stored. These buildings now house a bird-watching observatory, giving a view of South Stack lighthouse across Gogarth Bay, and the studio of artist Philippa Jacobs.

North Stack, or Gogarth North Stack, can also refer to the headland opposite the island.

== Rock climbing ==
The Precambrian quartzite cliffs of this headland, including the North Stack Walls and Wen Zawn, are a well-regarded area for rock climbs in Britain, and contain important traditional climbing routes such as A Dream of White Horses (HVS 4c, Ed Drummond and Dave Pearce, 1968), The Cad (E6 6a, Ron Fawcett, 1978), Skinhead Moonstomp (E6 6b, Andy Pollitt, 1986), The Bells, The Bells! (E7 6b, John Redhead, 1980), Conan the Librarian (E7 6b, Johnny Dawes, 1986), and The Hollow Man (E8 6b, Andy Pollitt, 1988).

== Crash site ==
The stack was the site of a crash of a B-24 bomber of the US Eighth Air Force on 22 December 1944 that killed the eight crew on board.

== Gallery ==
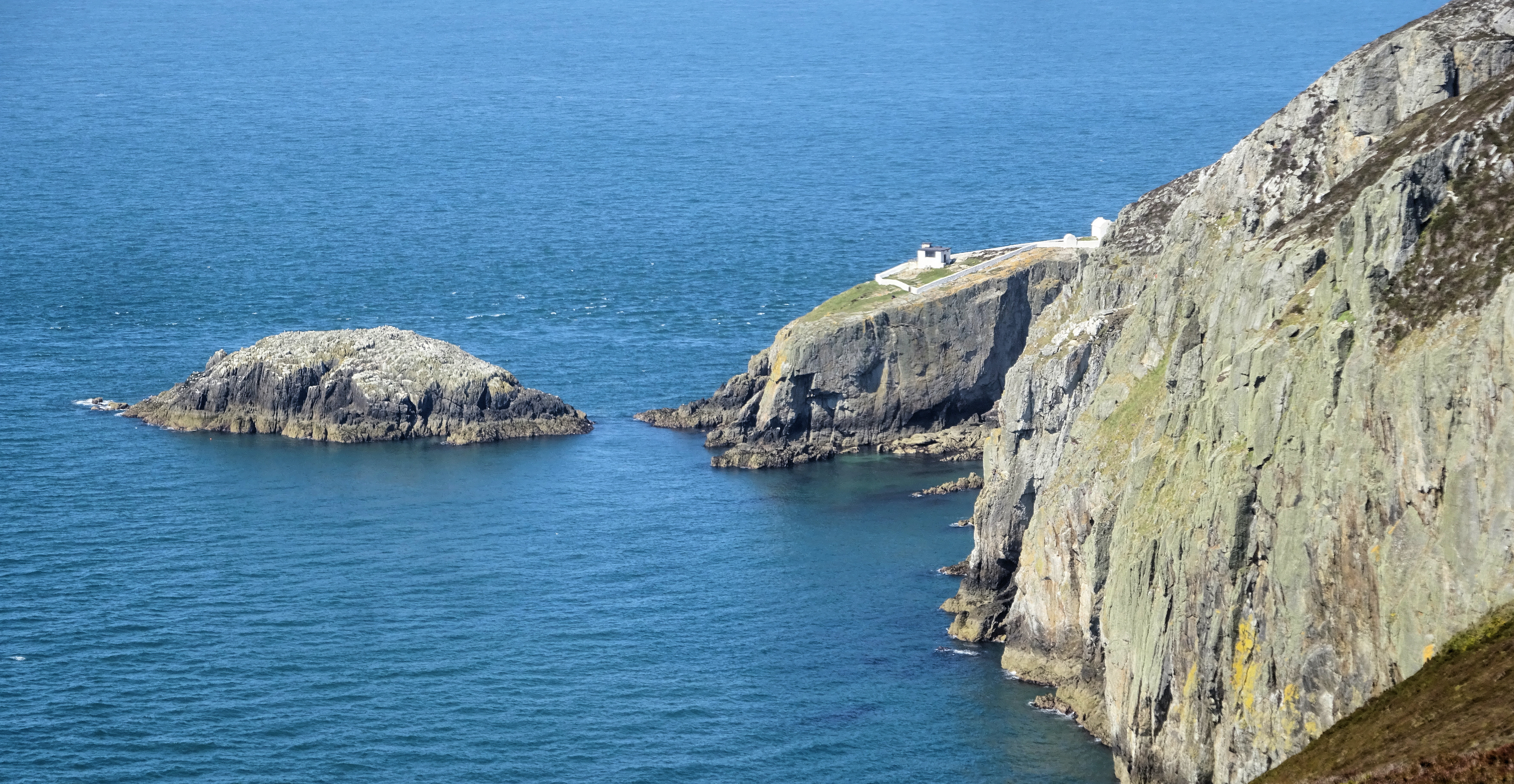
The main island of 'Ynys Arw' which gave its name to the peninsula (or headland)

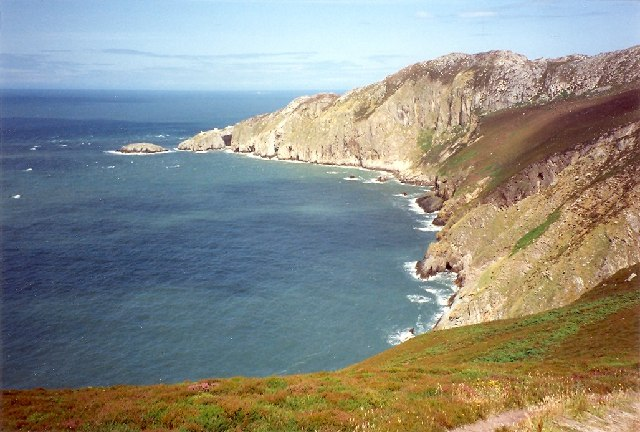
North Stack: the small island at the end of Gogarth Bay and the headland opposite

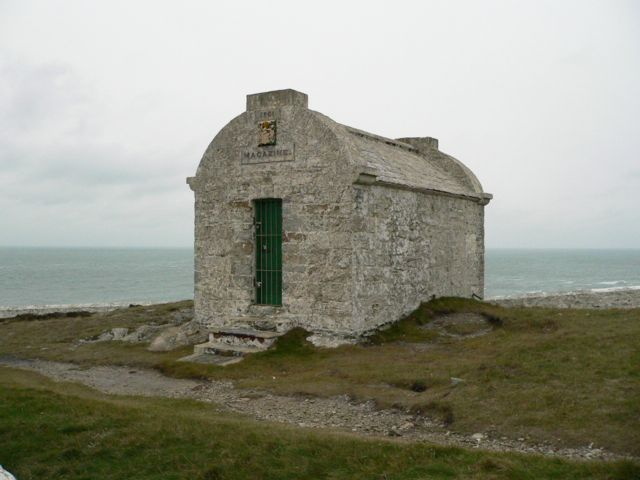
Trinity House Magazine, North Stack
