= Andy Pollitt =

British rock climber (1963–2019)

Personal information
- Born: 26 October 1963 Prestatyn, Wales.
- Died: 13 November 2019 (aged 56) Melbourne, Australia.
- Education: Prestatyn High School

Climbing career
- Type of climber: Traditional climbing, Sport climbing, Free solo climbing
- Highest grade: Redpoint: 8b+ (5.14a); Onsight/Flash: E7 6c
- First ascents: Hollow Man (E8 6b, 1986); Knockin' on Heaven's Door (E9 6c, 1988)
- Known for: Pioneer professional British rock climber

Robert Andrew Pollitt (26 October 1963 – 13 November 2019) was a British rock climber who was one of the most prominent traditional climbers and sport climbers of the late 1980s and early 1990s. In 1992, after having successfully repeated Punks in the Gym in Australia, the world's first-ever 8b+ (5.14a) graded sport climbing routes, he quit climbing and permanently emigrated to Australia. In 2016, Pollitt published an autobiography, titled Punk in the Gym. He died from a cerebral aneurysm on 13 November 2019.

== Early life ==
Andy Pollitt was born in Prestatyn, North Wales, on 26 October 1963. His father was an actor who had small parts in Z-Cars, Coronation Street, and Doctor Who before eventually leaving the family. Pollitt attended Prestatyn High School, which had an indoor climbing wall that Pollitt took to with enthusiasm, including school trips to nearby crags organized by his climbing teacher-mentor, Andy Boorman.

== Climbing career ==
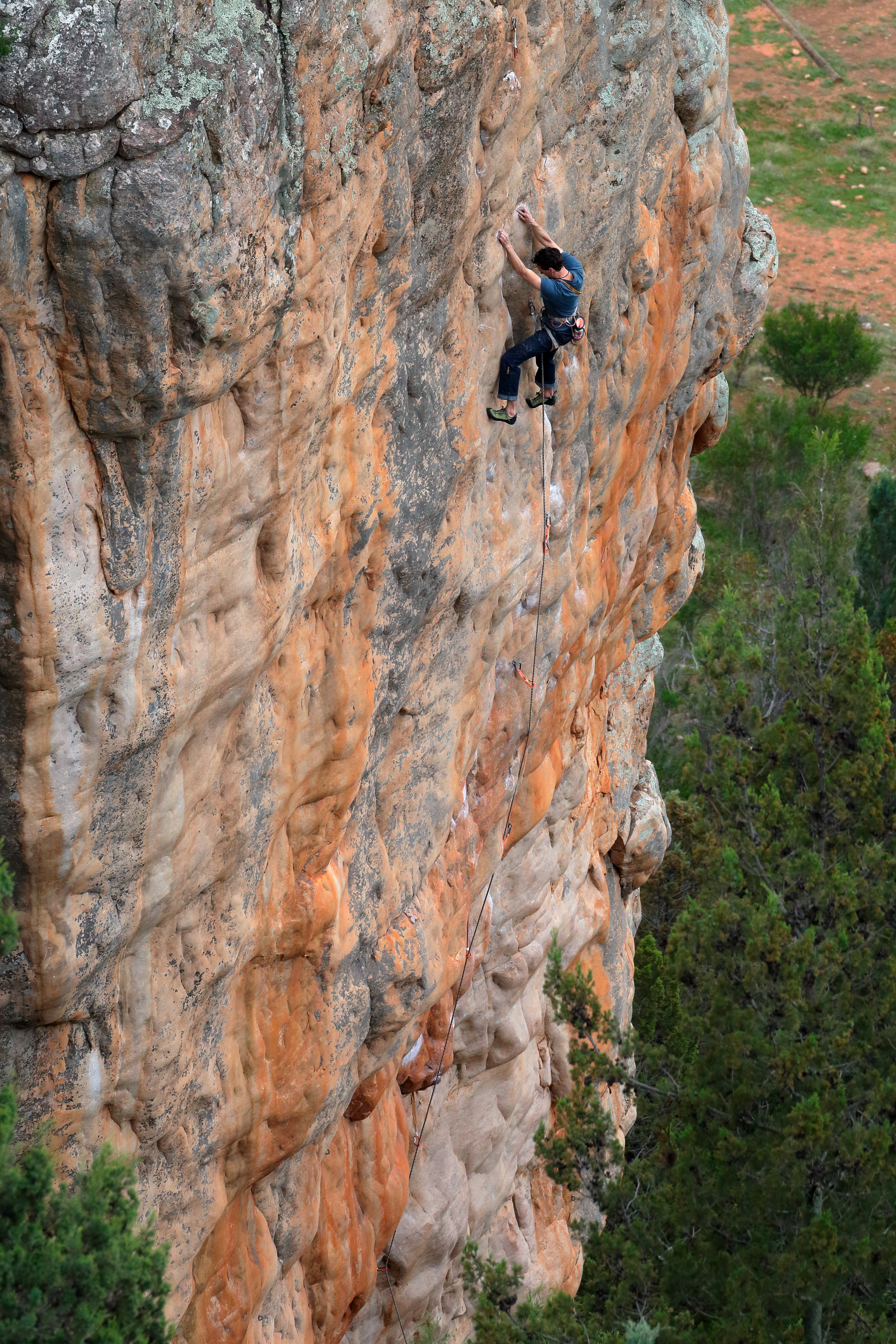
Climber nearing the top of Punks in the Gym 32 8b+ (5.14a)

In the mid-1980s, Pollitt rose to prominence in Britain as a leading traditional climber, completing over 350 climbs, with important first ascents such as The Hollow Man (E8 6b, 1986), and Knockin' on Heaven's Door (E9 6c, 1988). Pollitt also repeated some of the most feared routes of the time including onsighting the second ascent of John Redhead's chop route, The Bells The Bells!, Britain's first E7-climb, in 1986.

In the early 1990s, Pollitt spent 44 days, spread over a two-year period, working on the sport climbing route, Punks in the Gym, the first-ever 8b+ (5.14a) graded route, which had been freed by Wolfgang Gullich in 1985. On 5 May 1992, Pollitt eventually succeeded and immediately decided to retire from climbing,

== Legacy ==
Pollitt was renowned for the boldness of his routes and also for his distinctive fashion; he wore his hair long and sported bright, tight lycra, and often climbed bare-chested, giving him a "rockstar" status in climbing.

Pollitt was part of the mid-1980s wave of semi-professional rock climbers in Britain that followed on from Ron Fawcett – an idol of Pollitt's – who led the transition from traditional climbing to sport climbing in Britain and abroad; others included Jerry Moffatt, and Ben Moon.

== Personal life ==
In 1993, Pollitt permanently moved to Australia where he worked as a successful and prominent rope access technician in Melbourne. Though Pollitt was considered a notorious ladies-man, he never married.

In the years before his death, Pollitt returned to his climbing past, publishing an autobiography under the title Punk in the Gym in 2016. In the book, Pollitt revealed that he suffered from bipolar disorder, and also talked about his long-standing addiction to alcohol; something which had held him back throughout his climbing career.

In November 2019, Pollitt suffered a cerebral aneurysm in a bar in Melbourne and never regained consciousness; he died on 13 November 2019.

== Bibliography ==
- Punk in the Gym, 2016, Vertebrate Publishing. ISBN 978-1910240694.

== Filmography ==
- Documentary on 1980s British sport climbing: Brown, Nick (director) (2019). Statement of Youth (Motion picture). UKC.

== Notable ascents ==
- 1984: Skinhead Moonstomp (E6 6b), Gogarth North Stack. First free ascent. One of the classics of Welsh climbing, and Pollitt's favourite FFA.
- 1986: The Bells, The Bells! (E7 6c), Gogarth North Stack. Second ascent, and first onsight ascent, of John Redhead's legendary chop route.
- 1986: The Hollow Man (E8 6b), Gogarth North Stack. First free ascent and the first-ever E8 in Wales; seconded by Johnny Dawes.
- 1987: Boot Boys (8a+), Raven Tor, Dovedale. First free ascent of a route that had only been aid climbed just two days earlier.
- 1988: Knockin' on Heaven's Door (E9 6c), Curbar Edge. First free ascent and the first-ever E9 on gritstone; considered "a last great problem".
- 1988: Thormen's Moth (8a), Thor's Cave, Peak District. First free ascent of an aid climbing roof route; Pollitt considered it one of his best lines.
- 1992 (5 May): Punks in the Gym (8b+), Mount Arapiles. Sixth ascent of the world's first-ever 8b+ (5.14a); Pollitt retired from climbing that day.

== See also ==
- Johnny Dawes
- Ron Fawcett
- Jerry Moffatt
