= Cardiff West (UK Parliament constituency) =

UK Parliament constituency (1950–)

Coordinates: 51.486°N 3.214°W

- Borough constituency for the House of Commons
- Interactive map of boundaries from 2024
- Location within Wales
- Preserved county: South Glamorgan
- Population: 91,027 (2011 census)
- Electorate: 73,947 (March 2020)

Current constituency
- Created: 1950
- Member of Parliament: Alex Barros-Curtis (Labour)
- Seats: One
- Created from: Cardiff Central

Overlaps
- Senedd: Caerdydd Penarth

Cardiff West (Welsh: Gorllewin Caerdydd) is a constituency represented in the House of Commons of the UK Parliament since 2024 by Alex Barros-Curtis of the Labour Party.

The constituency retained its name and gained a ward as part of the 2023 review of Westminster constituencies and under the June 2023 final recommendations of the Boundary Commission for Wales for the 2024 general election.

== Boundaries ==
Until 2024 Cardiff West was entirely within the boundaries of the City of Cardiff, though in 2024 (as a result of the 2023 Review of UK constituencies) it gained the Rhondda Cynon Taf ward of Pontyclun.

1950–1974: The County Borough of Cardiff wards of Canton, Ely, Grangetown, Llandaff, and Riverside.

1974–1983: The County Borough of Cardiff wards of Canton, Ely, Llandaff, Grangetown, Plasmawr, and Riverside.

1983–2010: The City of Cardiff wards of Caerau, Canton, Ely, Fairwater, Llandaff, Radyr and St Fagans, and Riverside.

2010–2024: The City of Cardiff wards of Caerau, Canton, Creigiau and St Fagans, Ely, Fairwater, Llandaff, Pentyrch, Radyr, and Riverside.

2024–present: As above with the addition of the Rhondda Cynon Taf ward of Pontyclun (as it existed on 1 December 2020), transferred primarily from Pontypridd.

Following local government boundary reviews which came into effect in May 2022, the constituency now comprises the following from the 2024 general election:

- The City and County of Cardiff wards of Caerau, Canton, Ely, Fairwater, Llandaff, Pentyrch and St Fagans, Radyr, and Riverside.
- The County Borough of Rhondda Cynon Taf wards of Pontyclun Central, Pontyclun East, and Pontyclun West (part).

Until 2024 Cardiff West was entirely within the boundaries of the City of Cardiff.

== Constituency profile ==
Population areas within the constituency include Riverside, Pontcanna, St Fagans and Ely. There are some Conservative and Plaid Cymru-leaning areas in the north of the seat such as Creigiau and St Fagans, Pentyrch and Radyr, but the bulk of the seat comprises districts towards the centre of Cardiff such as Caerau, Canton, Ely and Riverside which are very strongly Labour.

== History ==
A traditionally safe Labour seat, represented for 33 years by George Thomas (who became Speaker in 1976 and was re-elected without party affiliation in 1979). It has returned a Conservative only once, in the Tories' landslide year of 1983, when Stefan Terlezki became the MP.

Labour regained the seat at the next general election in 1987, when Rhodri Morgan was elected. After the creation of the Welsh Assembly Government, Morgan stepped down from his Westminster seat in 2001 to serve as leader of Welsh Labour and First Minister for Wales. Kevin Brennan retained the seat for Labour on Morgan's retirement from Westminster politics. Following the announcement of the date of the 2024 general election Brennan announced his retirement from politics.

== Members of Parliament ==
Election	Member	Party
1950	George Thomas	Labour
1976	George Thomas	Speaker
1983	Stefan Terlezki	Conservative
1987	Rhodri Morgan	Labour
2001	Kevin Brennan	Labour
2024	Alex Barros-Curtis	Labour

== Elections ==
=== Elections in the 1950s ===
General election 1950: Cardiff West
Party	Candidate	Votes	%	±%
Labour	George Thomas	27,200	54.3	N/A
Conservative	Charles Stuart Hallinan	22,893	45.7	N/A
Majority		4,307	8.6	N/A
Turnout		50,093	82.2	N/A
Registered electors		60,918		
Labour win (new seat)				

General election 1951: Cardiff West
Party	Candidate	Votes	%	±%
Labour	George Thomas	28,995	55.1	+0.8
Conservative	Adrian Lincoln Hallinan	23,595	44.9	−0.8
Majority		5,400	10.2	+1.6
Turnout		62,528	84.1	+1.9
Registered electors		62,528		
Labour hold		Swing		

General election 1955: Cardiff West
Party	Candidate	Votes	%	±%
Labour	George Thomas	26,042	55.3	+0.2
Conservative	Emrys Simons	21,080	44.7	−0.2
Majority		4,962	10.6	+0.4
Turnout		47,122	76.7	−7.4
Registered electors		61,446		
Labour hold		Swing		

General election 1959: Cardiff West
Party	Candidate	Votes	%	±%
Labour	George Thomas	25,390	53.3	−2.0
Conservative	Adrian Lincoln Hallinan	22,258	46.7	+2.0
Majority		3,132	6.6	−4.0
Turnout		47,648	80.1	+3.4
Registered electors		59,524		
Labour hold		Swing		

=== Elections in the 1960s ===
General election 1964: Cardiff West
Party	Candidate	Votes	%	±%
Labour	George Thomas	25,998	59.2	+5.9
Conservative	Keith T Flynn	17,941	40.8	−5.9
Majority		8,057	18.4	+11.8
Turnout		43,949	76.4	−3.7
Registered electors		57,511		
Labour hold		Swing		

General election 1966: Cardiff West
Party	Candidate	Votes	%	±%
Labour	George Thomas	26,139	61.0	+1.8
Conservative	Sidney William Doxsey	16,714	39.0	−1.8
Majority		9,425	22.0	+3.6
Turnout		42,853	75.1	−1.3
Registered electors		57,088		
Labour hold		Swing		

=== Elections in the 1970s ===
General election 1970: Cardiff West
Party	Candidate	Votes	%	±%
Labour	George Thomas	21,655	49.8	−11.2
Conservative	Robert C. Williams	15,878	36.5	−2.5
Plaid Cymru	Dafydd Hughes	4,378	10.1	N/A
Liberal	Stephen Robert Charles Wanhill	1,594	3.7	N/A
Majority		5,777	13.3	−8.7
Turnout		43,505	71.0	−4.1
Registered electors		61,322		
Labour hold		Swing		

General election February 1974: Cardiff West
Party	Candidate	Votes	%	±%
Labour	George Thomas	16,712	44.0	−5.8
Conservative	G J Neale	13,366	35.2	−1.3
Liberal	Michael James	5,812	15.3	+11.6
Plaid Cymru	D Hughes	2,093	5.5	−4.6
Majority		3,346	8.8	−4.5
Turnout		43,505	73.6	+2.6
Registered electors		51,626		
Labour hold		Swing		

General election October 1974: Cardiff West
Party	Candidate	Votes	%	±%
Labour	George Thomas	18,153	50.0	+6.0
Conservative	W F Dunn	11,481	31.6	−3.6
Liberal	Michael James	4,669	12.9	−2.4
Plaid Cymru	D Hughes	2,008	5.5	±0.0
Majority		6,672	18.4	+9.6
Turnout		36,311	69.7	−3.9
Registered electors		52,083		
Labour hold		Swing		

General election 1979: Cardiff West
Party	Candidate	Votes	%	±%
Speaker	George Thomas	27,035	85.6	+35.6
Plaid Cymru	A Ogwen	3,272	10.4	+4.9
National Front	C Gibbon	1,287	4.1	N/A
Majority		23,763	75.2	+56.8
Turnout		31,594	60.8	−8.9
Registered electors		51,982		
Speaker hold		Swing		

=== Elections in the 1980s ===
General election 1983: Cardiff West
Party	Candidate	Votes	%	±%
Conservative	Stefan Terlezki	15,472	38.0	N/A
Labour	David Seligman	13,698	33.6	N/A
SDP	Jeffrey Thomas	10,388	25.5	N/A
Plaid Cymru	Meurig Parri	848	2.1	−8.3
Ecology	Graham Jones	352	0.9	N/A
Majority		1,774	4.4	N/A
Turnout		40,758	69.6	+8.8
Registered electors		58,538		
Conservative gain from Speaker		Swing		

General election 1987: Cardiff West
Party	Candidate	Votes	%	±%
Labour	Rhodri Morgan	20,329	45.5	+11.9
Conservative	Stefan Terlezki	16,284	36.5	−1.5
SDP	Robert Drake	7,300	16.4	−9.1
Plaid Cymru	Peter Keelan	736	1.7	−0.4
Majority		4,045	9.0	N/A
Turnout		44,649	77.8	+8.2
Registered electors		57,363		
Labour gain from Conservative		Swing	+6.7	

=== Elections in the 1990s ===
General election 1992: Cardiff West
Party	Candidate	Votes	%	±%
Labour	Rhodri Morgan	24,306	53.2	+7.7
Conservative	Michael J. Prior	15,015	32.9	−3.6
Liberal Democrats	Jacqui Gasson	5,002	10.9	−5.5
Plaid Cymru	Penni M. Bestic	1,177	2.6	+0.9
Natural Law	Andrew E. Harding	184	0.4	N/A
Majority		9,291	20.3	+11.3
Turnout		45,684	77.5	−0.3
Registered electors		58,898		
Labour hold		Swing	+5.6	

General election 1997: Cardiff West
Party	Candidate	Votes	%	±%
Labour	Rhodri Morgan	24,297	60.3	+7.1
Conservative	Simon Hoare	8,669	21.5	−11.4
Liberal Democrats	Jacqui Gasson	4,366	10.8	−0.1
Plaid Cymru	Gwenllian Carr	1,949	4.8	+2.2
Referendum	Trefor Johns	996	2.5	N/A
Majority		15,628	38.8	+18.5
Turnout		40,277	69.2	−8.3
Registered electors		58,244		
Labour hold		Swing	+9.2	

=== Elections in the 2000s ===
General election 2001: Cardiff West
Party	Candidate	Votes	%	±%
Labour	Kevin Brennan	18,594	54.6	−5.7
Conservative	Andrew Davies	7,273	21.3	−0.2
Liberal Democrats	Jacqui Gasson	4,458	13.1	+2.3
Plaid Cymru	Delme Bowen	3,296	9.7	+4.9
UKIP	Joyce Jenking	462	1.4	N/A
Majority		11,321	33.3	−5.5
Turnout		34,083	58.4	−10.8
Registered electors		58,348		
Labour hold		Swing	-2.8	

General election 2005: Cardiff West
Party	Candidate	Votes	%	±%
Labour	Kevin Brennan	15,729	45.5	−9.1
Conservative	Simon Baker	7,562	21.9	+0.6
Liberal Democrats	Alison Goldsworthy	6,060	17.5	+4.4
Plaid Cymru	Neil McEvoy	4,316	12.5	+2.8
UKIP	Joe Callan	727	2.1	+0.7
Rainbow Dream Ticket	Catherine Taylor-Dawson	167	0.5	N/A
Majority		8,167	23.6	−9.7
Turnout		34,561	57.7	−0.7
Registered electors		59,931		
Labour hold		Swing	−4.8	

=== Elections in the 2010s ===
General election 2010: Cardiff West
Party	Candidate	Votes	%	±%
Labour	Kevin Brennan	16,893	41.2	−3.6
Conservative	Angela Jones-Evans	12,143	29.6	+7.0
Liberal Democrats	Rachael Hitchinson	7,186	17.5	+0.5
Plaid Cymru	Mohammed Islam	2,868	7.0	−5.9
UKIP	Michael Hennessey	1,117	2.7	+0.6
Green	Jake Griffiths	750	1.8	N/A
Majority		4,750	11.6	−12.0
Turnout		40,957	65.2	+7.0
Registered electors		62,787		
Labour hold		Swing	−5.3	

General election 2015: Cardiff West
Party	Candidate	Votes	%	±%
Labour	Kevin Brennan	17,803	40.7	−0.5
Conservative	James Taghdissian	11,014	25.2	−4.4
Plaid Cymru	Neil McEvoy	6,096	13.9	+6.9
UKIP	Brian Morris	4,923	11.2	+8.5
Liberal Democrats	Cadan ap Tomos	2,069	4.7	−12.8
Green	Ken Barker	1,704	3.9	+2.1
TUSC	Helen Jones	183	0.4	N/A
Rejected ballots		113		
Majority		6,789	15.5	+3.9
Turnout		43,792	65.6	+0.4
Registered electors		66,762		
Labour hold		Swing	+1.9	

Of the 113 rejected ballots:

- 80 were either unmarked or it was uncertain who the vote was for.
- 30 voted for more than one candidate.
- 3 had writing or a mark by which the voter could be identified.

General election 2017: Cardiff West
Party	Candidate	Votes	%	±%
Labour	Kevin Brennan	26,425	56.7	+16.0
Conservative	Matt Smith	13,874	29.8	+4.6
Plaid Cymru	Michael Deem	4,418	9.5	−4.4
Liberal Democrats	Alex Meredith	1,214	2.6	−2.1
UKIP	Richard Lewis	698	1.5	−9.7
Rejected ballots		89		
Majority		12,551	26.9	+11.4
Turnout		46,629	69.8	+4.2
Registered electors		66,775		
Labour hold		Swing	+5.7	

Of the 89 rejected ballots:

- 66 were either unmarked or it was uncertain who the vote was for.
- 23 voted for more than one candidate.

General election 2019: Cardiff West
Party	Candidate	Votes	%	±%
Labour	Kevin Brennan	23,908	51.8	−4.9
Conservative	Carolyn Webster	12,922	28.0	−1.8
Plaid Cymru	Boyd Clack	3,864	8.4	−1.1
Liberal Democrats	Callum Littlemore	2,731	5.9	+3.3
Brexit Party	Nick Mullins	1,619	3.5	N/A
Green	David Griffin	1,133	2.5	N/A
Rejected ballots		144		
Majority		10,986	23.8	−3.1
Turnout		46,177	67.4	−2.4
Registered electors		68,508		
Labour hold		Swing	-1.6	

Of the 144 rejected ballots:

- 115 were either unmarked or it was uncertain who the vote was for.
- 28 voted for more than one candidate.
- 1 had writing or mark by which the voter could be identified.

2019 notional result (Note: Estimate of the 2019 general election result as if the revised boundaries recommended under the 2023 boundary review were in place)
Party	Vote	%
Labour	26,051	50.2
Conservative	15,505	29.9
Plaid Cymru	4,419	8.5
Liberal Democrats	2,749	5.3
Brexit Party	1,917	3.7
Green Party	1,141	2.2
Independent	159	0.3
Majority	10,546	20.3
Turnout	51,941	70.2
Electorate	73,947	

=== Elections in the 2020s ===
General election 2024: Cardiff West
Party	Candidate	Votes	%	±%
Labour	Alex Barros-Curtis	16,442	36.7	−13.5
Plaid Cymru	Kiera Marshall	9,423	21.1	+12.6
Conservative	James Hamblin	6,835	15.3	−14.6
Reform	Peter Hopkins	5,626	12.6	+8.9
Green	Jess Ryan	3,157	7.1	+4.9
Liberal Democrats	Manda Rigby	1,921	4.3	−1.0
Propel	Neil McEvoy	1,041	2.3	N/A
Independent	John Ernest Urquhart	241	0.5	N/A
Heritage	Sean Wesley	71	0.2	N/A
Majority		7,019	15.6	−8.2
Turnout		44,757	59.0	−10.9
Registered electors		75,473		
Labour hold		Swing	▼13.0	

The selection of Barros-Curtis as Labour candidate, with minimal input from local party members, was criticised. He is the Labour Party's executive director of legal affairs. Barros-Curtis had no connection to the Cardiff area, though had grown up in North Wales.

== See also ==
- Cardiff West (Senedd constituency)
- List of parliamentary constituencies in South Glamorgan
- List of UK Parliament constituencies in Wales

== Notes ==
Parliament of the United Kingdom
Preceded by Wirral	Constituency represented by the speaker 1976–1983	Succeeded by Croydon North East
