= Alex Barros-Curtis =

British politician

Alex Barros-Curtis MP
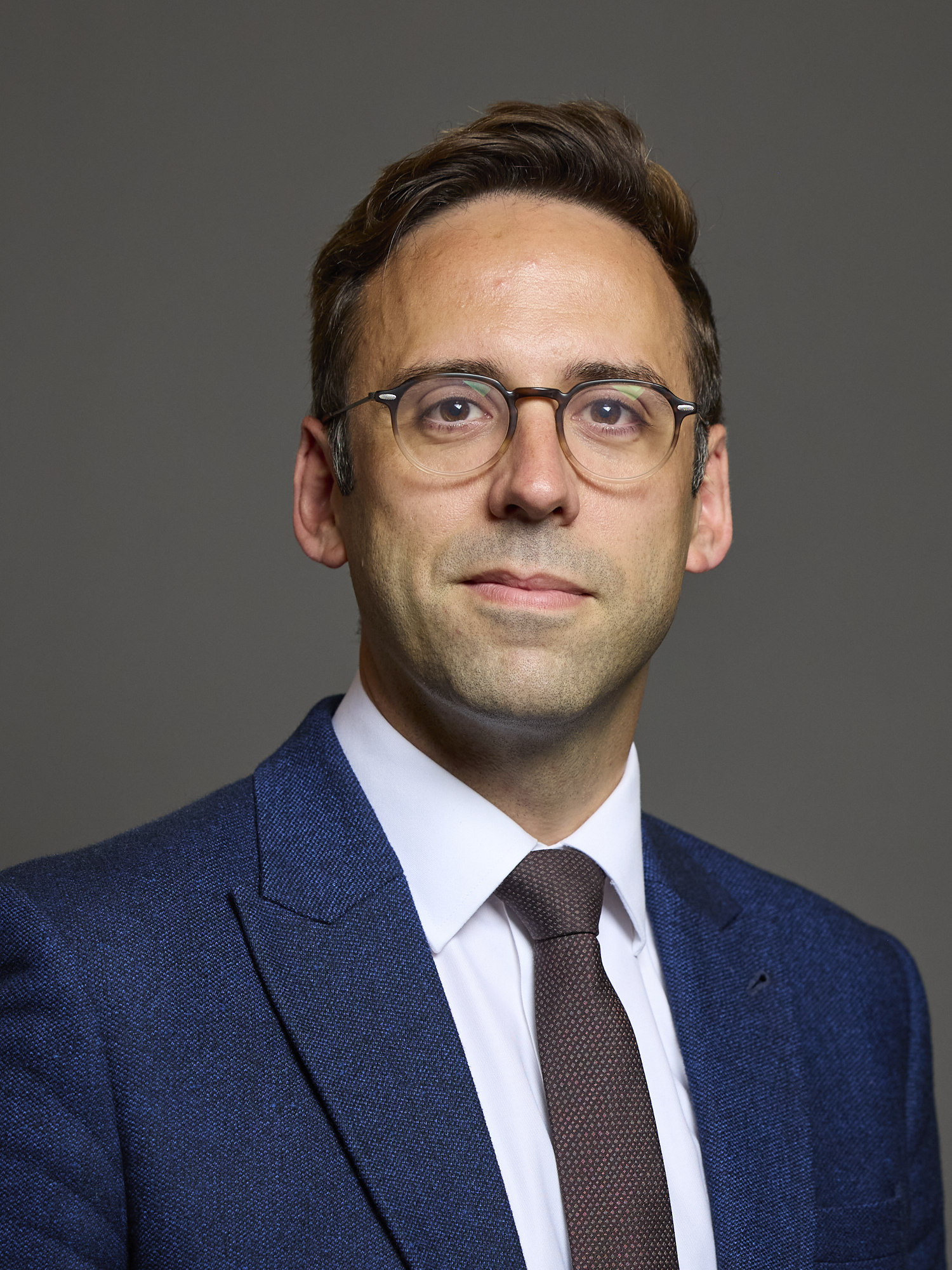
- Official portrait, 2024

Member of Parliament for Cardiff West
- Incumbent
- Assumed office 4 July 2024
- Preceded by: Kevin Brennan
- Majority: 7,019 (15.6%)

Personal details
- Born: Alexandre Samuel Barros-Curtis; 1986 (age 39–40)
- Party: Labour
- Education: Prestatyn High School; London School of Economics (LLB)

Alexandre Samuel Barros-Curtis (born 1986) is a British Labour party politician who has been the Member of Parliament for Cardiff West since 2024. Prior to his election, he was the Labour Party's Executive Director of Legal Affairs.

== Background ==
Barros-Curtis was born in North Wales. His mother was a teacher and his father was a police officer. He went to Gronant Primary School and Prestatyn High School, subsequently studying law at the London School of Economics.

== Career ==
Barros-Curtis had been a lawyer and marketing consultant. In 2016 he was a senior parliamentary assistant to Andy Burnham MP and, in the same year, was a close advisor to Owen Smith during Smith's attempt to become leader of the Labour Party. Barros-Curtis and his company, Movement for Another Future Limited, were linked to Sir Keir Starmer's successful campaign to become Labour leader in April 2020.

Later in 2020 Barros-Curtis became the Labour Party's Executive Director of Legal Affairs. Overseeing Labour's Compliance Unit, he was central to the party's plans to deal with allegations of anti-semitism. He was criticised for his handling of costly legal action against five ex-Labour staff members who had been accused of leaking an internal report on anti-semitism. The cases were dropped on 6 June 2024, after costing the party at least £2.4 million.

== Parliamentary career ==
On 31 May 2024, it was announced Barros-Curtis had been selected as Labour candidate for the safe Cardiff constituency of Cardiff West, after the sitting Labour MP, Kevin Brennan, had announced his intention to stand down. The selection had been made by a panel composed of Welsh Labour's Welsh Executive Committee and representatives from the local Labour parties. Anger was expressed by Labour Party members that Barros-Curtis lived in London, had no connection to the area and had been "parachuted" into the constituency without meaningful local input into the decision. It was reported that the Senedd member for Cardiff West (and former Wales First Minister), Mark Drakeford, had refused to share the same office and was looking for new premises.

Barros-Curtis won the Cardiff West election with approximately one third of the votes (16,442) with a majority of 7,019 over the second-placed Plaid Cymru candidate.

== Personal life ==
Barros-Curtis is gay and has a husband.

Parliament of the United Kingdom
Preceded by Kevin Brennan	Member of Parliament for Cardiff West; 2024–present	Incumbent
