= Kevin Brennan, Baron Brennan of Canton =

British politician (born 1959)

The Right Honourable The Lord Brennan of Canton
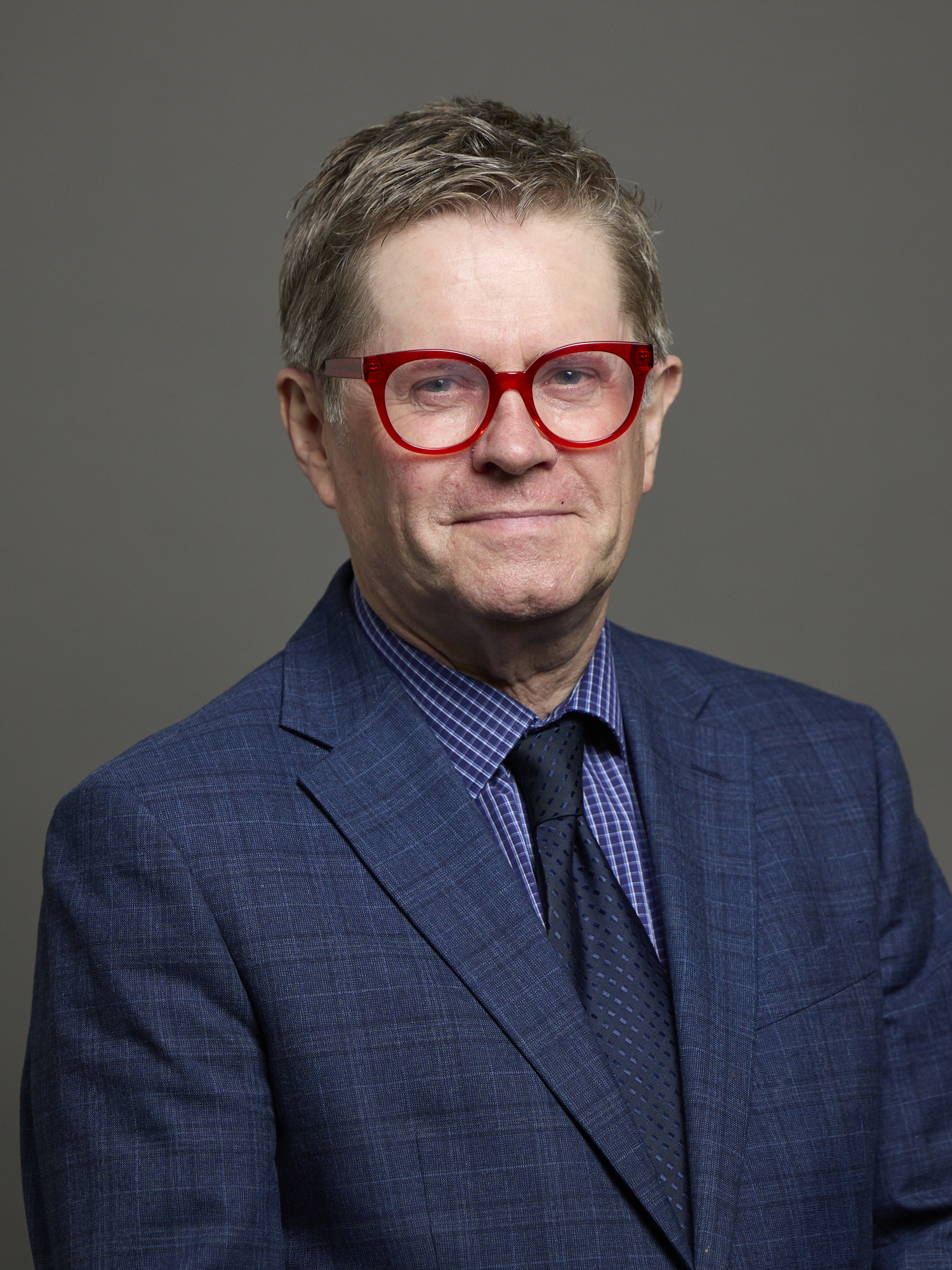
- Official portrait, 2025

Minister of State for Further Education, Skills, Apprenticeships and Consumer Affairs
- In office 9 June 2009 – 6 May 2010
- Prime Minister: Gordon Brown
- Preceded by: Office established
- Succeeded by: John Hayes

Minister for the Third Sector
- In office 5 October 2008 – 9 June 2009
- Prime Minister: Gordon Brown
- Preceded by: Phil Hope
- Succeeded by: Angela Smith

Parliamentary Under-Secretary of State for Children, Young People and Families
- In office 29 June 2007 – 5 October 2008
- Prime Minister: Gordon Brown
- Preceded by: Parmjit Dhanda
- Succeeded by: The Baroness Morgan of Drefelin

Lord Commissioner of the Treasury
- In office 5 May 2006 – 28 June 2007
- Prime Minister: Tony Blair
- Preceded by: Joan Ryan
- Succeeded by: Steve McCabe
Shadow portfolios
Shadow Minister for Victims and Sentencing
In office 7 September 2023 – 4 July 2024
Leader	Keir Starmer
Preceded by	Anna McMorrin (Victims); Alex Cunningham (Sentencing)
Succeeded by	Sarah Bool (2026)
Shadow Minister for Arts and Heritage
In office 9 October 2016 – 10 April 2020
Leader	Jeremy Corbyn
Preceded by	Thangam Debbonaire
Succeeded by	Alex Sobel
Shadow Minister for Trade, Investment, and Intellectual Property
In office 18 September 2015 – 9 October 2016
Leader	Jeremy Corbyn
Preceded by	Stephen Doughty
Succeeded by	Bill Esterson
Shadow Minister for Education
In office 8 October 2010 – 18 September 2015
Leader	Ed Miliband
Shadow Minister for Further Education, Skills, Apprenticeships and Consumer Affairs
In office 12 May 2010 – 8 October 2010
Leader	Harriet Harman
Preceded by	John Hayes
Succeeded by	Gordon Marsden

Member of the House of Lords
- Lord Temporal
- Life peerage 24 January 2025

Member of Parliament for Cardiff West
- In office 7 June 2001 – 30 May 2024
- Preceded by: Rhodri Morgan
- Succeeded by: Alex Barros-Curtis

Personal details
- Born: Kevin Denis Brennan; 16 October 1959 (age 67) Cwmbran, Wales
- Party: Labour
- Spouse: Amy Lynn Wack (m. 1988)
- Children: 1
- Education: Pembroke College, Oxford; Cardiff University; University of South Wales
- Website: Official website

Kevin Denis Brennan, Baron Brennan of Canton (born 16 October 1959), is a Welsh politician. A member of the Labour Party, he served as Member of Parliament (MP) for Cardiff West from 2001 to 2024. He served as a minister of state at both the Department for Business, Innovation and Skills and the Department for Children, Schools and Families from 2009 to 2010.

Brennan held several junior ministerial offices from 2006 to 2009 at the Treasury, the Cabinet Office and the Department for Children, Schools and Families. In opposition, he served in various shadow ministerial positions from 2010 to 2020. He was Shadow Minister for Victims and Sentencing from September 2023 until his retirement from frontline politics at the 2024 general election. Brennan was subsequently appointed to the House of Lords in 2025.

== Early life and career ==
Brennan was born in Cwmbran, South Wales, the son of a steelworker and a school dinner lady. He was educated at St Alban's RC High School in Pontypool and Pembroke College, Oxford, graduating with a degree in Philosophy, politics and economics in 1982. Brennan was elected President of the Oxford Union in the same year with support from William Hague, who preferred Brennan's candidacy over those from the left of the Conservative faction in the Union. Following graduation, he returned to Wales to study at the University College of Wales, Cardiff, where he qualified as a teacher with a Postgraduate Certificate in Education in history in 1985. He finished his education with a master's degree in Education Management at the University of Glamorgan (now the University of South Wales) in 1992.

In 1982, Brennan joined the Cwmbran Community Press as a journalist. He joined the National Union of Teachers in 1984 before becoming a teacher at Radyr Comprehensive School in 1985. He became the Head of the Economics Department before leaving in 1994. Between 1991 and 2001, Brennan was a member of Cardiff Council representing the ward of Canton, Cardiff. During this time he served as Chair of the Finance Committee, Chair of the Economic Scrutiny Committee and Vice-Chair of Economic Development.

== Parliamentary career ==
=== House of Commons ===
Following Rhodri Morgan's decision to step down as the Member of Parliament for Cardiff West in order to concentrate on being the First Minister of Wales, Brennan was selected as the Labour candidate for the constituency and became the MP for Cardiff West at the 2001 general election. He won with a majority of 11,321 votes, (33.3%).

In July 2002, Brennan appeared in the House of Commons without a tie and called for Westminster to have "dress down" Thursdays, stating that Billy Bragg had complained Parliamentarians gave a "besuited image that's male, pale and stale". It provoked jeers from some Conservative MPs. Michael Fabricant expressed concern about Brennan not wearing a tie and made a point of order to the Speaker, Michael Martin, who agreed with Fabricant. Brennan was forced to leave the chamber to retrieve a tie from his office.

Brennan was re-elected as the MP for Cardiff West at the 2005 general election with a reduced majority of 8,167 (23.6%). This included a −4.8% swing from Brennan to the Conservative Party candidate. Following the general election, he was promoted to Tony Blair's government as an Assistant Government Whip.

In June 2007, Blair's successor Gordon Brown appointed Brennan as Parliamentary under-secretary of state for Children, Young People and Families in the new Department for Children, Schools and Families, replacing Parmjit Dhanda. Brennan was replaced in this role by Lady Morgan following the government reshuffle in October 2008. He was moved to Minister for the Third Sector at the Cabinet Office before being promoted in 2009, becoming the Minister of State for Further Education, Skills, Apprenticeships and Consumer Affairs, with responsibilities in both the Department for Education and the Department for Business, Innovation and Skills. Following the 2010 General Election, he continued this role in a Shadow Ministerial capacity before Ed Miliband's decision to appoint Brennan to the position of Shadow Minister for Schools.

At the 2010 general election, Brennan was again re-elected as the MP for Cardiff West with a reduced majority of 4,750 votes.

In 2010, Brennan became the first MP to win the British Computer Society's (BCS) Social Media MP of the year award, beating Nick Clegg and Jeremy Corbyn, who both finished as runners-up.

At the 2015 general election, Brennan was again re-elected as the MP for Cardiff West with an increased majority of 6,789 votes.

Brennan was made Shadow Minister for Trade, Investment, and Intellectual Property by Jeremy Corbyn in September 2015. He resigned from this position on 28 June 2016, following a motion of no confidence in Corbyn which was passed overwhelmingly by Labour MPs, 172–40, in a vote which was not binding. Brennan supported Owen Smith in the failed attempt to replace Jeremy Corbyn in the 2016 Labour leadership election.

At the snap 2017 general election, Brennan was again re-elected as MP for Cardiff West with an increased majority of 12,551 votes.

At the 2019 general election, Brennan was again re-elected as the MP for Cardiff West with a reduced majority of 10,986 votes.

Brennan supported Lisa Nandy in the 2020 Labour leadership election.

In the 2023 British shadow cabinet reshuffle, he returned to the frontbench as Shadow Minister for Victims and Sentencing.

On 27 May 2024, Brennan announced his retirement at the 2024 general election.

==== Allied Steel and Wire ====
In July 2002, the steel manufacturer Allied Steel and Wire (ASW) entered receivership, and many of their employees were told they would not receive their full company pensions because of a fund shortfall. Brennan, who had many former workers of Allied Steel & Wire as constituents, tabled an early day motion in the Commons in November calling for compensation, and threatened to table an amendment to the Pensions Bill if the government did not offer any help. After Brennan carried out his threat to table the amendment, The Independent newspaper reported that Tony Blair faced the "biggest backbench rebellion" of his career. Ultimately, Brennan was successful. The BBC said he was "instrumental in extracting the government's commitment to establish a £400 million fund to provide compensation for workers who lost their pensions when their firms went bankrupt".

==== Expenses ====
In 2009, Brennan came under scrutiny during the Expenses scandal for claiming questionable items, including a £450 television claimed for his London second home which was delivered to this family home in Cardiff. He claimed for bunk beds for his daughter while the expenses system was intended exclusively for items for the MPs' use. Brennan said he bought from businesses in his constituency but the items were for use in his second home, calling the story a "smear with no basis in fact".

==== Guitars for prisoners ====
In 2014, Brennan led a campaign with musician Billy Bragg to lift a blanket ban on prisoners having access to guitars. They were backed in their campaign by musicians including Johnny Marr, David Gilmour and Richard Hawley. Brennan held a Westminster Hall debate on the subject to try and get the government to overturn the ban, citing the importance and the efficacy of music as a means for the rehabilitation for prisoners. The Government agreed and prisoners can now have access to the instruments.

=== House of Lords ===
In late 2024, Brennan was nominated for a Labour Party life peerage by Prime Minister Keir Starmer. He was created Baron Brennan of Canton, of Canton in the City of Cardiff, on 24 January 2025, and was introduced to the House of Lords on 4 February.

== Personal life ==
Brennan has been married to Amy Lynn Wack since 1988; the couple have one daughter. Brennan supports Cardiff City Football Club and the Cardiff Blues rugby team. He is also a member of a parliamentary rock band MP4 with fellow politicians Ian Cawsey, Pete Wishart and Greg Knight. They have helped to raise over £1 million for charity as well as releasing an album and an EP. They were the house band on the television show Unspun with Matt Forde. He released his first solo album in 2021, a folk album titled The Clown and the Cigarette Girl, which featured Glen Matlock on bass.

=== Friends of Jo Cox ===
In 2016, following the murder of Jo Cox, the MP for Batley and Spen, Brennan put together the 'Friends of Jo Cox' to record a charity single to raise money for the Jo Cox Foundation which had been set up in her memory. The Friends of Jo Cox included the parliamentary rock band MP4, the House of Commons choir, MPs from other parties and a group of musicians including David Gray, KT Tunstall, Ricky Wilson and Steve Harley. The song was a cover of The Rolling Stones' "You Can't Always Get What You Want", with the Rolling Stones waiving their royalties for the Jo Cox Foundation. The single made the iTunes Top 10, and narrowly missed out on the top 100 UK Singles chart before Christmas Day. The single raised more than £35,000.

Parliament of the United Kingdom
Preceded by Rhodri Morgan	Member of Parliament for Cardiff West; 2001–2024	Succeeded by Alex Barros-Curtis
