= Creigiau & St Fagans =

Coordinates: 51.514°N 3.280°W

Creigiau & St. Fagans
- Electoral ward
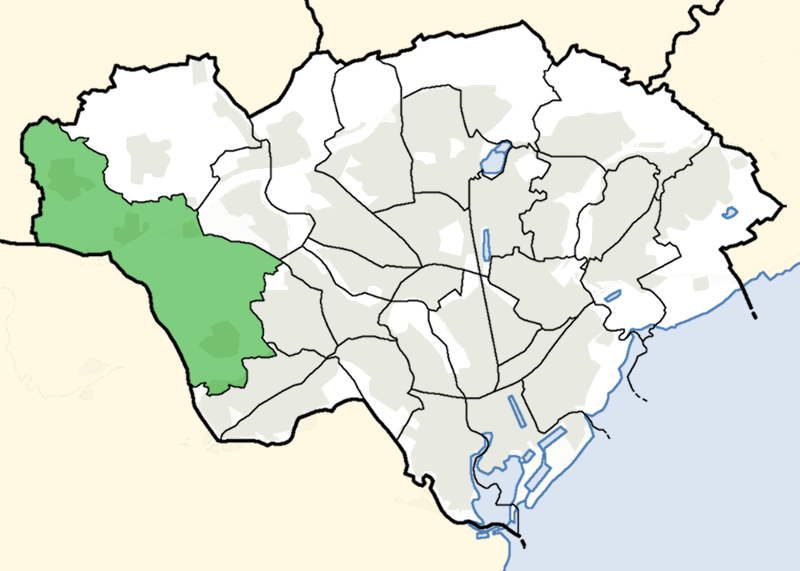
- Population: 5,153 (2011 census)
- Principal area: Cardiff
- Country: Wales
- Sovereign state: United Kingdom
- Post town: CARDIFF
- Postcode district: CF5
- Dialling code: +44-29
- UK Parliament: Cardiff West
- Senedd Cymru – Welsh Parliament: Cardiff West
- Councillors: 1

Creigiau & St. Fagans was a rural electoral ward on the western edge of Cardiff, Wales.

== Description ==
The ward covered the villages of St. Fagans and Creigiau (in the community of Pentyrch) and the surrounding rural area. The Creigiau/St Fagans ward elected a councillor to Cardiff Council.

The ward fell within the parliamentary constituency of Cardiff West. It was bounded by Rhondda Cynon Taff to the northwest; Pentyrch and Radyr & Morganstown to the northeast; Llandaff and Fairwater to the east; Ely to the southeast; and the Vale of Glamorgan to the southwest.

According to the 2011 census, the population of the ward was 5,153.

Until the 2012 council elections, the ward was represented by the Plaid Cymru Lord Mayor of Cardiff, Delme Bowen.

== Election results ==
=== 2017 ===
2017 Cardiff Council election
Party	Candidate	Votes	%	±%
Conservative	Graham Thomas	948	47%	
Plaid Cymru	Wynford Ellis Owen	644	32%	
Labour	John Yarrow	334	17%	
Liberal Democrats	Peter Borrow	91	5%	

=== 2012 ===
In a surprise result, the Conservatives won the seat from Plaid Cymru by 25 votes. The seat had been previously held by Plaid Cymru's Delme Bowen, who stood down after serving a tenure as Cardiff's Lord Mayor. Bowen had been a Plaid Cymru councillor since 1995.

2012 Cardiff Council election
Party	Candidate	Votes	%	±%
Conservative	Graham Thomas	648	38%	
Plaid Cymru	Wynford Ellis Owen	623	36%	
Labour	S. Evans	321	19%	
Liberal Democrats	H. Borrow	53	3%	
Green	T. Jones	52	3%	

== Merger ==
In October 2021 Cardiff Council accepted a number of ward change proposals made by the Local Democracy and Boundary Commission for Wales. These included the merger of Creigiau/St Fagans with the Pentyrch ward to form a new ward of "Pentyrch and St Fagans". This would take effect from the 2022 council election.
