= Anna Brychan =

Welsh politician and academic

Anna Brychan MS
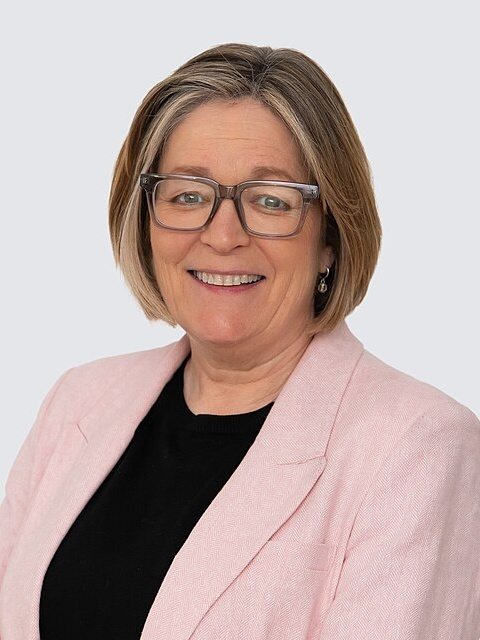
- Official portrait, 2026

Cabinet Minister for Education and the Welsh Language
- Incumbent
- Assumed office 13 May 2026
- First Minister: Rhun ap Iorwerth
- Preceded by: Lynne Neagle (Note: as Cabinet Minister for Education); Mark Drakeford (Note: as Cabinet Minister for the Welsh Language)

Member of the Senedd for Caerdydd Penarth
- Incumbent
- Assumed office 8 May 2026
- Preceded by: Constituency Established

Personal details
- Born: Ceredigion, Wales
- Party: Plaid Cymru
- Relations: John Davies (father)
- Education: University of Wales, Cardiff; University of Wales, Swansea; Mannheim University

Anna Heledd Brychan is a Welsh politician, trade unionist and academic who has served as Cabinet Minister for Education and the Welsh Language and a Member of the Senedd (MS) for Caerdydd Penarth since May 2026.

== Background ==
Brychan is from Ceredigion, but has lived in Grangetown, Cardiff for over 25 years. Her father is Welsh historian John Davies. She has 3 sons.

== Professional career ==
Brychan was director of the Welsh branch of the National Association of Head Teachers from 2004 to 2014.

She is the Assistant Dean of the Athrofa Centre for Education at the University of Wales Trinity Saint David.

== Political career ==
Brychan held various roles within Plaid Cymru in the early years of devolution, including being a Spokesperson for the party in 2002, and serving as a Chief Executive.

In June 2025, Brychan was selected to contest the Caerdydd Penarth Senedd constituency in the 2026 Senedd election, placed first on the party's list.

On 13 May 2026, she was chosen to be Cabinet Minister for Education and the Welsh Language.
