= Delme Bowen =

Mayor of Cardiff, Wales

Ifor Delme Bowen
- Born: Glanaman, Carmarthenshire, Wales
- Died: 25 March 2026; Prince Charles Hospital, Merthyr Tydil
- Occupations: Cell biologist; Politician
- Employer: Cardiff University
- Known for: Lord Mayor of Cardiff (2011–2012)
- Title: Emeritus professor of cell biology
- Children: 4

Ifor Delme Bowen was an emeritus professor of cell biology at Cardiff University. He was Lord Mayor of Cardiff, Wales for the year 2011 to 2012 and was an elected Cardiff councillor for 17 years.

== Political career ==
Bowen began his political career in 1977 as a member of Llantrisant Community Council. He unsuccessfully stood as the Plaid Cymru candidate for Pontypridd in the 1987 General Election, coming last with 5.3% of the vote.

He was first elected to Cardiff Council in 1995, as the council's only representative for the Welsh nationalist party, Plaid Cymru. He represented the Creigiau & St Fagans ward.

Bowen later became the council's executive member for traffic and transportation but, in May 2011, relinquished this position to become Lord Mayor of Cardiff. He was the first ever Plaid Cymru mayor of the city.

In November 2011 Bowen announced he would not be standing for re-election to the Council in May 2012. He claimed to be proud of his contribution, while the council's transport chief, to the introduction of the sustainable travel city programme, park-and-ride facilities and the pedestrianisation of some of Cardiff's main city streets. The 2012 local government elections saw Plaid Cymru lose the Creigiau & St Fagans seat to the Conservatives.

After moving to Carmarthenshire, in 2012 he sought election to Carmarthenshire County Council for the St Ishmaels Ward. However, he was defeated by the sitting Independent member, Mair Stephens.

== University career ==
Bowen was a lecturer in zoology and later professor of cell biology at Cardiff University until his retirement in 2010. He is the author of several books and research papers. On his retirement he was given the title of emeritus professor.

== Personal life ==
Bowen was born in Glanaman, Carmarthenshire and grew up near Ammanford. He lived in Creigiau with his partner, Pamela. He has four children. Following his retirement from Cardiff University, in May 2012 Bowen moved to Ferryside, Carmarthenshire, where he had been building a house.

He died 25 March 2026 at the Prince Charles Hospital, Merthyr Tydfil.
