= Statue of Betty Campbell =

2021 sculpture in Cardiff, Wales

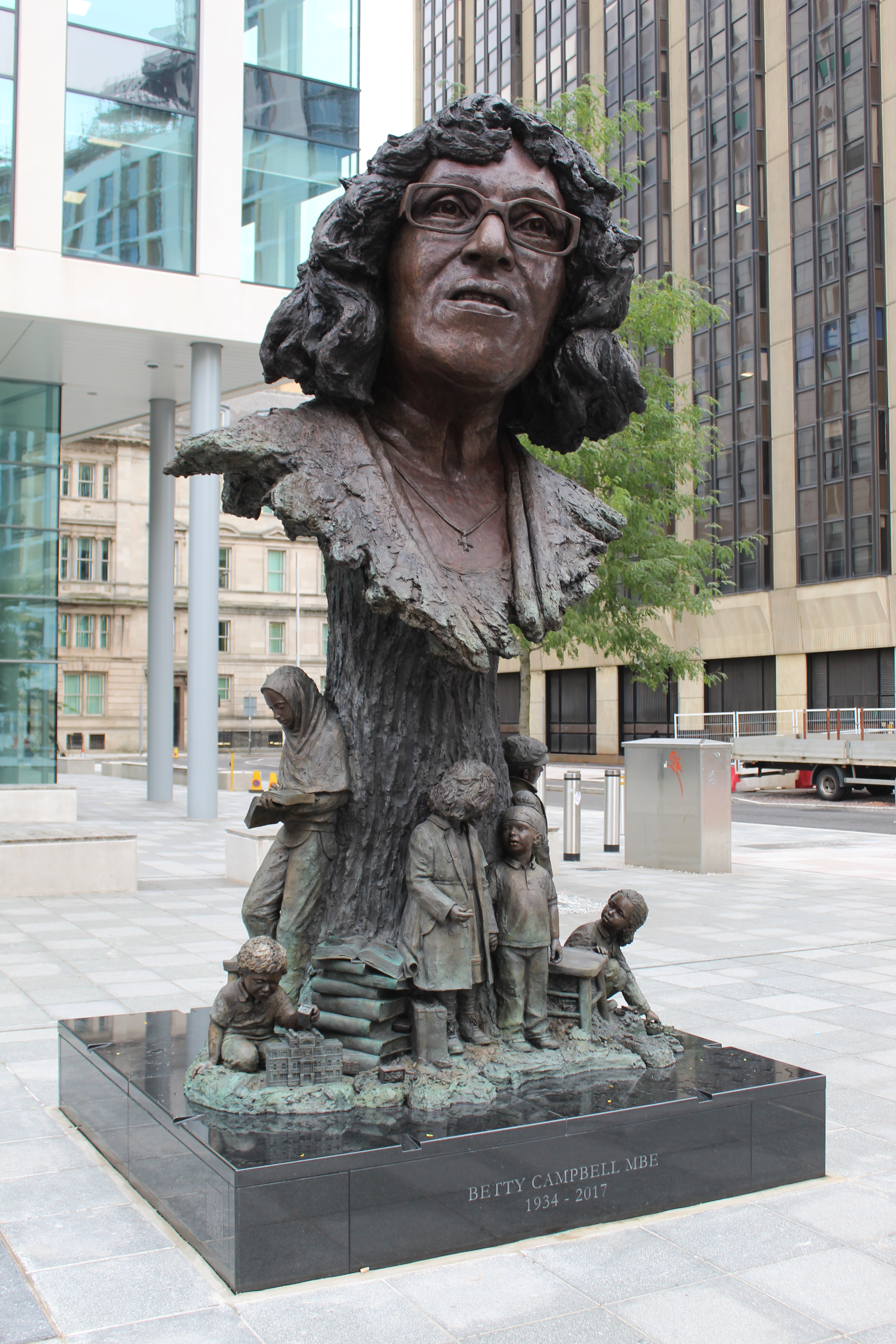
- The statue in 2021
- Artist: Eve Shepherd
- Subject: Betty Campbell
- Location: Cardiff, Wales, United Kingdom; 51.4775°N 3.1795°W

A statue of Betty Campbell sculpted by Eve Shepherd was unveiled in Central Square, Cardiff, Wales, in 2021. Betty Campbell had been the first black head teacher in Wales.

== Background ==
Campbell died at the age of 82 on 13 October 2017. First Minister of Wales Carwyn Jones described Campbell as "a true pioneer" and an "inspiration to other black and ethnic minority people."

Race Council Cymru immediately called for a statue to be erected in her memory. In Cardiff, the only statue of a woman who actually lived was that of Boudicca in the City Hall. This contrasted with the number of statues of famous men, including Aneurin Bevan, Ivor Novello and Lloyd George. In 2016, Helen Molyneux (the Chair of the Institute of Welsh Affairs), Carolyn Hitt, and the Welsh Women's Equality Network, organised 'Monumental Welsh Women', a task force to tackle this imbalance. In 2019, the BBC ran the 'Hidden Heroines' campaign to decide who should be the subject of Cardiff's first statue of a named woman, decided by a public vote. Five women were shortlisted: the poet and teacher Cranogwen (Sarah Jane Rees), the suffragette Lady Rhondda (Margaret Haig Thomas), the political organiser Elizabeth Andrews, the writer and anthropologist Elaine Morgan, and Betty Campbell.

On 18 January 2019, it was announced that Campbell had won the vote, and that her statue would be erected in the plaza of Central Square.

== Design and development ==
The Betty Campbell statue was intended to be an iconic landmark that people travel to Cardiff just to see. Sculptor Eve Shepherd was chosen from a shortlist of three artists.

The finished sculpture is 4 metres (13 ft) high and cast in bronze. Cambell's head and shoulders create a canopy sheltering ten bronze children of various ages depicted at the base of the statue. The base also includes mini bronze models of landmarks in Tiger Bay, for example the Pierhead Building and the Wales Millennium Centre. In addition there are small bronze chairs which are designed to be sat upon.

On seeing the final design, Elaine Clarke, Campbell's daughter, commented that it encapsulated her mother "in a way that ensures her legacy of determination, aspiration and inspiration lives on for generations to come". The statue was financed by private, corporate, crowd-sourced and Welsh Government funding and it was intended to be installed in 2020. After delays caused by COVID-19 restrictions, the unveiling took place on 29 September 2021. An image of the statue was included in video accompanying the official Wales World Cup song in 2022.
