= Keith Palmer (businessman) =

British businessman (born 1947)

Sir Keith Palmer KCMG OBE
- Born: Keith Francis Palmer; 27 July 1947 (age 77); Cardiff, Glamorgan, Wales
- Occupation: Businessman
- Spouse: Penny McDonagh (m. 1974)
- Children: 4

Sir Keith Francis Palmer KCMG OBE (born 27 July 1947) is a British businessman.

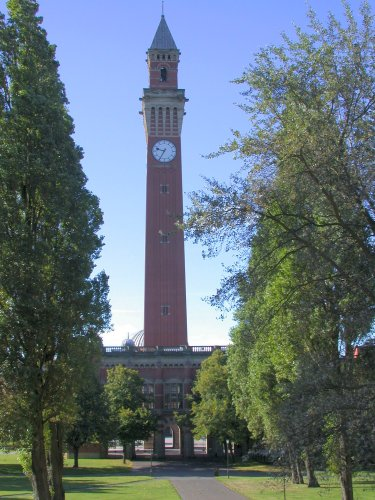
Birmingham University

== Education ==
Palmer was born in Cardiff to Gwenda (née Merrick) and Frank Palmer. His early education was at Howardian High School in Cardiff. He graduated from the University of Birmingham with a BSc in Geology in 1968, and a PhD in 1971.

== Career ==
Palmer is a businessman in public–private partnerships in international development. He was the founding chairman of economic consultancy Cambridge Economic Policy Associates (CEPA) and is currently chairman of AgDevCo, which develops sustainable agriculture in Africa, and of InfraCo, which develops infrastructure in Africa and Asia. Previously Palmer was Vice-Chairman of N M Rothschild & Sons from 1997 to 2002. He is a Research Fellow at the London School of Economics and was an Honorary Professor at the University of Dundee's Centre for Energy, Petroleum and Mineral Law and Policy.

== Honours ==
Palmer was appointed an Officer of the Order of the British Empire (OBE) in the 2010 Birthday Honours for services to economic development overseas. In the 2024 King's Birthday Honours, he was appointed Knight Commander of the Order of St Michael and St George (KCMG) "for services to international development".

He was awarded the honorary degree of Doctor of the University (DUniv) by Birmingham University in 2013.

== Personal life ==
Palmer has been married to Penny McDonagh since 1974; they have four daughters.
