= Betty Campbell =

Welsh community activist and headteacher

Betty Campbell MBE
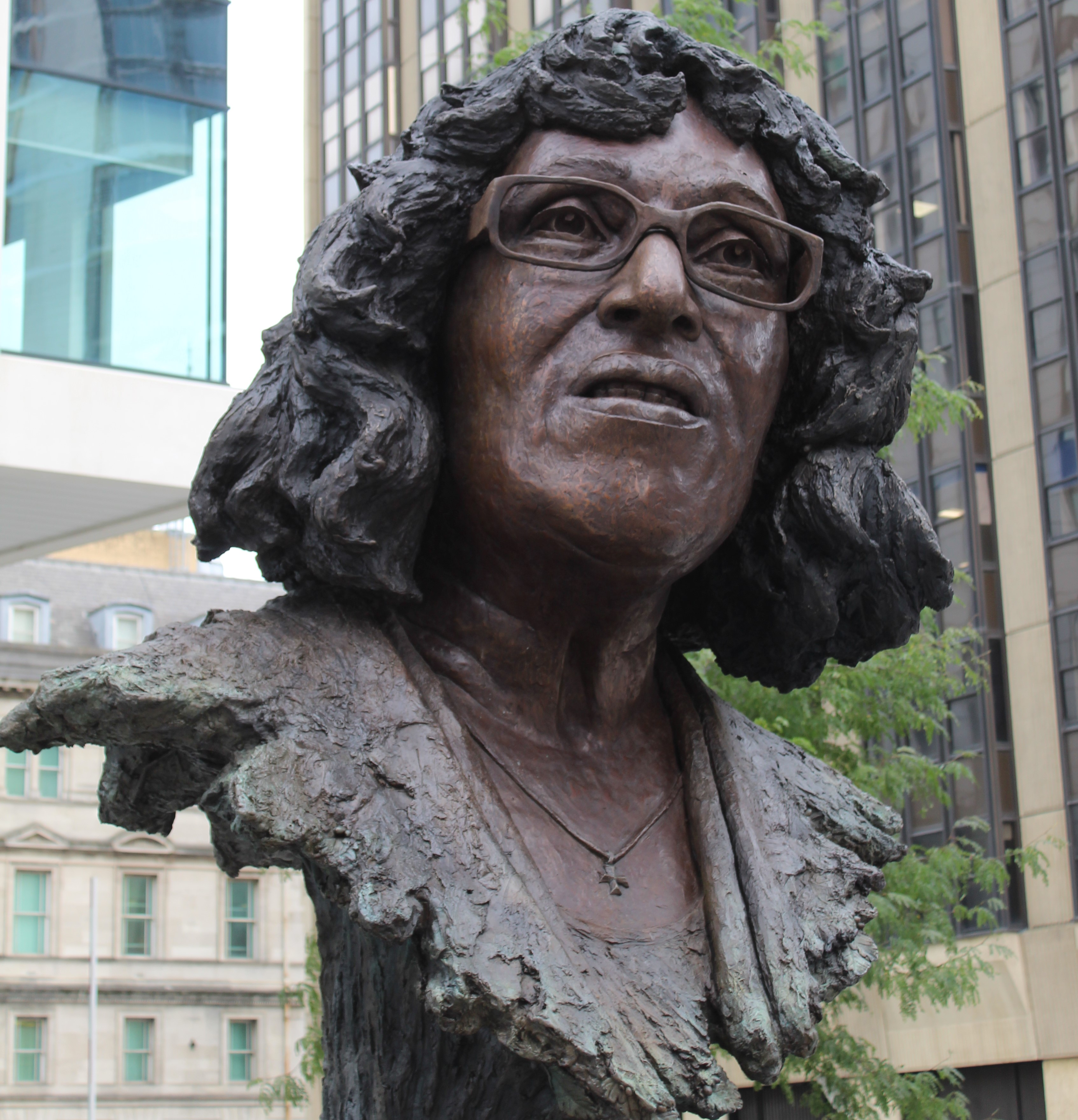
- Statue of Betty Campbell, Cardiff
- Born: Rachel Elizabeth Johnson; 6 November 1934; Butetown, Cardiff, Wales
- Died: 13 October 2017 (aged 82); Butetown, Cardiff, Wales
- Education: Lady Margaret High School for Girls, Cardiff; Cardiff Teacher Training College
- Occupations: Head teacher, community activist
- Employer: Mount Stuart Primary School
- Organization(s): Commission for Racial Equality (member); Cardiff Councillor (1991–1995; 1999–2004)
- Title: Head teacher of Mount Stuart Primary School

Betty Campbell MBE (6 November 1934 – 13 October 2017, born Rachel Elizabeth Johnson) was a Welsh community activist, who was Wales' first black head teacher. Born into a poor household in Butetown, she won a scholarship to the Lady Margaret High School for Girls in Cardiff. Campbell later trained as a teacher, eventually becoming head teacher of Mount Stuart Primary School in Butetown, Cardiff. She put into practice innovative ideas on the education of children and was actively involved in the community.

== Early life and education ==
Betty Campbell was born Rachel Elizabeth Johnson in Butetown, Cardiff, in 1934. The area was formerly known as Tiger Bay, which had built up around Cardiff docklands and was one of the UK's first multi-cultural communities. Her mother, Honora, known as Nora, was Welsh Barbadian. Her father, Simon Vickers Johnson, who had come to the UK from Jamaica at the age of 15, was killed in World War II when his ship the Ocean Vanguard was torpedoed in 1942. After his death, Betty's mother struggled financially and occasionally worked as an illegal street bookmaker. At school, Betty was top of her class. She won a scholarship to the Lady Margaret High School for Girls in Cardiff and wanted to be a teacher from a young age. She faced discouragement from one of her teachers who told her the problems for a working-class black girl would be "insurmountable". This reduced her to tears, but it made her more determined to achieve her goals.

== Career and life ==
Betty Johnson became pregnant at the age of 17, while she was doing her A-levels. She left school when she married Rupert Campbell, a fitter's mate, in 1953. Betty Campbell had four children, one of whom had special needs. She had 14 grandchildren and 17 great-grandchildren.

In 1960, when Campbell already had three children, she discovered that Cardiff Teacher Training College had started to enrol female students. Campbell applied, and was one of only six female students to be admitted.

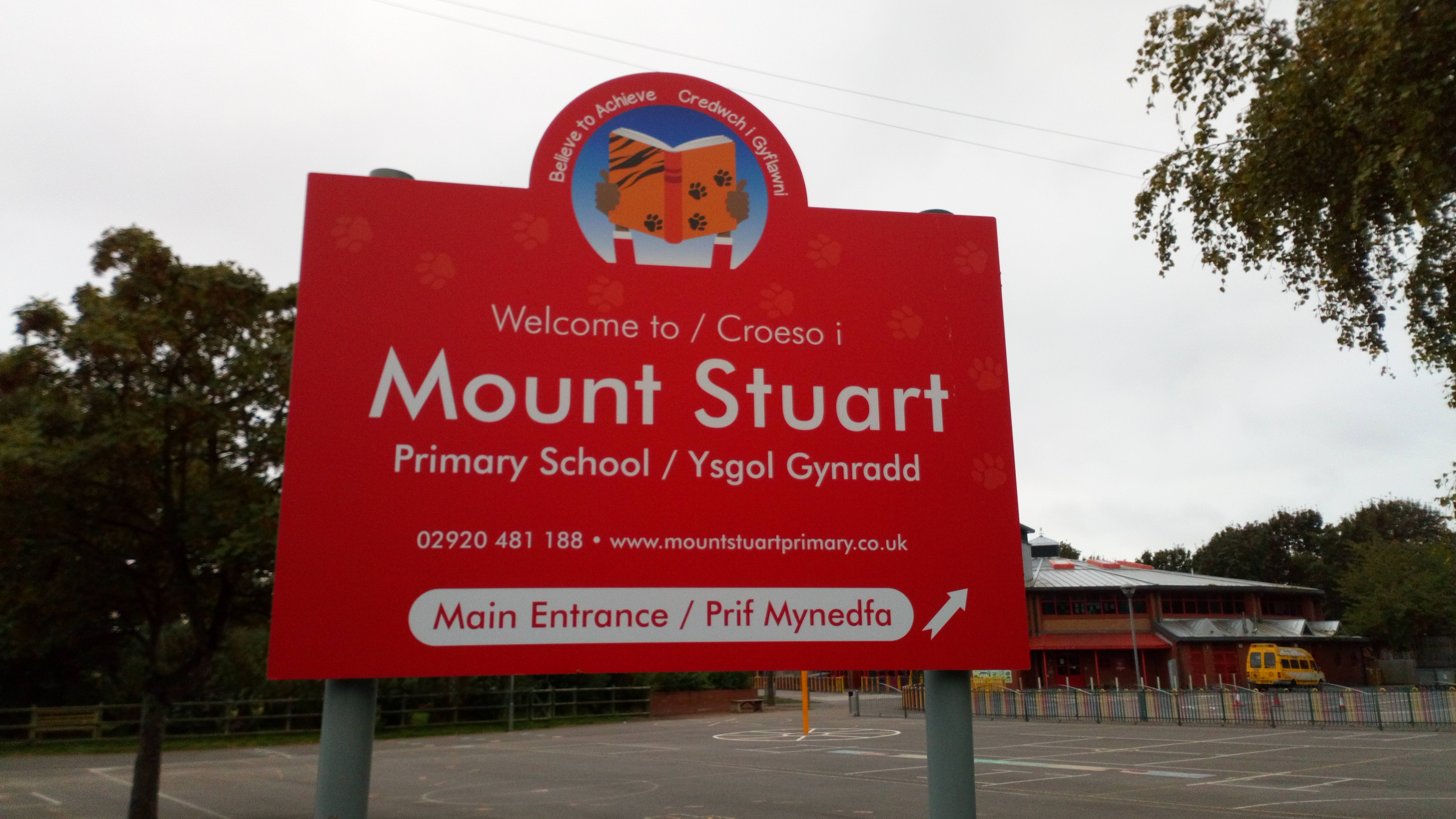
Mount Stuart Primary School, Butetown, Cardiff

Campbell's first teaching post was in Llanrumney. She soon returned to Butetown, getting a job at Mount Stuart Primary School, where she taught for 28 years. As a black teacher she experienced hostility from some parents: "They hadn't seen a black teacher before. It was as if you could do a job, but if you’re black you weren’t quite as good."

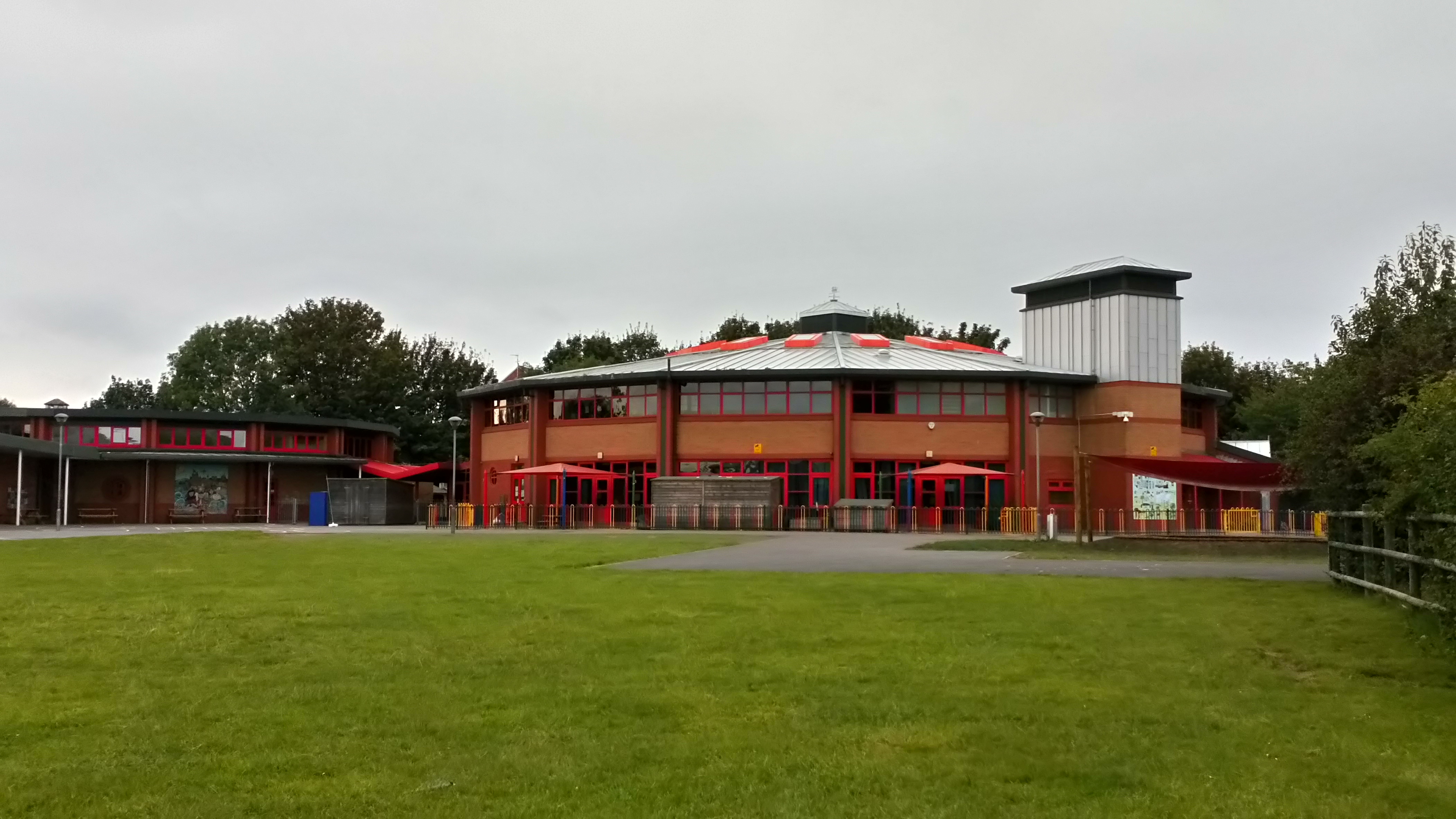
School Buildings, Mount Stuart Primary School, Butetown, Cardiff

Campbell was inspired by a trip to the US where she learned about anti-slavery activists like Harriet Tubman and the civil rights movement. When she became Wales' first black head teacher at Mount Stuart in the 1970s, she began teaching children about slavery, black history and the system of apartheid which operated at the time in South Africa.

Speaking later in the Senedd, Campbell explained: "I was determined that I was going to become one of those people and enhance the black spirit, black culture as much as I could." Campbell helped to create Black History Month and taught a series of workshops on the role of Butetown's citizens and their countries of origin in the Second World War.

She served as an independent councillor for Butetown on Cardiff Council from 1999 to 2004. Prior to that, she had been a Butetown councillor on Cardiff City Council, from 1991 to 1995. She was unseated by Vaughan Gething who won by two votes, Gething would go on to become the first black First Minister of Wales.

== Influence and recognition ==
Under Campbell's leadership, Mount Stuart School raised its profile across the United Kingdom, and became a template for multicultural education. Campbell became a member of the Home Office's race advisory committee and a member of the Commission for Racial Equality.

In 1994, Prince Charles attended the school's annual St David's Day eisteddfod. In 1998, as a member of the Commission for Racial Equality, Campbell was invited to meet Nelson Mandela on his only visit to Wales.

She was invited to be part of the Paul Hamlyn Foundation Commission on Education, which published a number of research papers on education. In 1993, it published the book Learning to Succeed, in which practice examples from Mount Stuart Primary School were cited.

Campbell was a board member of BBC Wales in the 1980s, and was made an honorary fellow of Cardiff Metropolitan University. In 2003, she was appointed an MBE for services to education and community life. In 2015, she received a lifetime achievement award from Unison Cymru's Black Members' group, for her contribution to black history and Welsh education.

== Death and legacy ==
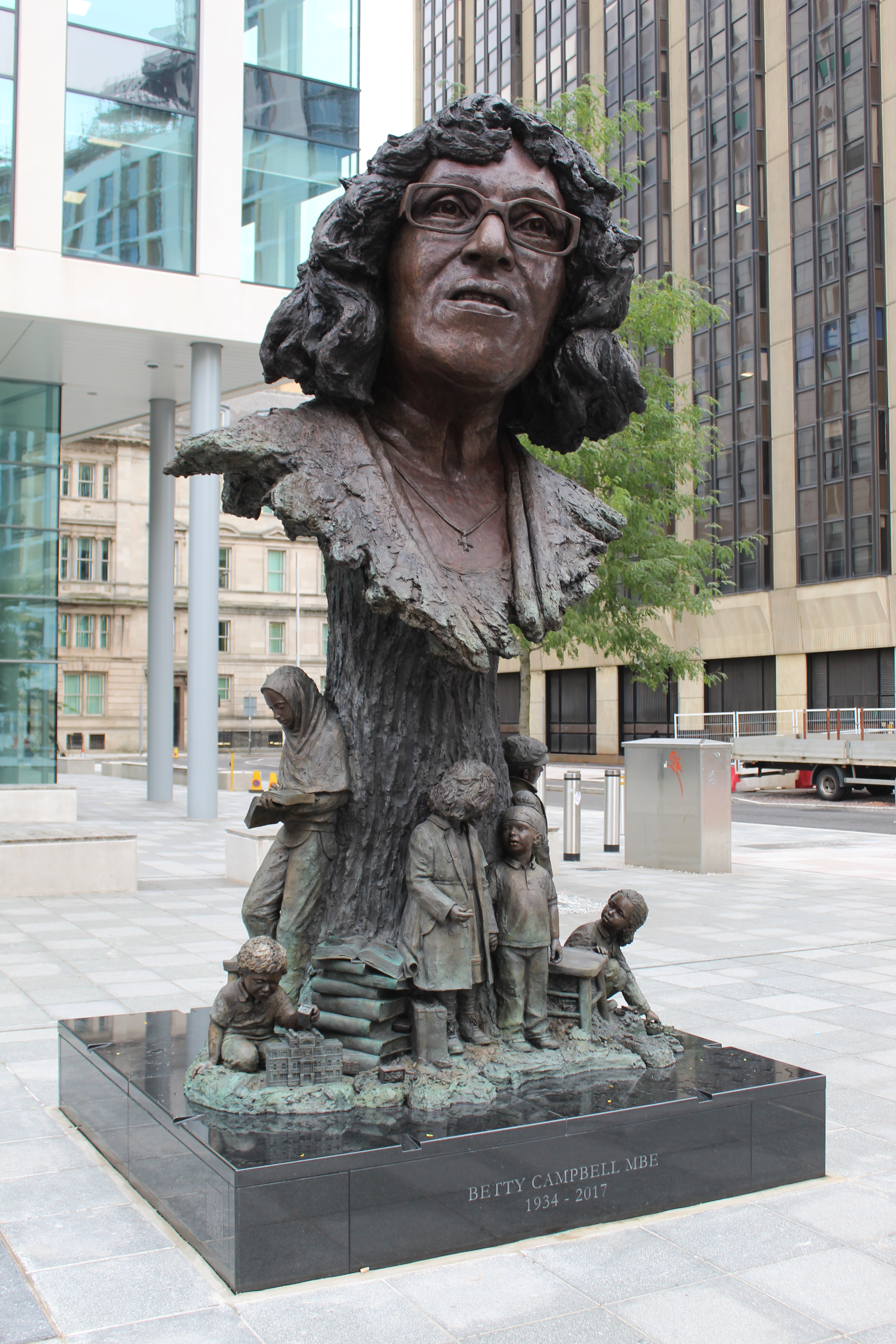
Statue of Betty Campbell by Eve Shepherd, Cardiff

Betty Campbell died at the age of 82 on 13 October 2017, having been ill for several months. Hundreds of people lined the streets of Cardiff to pay their respects. On her death, First Minister of Wales Carwyn Jones described Campbell as "a true pioneer" and an "inspiration to other black and ethnic minority people."

=== Statue ===
Race Council Cymru immediately called for a statue to be erected in Campbell's memory. In Cardiff, the only statue of a woman who actually lived was that of Boudicca in the City Hall. This contrasted with the number of statues of famous men, including Aneurin Bevan, Ivor Novello and Lloyd George. In 2016, Helen Molyneux (the Chair of the Institute of Welsh Affairs), Carolyn Hitt, and the Welsh Women's Equality Network, organised "Monumental Welsh Women", a task force to tackle this imbalance.

On 18 January 2019, it was announced that Campbell had won a vote, to have a statue erected in Cardiff, from a shortlist of the poet and teacher Cranogwen (Sarah Jane Rees), the suffragette Lady Rhondda (Margaret Haig Thomas), the political organiser Elizabeth Andrews, the writer and anthropologist Elaine Morgan, and Betty Campbell. Her statue would be erected in the plaza of Central Square. The sculptor Eve Shepherd was chosen from a shortlist of three artists. After delays caused by COVID-19 restrictions, the unveiling took place on 29 September 2021. In 2022, an image of the statue appeared in the video to the official Wales World Cup song Yma o Hyd.

== See also ==
- Beryl Gilroy, the first black headteacher in London
