= Monumental Welsh Women =

Welsh public art organisation

Monumental Welsh Women is a project to provide the first five statues of real Welsh women in Wales. It was started by a group of women, including Helen Molyneux, in 2016 and later became formalised as the not-for-profit Monumental Welsh Women Ltd. They work with other organisations, such as public art specialist group Studio Response, to raise funds and commission the statues.

Following publicity and public consultations, a short-list was drawn up. The final five were chosen and there was a series about them on the BBC in 2019.

The women selected were:

- Betty Campbell Monument in Cardiff (September 2021); the statue was commissioned from Eve Shepherd.
- Elaine Morgan in Mountain Ash (March 2022); the statue was commissioned from Emma Rodgers.
- Sarah Jane Rees (Cranogwen) in Llangrannog (June 2023); the statue was commissioned from Sebastien Boyesen.
- Lady Rhondda in Newport (September 2024); the statue was commissioned from Jane Robbins.
- Elizabeth Andrews (2025); the statue was commissioned from sculptor Billie Bond and installed in Rhondda Heritage Park in 2026.

While the project has set out to correct an oversight in the public commemoration of named Welsh women with the creation of these five new statues, they were by no means the first. An earlier rare example of a public statue dedicated to a named Welsh woman is the statue to Lady Mary Cornelia Vane-Tempest (1826-1906), fifth Marchioness of Londonderry, located in the Plas grounds in Machynlleth. The statue was created by sculptor Feodora Gleichen (1861–1922) and paid for by public subscription by the people of the town in 1909.
