= Social venture capital =

Form of investment funding

Social venture capital is a form of investment funding that is usually funded by a group of social venture capitalists or an impact investor to provide seed-funding investment, usually in a for-profit social enterprise, in return to achieve an outsized gain in financial return while delivering social impact to the world. There are various organizations, such as Venture Philanthropy (VP) companies and nonprofit organizations, that deploy a simple venture capital strategy model to fund nonprofit events, social enterprises, or activities that deliver a high social impact or a strong social causes for their existence. There are also regionally focused organizations (both for-profit and nonprofit) that target a specific region of the world, to help build and support the local community in a social cause.

== Types of funding and growth support ==
=== For-profit ===
==== Social venture accelerators ====
Social venture accelerators is a form of seed accelerators that fixed termed, cohort-based entrepreneurial development programs designed to transform validated idea of the social startups companies to seed funding. Hence, increase the outcomes for sustainability and growth of startup companies that have potential to scale (usually tech-based companies). Such programs allows startup companies to gain exclusive visibility to early- stage investors and other resources such as providing initial investment, technical facilities/development, to office accommodation and under the guidance of experienced mentors, all of which in return of a minor share in the invested startups companies, or under grant funding to support participating companies. Seed accelerator companies will assess based on startup companies' business model and ensure market/customer sector validated, to develop a commercial validity of the social startup companies to investment ready and prepare to scale their impact.

==== Social incubators ====
Business incubators usually provide business with facilities and funding with the help of external management team to manage an idea that was developed internally. Given the intense efforts involved, the incubator period usually lasted longer the seed accelerator, and takes up a much larger amount of equity than Seed Accelerator as well.

===== Social incubator fund =====
As part of effort of UK Government to support social ventures from a grassroots level to deliver positive social and environment impact, a £10 million Social Incubator Fund, which was launched on 24 July by Minister for Civil Society, Nick Hurd. The fund run by Big Lottery Fund will increase the amount of money available at the early stages of projects where the financial return is too low while Big Society Capital invests social investment intermediaries that carries higher financial risk. However, such funds doesn't indicate free funding, as incubators such as Social Incubators North, a social business incubator provided a repayment interest free loan of £25k to successful applicant. On the other hand, newly launched Non-For-Profit incubator Halcyon Incubator targeting on the social impact that the social ventures deliver, does not require equity in the fellow's venture, but only a commitment to growing ideas to achieve social change.

=== Non-profit oriented funding and support ===
Venture philanthropy deploys simple venture capital strategy model to fund non-profits events/social enterprises/activities that deliver high social impact or a strong social causes for its existence. Organization such as Amanter Social Venture provides such services focusing on social principles as main assessment criteria and running programs to help existing social organization/enterprise through capacity building and executive training to deliver a multiplier effect to the next beneficiary organizations. The classic example of Benetech, a non-profit organization, shows that the proceeds gained were being used to create a handful of new social enterprise patterned.

Regionally-focused organizations such as Venture Philanthropy Partners (VPP), the European Venture Philanthropy Association (EVPA) and the Asian Venture Philanthropy Network (AVPN), are associations that covers venture philanthropy funds targeting certain regions such as the National Capital Region in the US, Europe and Asia that finance charities, revenue generating social enterprises and socially driven business.

== Forms of social ventures funding ==
Social ventures unusually face a ranges of funding options not limited to the common ones such as debt capital with participation rights, mezzanine financing (quasi equity) or license fees.

=== Debt capital + Mezzanine capital ===
Common forms of funding such as debt capital + capital. Such funds supports the social ventures with invested capital that must be repaid either in short or long period of time, in additional with an agreement amount of interests. These raised capitals are usually secured with the assets of the company, by the lenders from banks and venture capital companies. In other words, if the company failed to repay their debt capitals, would results their ownership and equity interest to be liquidized. Noted, that mezzanine financing usually blinded with a high returns of 20% to 30%.

=== Equity investments ===
Social venture capital companies will usually make equity investment and co-investments, when an anticipated exit strategy of the company is foreseeable. Such investment are made through preferred shares which commonly entitled the lenders a fixed dividend that takes priority over that of ordinary share dividends, usually without voting rights.

== Investment approach ==
To effectively maximize the fund's capital to deliver social impact, social venture companies are attracted to successful financing social enterprises that show growth and financial sustainability, usually when anticipated exit strategy of the company is foreseeable, especially for young venture capital firms to minimize their exit from the invested companies, to maximize the opportunity of future fund raising, especially, when prospect of exits beyond the 7 year periods decreases for companies going for initial public offering (IPO) and merger and acquisition.

== Investor tax relief scheme ==
=== Venture capital scheme ===
==== Enterprise Investment Scheme (EIS) ====
The Enterprise Investment Scheme is a tax advantaged scheme designed to help companies that are at their early growth stage to raise equity finance from investors. Through this scheme, qualifying investors are able to claim income tax relief of 30%, plus exemption from capital gains tax when enterprise investment scheme shares are disposed of.

==== Seed Enterprise Investment Scheme (SEIS) ====
The Seed Enterprise Investment Scheme is a tax advantaged scheme designed to encourage investment from investor in higher-risk small companies that are in their early growth stage to raise equity finance. With contrast the existing Enterprise Investment Scheme (EIS), the SEIS allows qualifying investors can claim income tax relief of 50%, plus capital gains tax relief.

==== Venture Capital Trust (VCT) ====
The Venture Capital Trust Scheme is a tax advantaged scheme designed for a HMRC-Approved VCT company to chip in for shares in, lends money to small unquoted companies. Under scheme, the VCT companies itself exempt from CT on chargeable gains and their investors can claim income tax relief on subscriptions of up to £200,000.

=== Social investment tax relief ===
Social investment tax relief scheme is designed to encourage more social investments from investors to support social enterprise by introducing a range of tax relief schemes such as Income Tax relief, capital gains hold-over relief and capital gains disposal relief. SITR covers investments made on or after 6 April 2014. It means that debt investments into asset-locked bodies (like community interest companies) can now be made on the same tax relief terms as the Enterprise Investment Scheme for equity investments.

==== Income tax relief ====
Investors (need not to be UK resident) who subscribed to qualifying shares or make qualifying debt investments in the social enterprise that meet SITR requirement, are able to calm at 30% of the amount they invested, to a maximum investment of £1,000,000 up to 5 years after the 31 January following the tax year in which the investment was made.

==== Capital gains hold-over relief ====
Investors are able to defer the payment of tax on a capital gain of any kind of disposed asset, when the capital gains are reinvested in the share or debt investment which qualify for SITR Income Tax Relief. However, it must arise in the period from 6 April 2014 to 5 April 2019. The SITR qualifying investment must be made in the period one year before or three years after the gain arose.

==== Capital gains disposal relief ====
Any gain on the investment that is disposed after it has been held for at least three years, are free from Capital Gain Tax, in addition to the Income Tax Relief coverage on the cost of the investment.

=== Alternatives funding ===
==== Business angels/angel finance ====
Business angels are usually a group/single individual investors with a high-net-worth pool of investments looking for opportunities to invest in an enterprise, to achieve a reasonable amount on return of investment. As business angel funding involves investors injecting funds into a startup/private company in return for a share in its ownership, businesses that operate as sole traders or partnerships are usually not eligible for such financing.

==== Crowdsourcing ====
Crowdsourcing is a practice of funding a project or venture by raising monetary contributions from a large number of people, typically via the internet. For-profit fundraising companies using strategies such to charge a premium on "keep what you raise” model or minor charges on an "all-or-nothing funding approach" However, particularly for Social Crowdsourcing, non-profit organization such as razoo to help social enterprise or non-profit, student organization to raise fund for event or charitable causes.

== Examples of social venture capital firms ==
- AgDevCo - AgDevCo is a UK-government founded nonprofit agricultural investment company with a mission to improve food security and create more jobs in Africa. Founded in 2008. It invests in patient capital into early-stage, small to medium-sized agribusinesses in sub-Saharan Africa and connects them to market. On average, AgDevCo invests between $2 million and $10 million. Since inception, the fund has helped over two million smallholder farmers. It was funded with over $85 million from the British International Investment fund, SwedFund, and Norfund.
- Grassroots Business Fund - Grassroots Business Fund is a non-profit investment company that uses private investment funds to build and support intermediary business organizations that provide economic opportunities to low income communities. It began in 2004 as an initiative of the International Finance Corporation (IFC). In 2008, it split from IFC and became an independent non-profit. GBF has managed over $100 million and invested worldwide in small to medium-sized businesses across sectors including agriculture, clean energy, and healthcare. In 2011, it established a $49 million for-profit private investment fund, GBI-I, for patient capital investment, in addition to its non-profit investments.
- Obvious Ventures - Obvious Ventures was founded in 2014 by Medium CEO and Twitter co-founder Evan Williams, as well as James Joaquin and Vishal Vasishth. The fund focuses on making investments in planetary health, human health, and economic health. Their first fund was $123,456,789, the second was $191,919,191, the third was $271,828,182, the fourth fund was $355,111,553, and their fifth fund in 2026 was $360,360,360.

== See also ==
- Angel capital
- Corporate venture capital
- Microfinance
- Socially responsible investing
- Venture capital
