= Statue of Elizabeth Andrews =

Statue in Rhondda Heritage Park, Wales

A statue of the Welsh political activist Elizabeth Andrews is situated in Rhondda Heritage Park. It was unveiled in June 2026.

The creation of the statue by sculptor Billie Bond, was part of the Monumental Welsh Women public sculpture project. This was the fifth and final statue unveiled in the campaign over five years. It was unveiled at the Rhondda Heritage Park in Trehafod on 25 June 2026.

The Cabinet Minister for Culture and Sport, Heledd Fychan, said that the statue was a tribute to Andrews’s "extraordinary legacy and to the remarkable vision of the Monumental Welsh Women group who have ensured that five Welsh heroines now stand proudly in public spaces across our country" and that Andrews "did not accept inequality as inevitable: she challenged it and she changed things in very real, practical ways for the women, children and families of the coalfields".

== Description ==
The statue portrays Andrews standing on an upturned tin bath. She hold papers in her hand, reflecting her campaign for baths for mining workers. Andrews’s motto "Educate, Agitate, Organise" is stitched onto the bath. The lettering of the motto is based on the work of a community sewing group from Hirwaun. It was sculpted by Billie Bond in bronze and is 2 meters in height. A small child, Rhona Allen, is shown at her feet. Allen was born into a mining family in Llwynypia, Rhondda and was the aunt of the broadcaster Carolyn Hitt, a founder of the Monumental Welsh Women project. Allen ws one of many children Williams helped during the Welsh mining lock-out of 1926.
