= Helen Molyneux =

Welsh lawyer

Helen Molyneux is a Welsh lawyer who founded and was the CEO of the UK personal injury law firm NewLaw Solicitors. In 2024 she had led the installation of three new statues of leading Welsh women and she became one of the BBC's 100 Women.

== Life and career ==
Molyneux was born March 1965, in the Welsh town of Caerphilly. She studied law at Cardiff University and qualified as a solicitor in 1991.

On 24 April 2012 her firm Newlaw became the 1st Welsh and 4th overall practice to be licensed as an alternative business structure (ABS) by the Solicitors Regulation Authority. The idea originated, when Molyneux met a gentleman on a London train who owned an insurance brokers firm and they talked about the insurance market; they then came up with the idea of creating a law firm that manages personal injury claims from insurance companies and brokers.

In 2013, Molyneux was named Law Society Business Women of the year for employing over 470 people in the UK, turning over £35m annually in work with leading consumer brands. Molyneux later sold the firm.

== Legal awards and achievements ==
Date	Award Title	Awarding Body
2011	Best Women in Legal Business and Welsh Women of the year	Welsh Women Mean Business Awards 2011
2011	Lexcel Award for Excellence in Practice Management (Highly Commended)	The Law Society Excellence Awards 2011
2013	Law Society Business Women of the year	The Law Society
2014	Fellow/ Chairman	Institute of Welsh Affairs
2015	Honorary Doctorate of Laws	University of South Wales

== Awards ==
In December 2024, Helen Molyneux was included on the BBC's 100 Women list.

== Monumental Welsh Women ==
In 2016, Molyneux and four others came together to discuss the lack of statues in Wales dedicated to women; they then created the Monumental Welsh Women group with the aim of creating five statues around the country.

The first statue, of headteacher Betty Campbell, was unveiled in September 2021. Elaine Morgan, Cranogwen and Lady Rhondda had been unveiled by the end of 2024. One more statue, of Elizabeth Andrews, was planned for 2025. A theatre show about Cranogwen toured Wales in late 2022 to publicise the statues, involving Mewn Cymeriad Theatre Company.

== Women Angels of Wales ==
Molyneux is one of the founders of Women Angels of Wales, an angel investment group.
