= Mary Oliver Jones =

Welsh novelist

- Born: 14 February 1858; Liverpool, England
- Died: 1893 (aged 34–35)
- Known for: Novelist
- Notable work: Claudia; Nest Merfyn

Mary Oliver Jones (14 February 1858 – 1893) was an English-born novelist of Welsh ancestry from Liverpool, who wrote in Welsh. Several of her novels were serialised in contemporary magazines and newspapers, including one that is among the earliest detective novels in Welsh.

== Personal life ==
She was born on 14 February 1858 in Liverpool, the daughter of a Methodist minister, and lived there all her life. She was involved in Liverpool's Welsh community. Her first language was Welsh and she gained recognition as a novelist for her writing in this language. Her theme was mainly historical novels.

She died in 1893.

== Literary career ==
Her work gained recognition in 1880 after she won a competition with her novel Claudia, or Let us do our duty and all will be well (Claudia neu Gwnawn ein dyledswydd a daw pob peth un dda). The competition was for a Welsh-language novel to be published in installments in Y Frythones, the monthly Welsh-language magazine edited by Sarah Jane Rees. Unlike most magazines at the time, Y Frythones published work by women. Subsequently, a further 8 novels by Jones were published as serials in magazines such as Cymru and the weekly Caernarfon newspaper Y Genedl Gymreig. These included Nest Merfyn serialised 1891–3. The main character of this novel, Nest, is accused of murdering her grandfather's heir. It is considered one of the earliest detective novels in the Welsh language.

== Publications ==
Jones' novels include:

- Claudia, or Do our duty and all will be well, (Claudia neu Gwnawn ein dyledswydd a daw pob peth un dda) 1880, serialised in Y Frythones
- The Maid of Eithinfynydd: or, The love affairs of Wales, (Y Fun o Eithinfynydd) 1891
- Nest Merfyn, 1892–3, serialised in Cyfaill yr Aelwyd. Published as a single volume 2024 by Melin Bapur press. 106 pp.
