= Eve Shepherd =

British sculptor (born 1976)

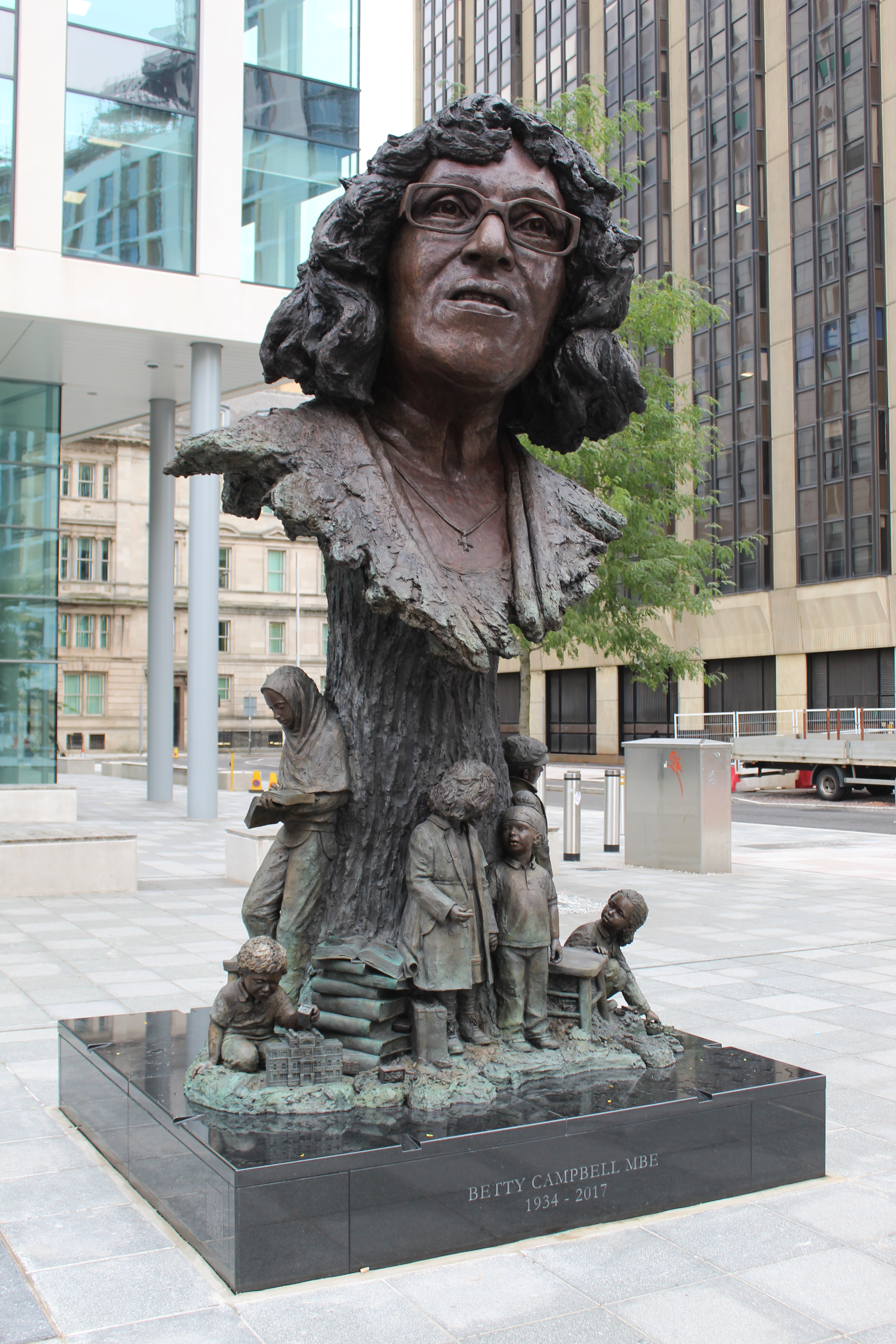
Shepherd's Statue of Betty Campbell, in Cardiff

Eve Shepherd MRSS (born 1976) is a British sculptor.

== Early life and education ==
Shepherd was born in Sheffield in 1976. She started work, aged 17, as an apprentice to sculptor Anthony Bennett, and then joined the production resource company The Scenic Route, with whom she worked from 1992 to 1997, latterly heading their sculpture department. She studied sculpture at Chelsea College of Art and Design in 2001–2002.

== Career ==
In 2008, Shepherd was commissioned to create a sculpture of Stephen Hawking for a garden at University of Cambridge, but the project was not completed because of the death of its intended funder.

Her bronze statue of Welsh activist and head teacher Betty Campbell stands in Central Square in Cardiff and was unveiled in 2021. It is said to be "the first statue of a named, real woman in Wales". The statue, which she won a competition to create, was described as "stunning", "triumphant" and "intimate in detail" in Wales Online in 2021.

In 2021, she won the competition to create a sculpture of Emily Williamson, founder of the Royal Society for the Protection of Birds, to be erected in Fletcher Moss Botanical Garden, Didsbury, Manchester, near Williamson's former home. Her sculpture has been described as "striking and truly captivating".

She was elected a member of the Royal Society of Sculptors in 1996 and of the Society of Portrait Sculptors in 2002.
