= AgDevCo =

Social impact investor in African agriculture

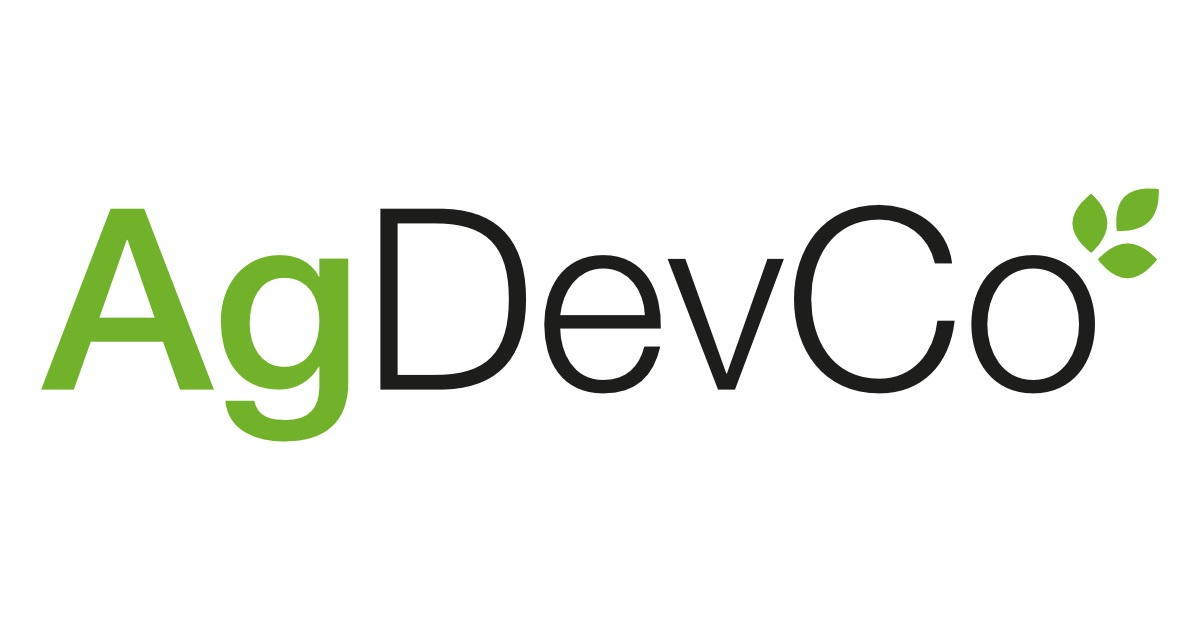
AgDevCo logo

AgDevCo is a social impact investor and project developer working in the African agriculture sector. The company supports small and medium-sized enterprises (SMEs) involved in farming, agriprocessing, and logistics, with the aim of creating jobs and income-earning opportunities for African farmers. With a portfolio of more than 50 debt and equity investments across ten countries (average investment size of US$3m), AgDevCo is one of the most active SME investors in the African agriculture sector. AgDevCo is backed by the UK government, and operates on a not-for-profit basis; all returns are reinvested into new projects.
