= Elizabeth Andrews =

Welsh politician

Elizabeth Andrews OBE JP

Personal details
- Born: Elizabeth Smith; 15 December 1882 Hirwaun, Cynon Valley, Wales
- Died: 22 January 1960 (aged 77) Ton Pentre
- Party: Welsh Labour
- Spouse: Tom Andrews
- Occupation: politician, suffragist

Elizabeth Andrews OBE JP (née Smith; 15 December 1882 – 22 January 1960) was a Welsh politician and suffragist who was the first woman organiser of the Labour Party in Wales.

== Early life ==
Andrews was born on 15 December 1882 at 13 John Street, Hirwaun in the Cynon Valley into a Welsh speaking mining family of Charlotte (née Evans) and Samuel Smith, one of eleven children (two of whom died during childhood). She lived in Station Road, Hirwaun, and was obliged to leave school at the age of twelve, in order to help at home. She worked as a dress maker and moved to the Rhondda aged of 26 where she met her husband Tom. Her experiences there of the social issues affecting the mining community were the start of her political campaigning.

== Activism ==
Andrews wrote to the press in support of Evan Roberts and the 1904–1905 Welsh revival which gained her some attention. She joined the women's suffrage movement at about the same time. She was one of three women who gave evidence before the Sankey Commission in 1918, speaking before the House of Lords, along with two English miners' wives. This ultimately led to the introduction of pit head showers at British mines in 1924. Previously miners went home utterly filthy with the dust from the mines. Miners' houses at the time had no indoor bathrooms or hot water plumbing, so until the introduction of these showers, their wives had to boil and carry water for washing in tin baths and clean up the resulting dirt and dry washing inside their small houses. This had a deleterious impact on the women's health and that of their children.

During the 1926 miners' lockout, she and Beatrice Green helped create a programme to temporarily foster 2,500 vulnerable children. Her work to provide support for miners and their families continued into the Great Depression of the 1930s.

As soon as some women received the vote in 1918, the Labour Party appointed four female organisers, of whom Andrews was one. She campaigned tirelessly for health and education services. One of her great successes was the opening of the first nursery school in Wales in the Rhondda in 1938. She was named an Officer of the Most Excellent Order of the British Empire in 1948 for her services as a justice of the peace in Ystrad Rhondda.

== Commemoration ==
In 2004, she came 100th in the on-line poll to find 100 Welsh Heroes with a total of 37 votes. In 2006 her book A Woman's Work is Never Done, originally printed in 1952, was reprinted following a revival of interest in her work led by Glenys Kinnock. Andrews was one of five women shortlisted in 2018 for the first statue of a woman to be erected in Cardiff. In 2025 there was a plan to commission a statue of her by the organisation Monumental Welsh Women. The statue was unveiled on 25 June 2026 in Rhondda Heritage Park. It was cast in bronze and made by the sculptor Billie Bond. It shows Andrews life-sized along with a small child, modelled on Rhona Allen from mining family in Llwynypia, Rhondda.

== Works ==
- Elizabeth Andrews (2006). A Woman's Work is Never Done. Honno Ltd. ISBN 978-1-870206-78-5.
