= Sarah Jane Rees =

Welsh teacher, poet and temperance campaigner, 1839–1916

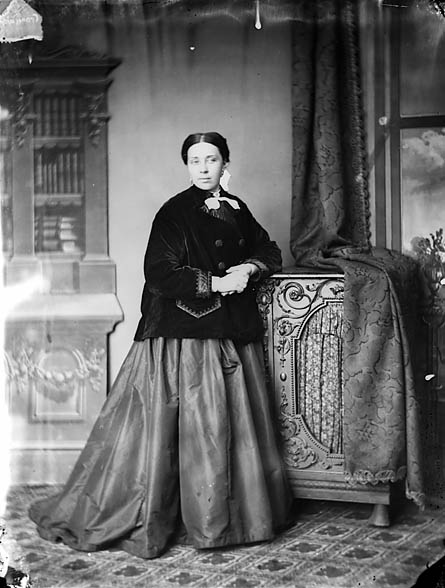
- Rees, about 1875
- Born: 9 January 1839; Llangrannog, Wales
- Died: 27 June 1916 (aged 77); Cilfynydd, Wales
- Burial place: St Crannogs, Cilfynydd
- Occupations: Teacher; poet; magazine editor; temperance activist
- Era: Victorian era, Edwardian era
- Organizations: South Wales Women's Temperance Union (UDMD); Cymdeithas Merched y De

Sarah Jane Rees (9 January 1839 – 27 June 1916), also known by the bardic name "Cranogwen", was a Welsh teacher, poet, editor, master mariner and temperance campaigner. She had two romantic friendships with women, first with 'Phania' Fanny Rees, until her death from tuberculosis, then with Jane Thomas, for most of the rest of Rees's life.

== Early life ==
Sarah Jane Rees was born at Llangrannog in Cardiganshire, the daughter of mariner John Rees. She received early education at the village school. A precocious child, she insisted she must accompany her father to sea rather than do sewing and cooking chores at home, which she hated. However, this was not so unusual: many wives and daughters accompanied men in local ships, trading up and down the coasts on family business.

Rees was initially educated locally by an old schoolmaster called Hugh Davies, who taught her Latin and astronomy. She later attended school in Cardigan and New Quay, and for a time studied at a navigation school in London, where she gained her master's certificate, a qualification allowing her to command a ship in any part of the world.

In 1859 Sarah Jane set up her own navigation school in her home village of Llangrannog.

== Career ==
In 1865, competing at Aberystwyth against men such as William Thomas (Islwyn) and John Ceiriog Hughes (Ceiriog), she won her first major Eisteddfod prize, for "Y Fodrwy Briodasol (The Wedding Ring)", in the Song category. A book of poems, Caniadau Cranogwen, followed this in 1870.

Rees went on a tour of Wales in 1866–1867, giving lectures with a charge of 6d for a ticket. The profits from the sales to large audiences paid off debts for several chapels. The audience in the Brynhyfryd Chapel in Swansea numbered nearly 1,000 people. She was both a lecturer and a religious preacher.

She gave a lecture entitled Yr Ieuengctyd a Diwylliant eu Meddyliau (transl.The young, and the culture of their minds) at the Independent Chapel, Bridgend (Brynmenyn) on 2 January 1867, and an admission ticket from the event is preserved in the collections of Amgueddfa Cymru, National Museum Wales. Contemporary reports in the Welsh-language newspapers indicated that her lecture was very well received and as her tour progressed she shared the stage with local dignitaries.

While teaching navigation and other subjects, she also became editor of the Welsh-language women's periodical Y Frythones (1878–1889), a "platform for Welsh bluestockings and proto-suffragettes". It had a problem page and also campaigned for girls' education. This periodical also provided the first opportunities for publication of work by significant authors including Mary Oliver Jones and Ellen Hughes. In 1869–1870, she toured the United States, addressing mainly Welsh emigrant communities as far west as California. She was one of the founders of the South Wales Women's Temperance Union (Undeb Dirwestol Merched y De, U.D.M.D.) in 1901, and by her death in 1916 there were 140 branches throughout South Wales.

== Personal life ==
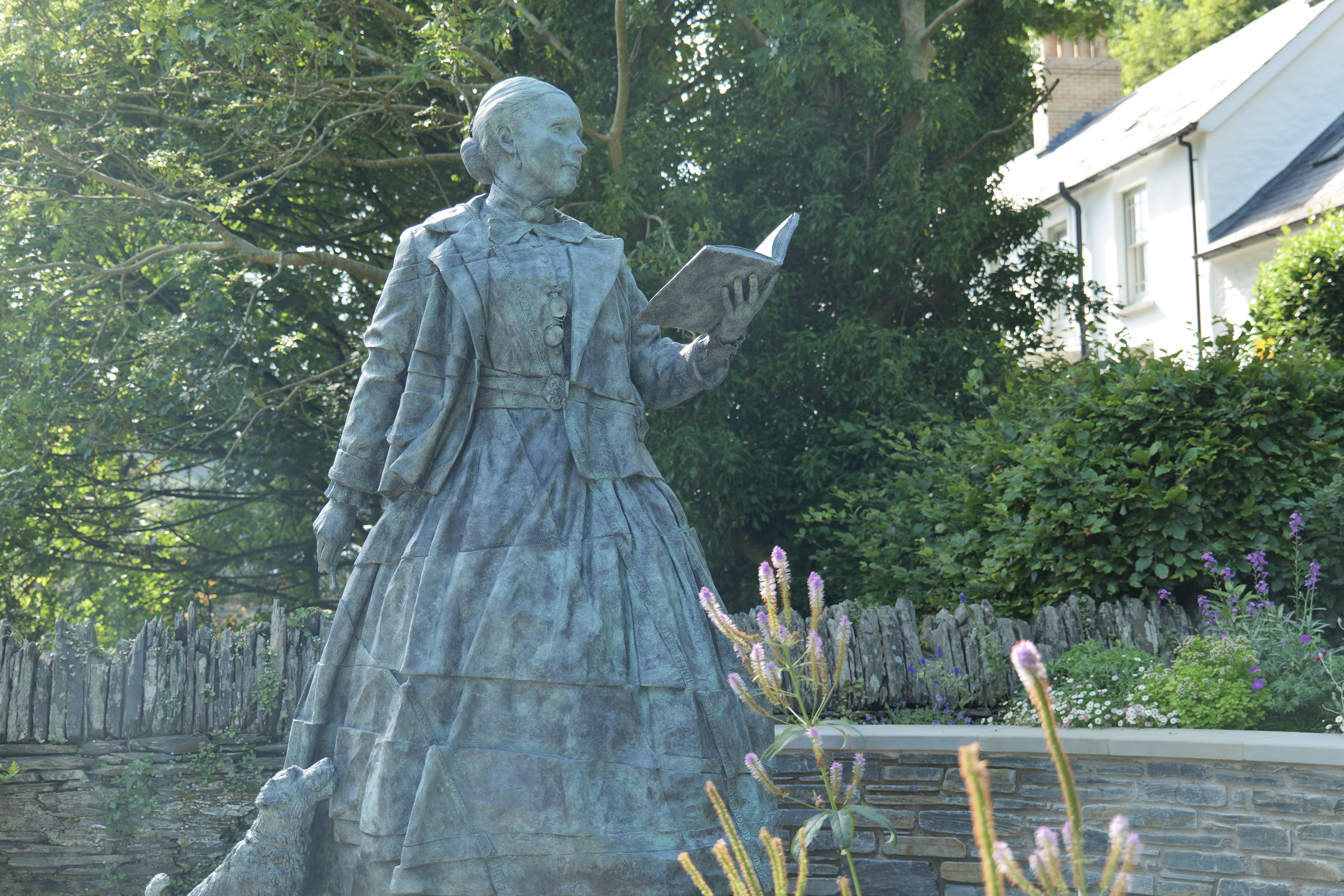
Cranogwen Statue, Llangrannog, 2023

Rees had two significant same-sex relationships, previously described as romantic friendships. Her first was with Fanny Rees (1853-1874), a milliner's daughter from Troedyraur, near Llangrannog. Rees called Fanny “Phania” but she contracted tuberculosis and returned to Wales around 1874 to die. She moved into Rees' home rather than that of her family, and died in her arms, aged only 21. Rees was so affected that for 12 years she was unable to put flowers on Fanny's grave. She commemorated Fanny in one of her best-known poems, Fy Ffrind (My Friend).

Her second relationship, with Jane Thomas (1850-?), lasted for most of her life. Open about this unconventional arrangement, Rees still remained a committed Methodist and toured giving lectures on education, temperance and other subjects.

In the last twenty years of her life, she created and devoted a great deal of effort towards the 'Cymdeithas Merched y De' (Women's society of the South), a movement which supported sobriety.

Rees died on 27 June 1916 at Cilfynydd and was buried in St Crannogs churchyard, where her grave was marked by a large elaborate obelisk.

== Legacy ==
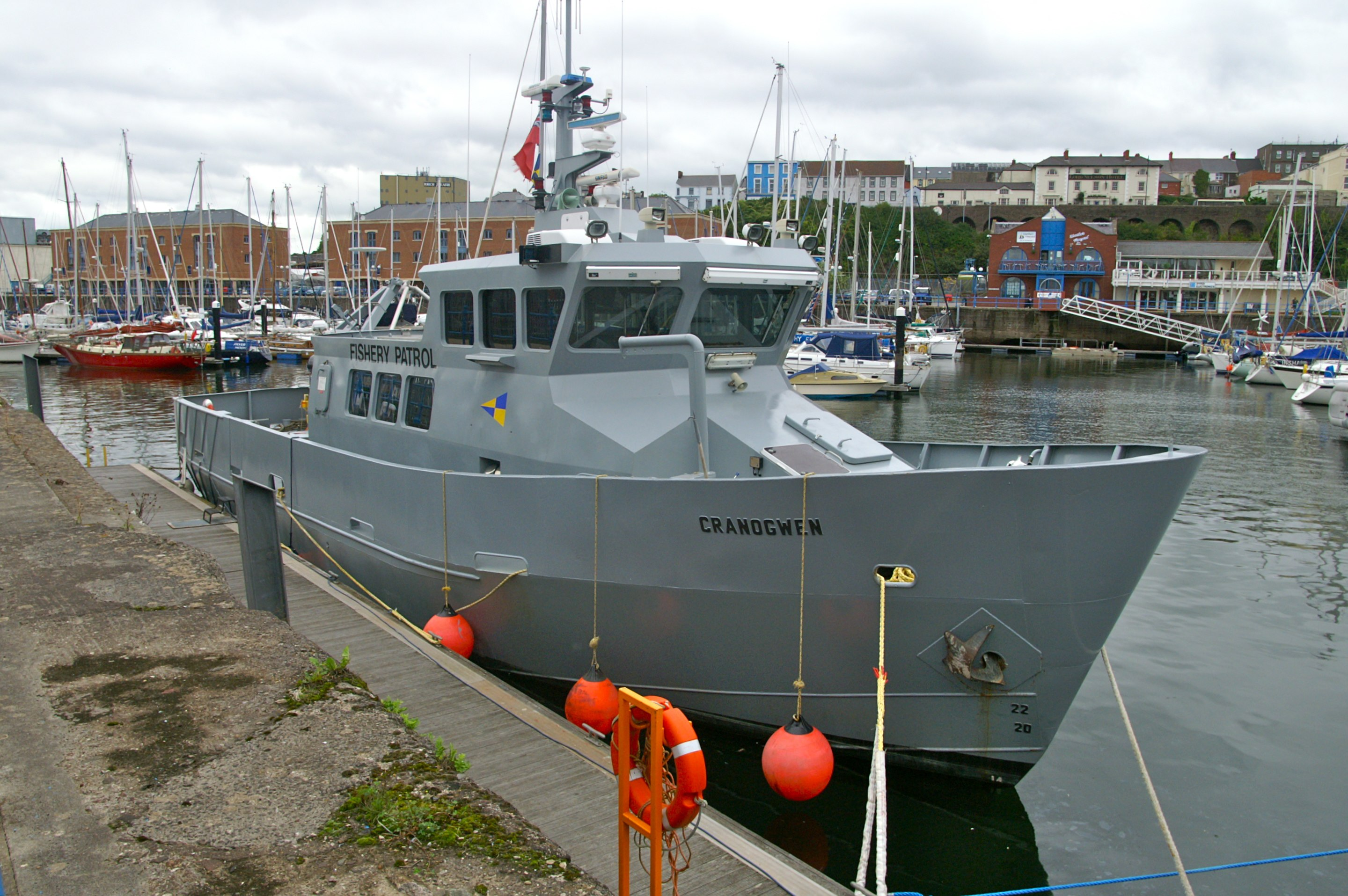
Cranogwen Fishery Patrol Vessel docked at Milford Haven, 2010

A shelter for homeless women and girls, Lletty Cranogwen was founded in the Rhondda valley in 1922 by the South Wales Women's Temperance Union and named to mark Rees's work to improve Welsh women's lives.

There is a fisheries patrol vessel used by the Welsh Government based in Milford Haven that has been named after Cranogwen.

In 2019 Rees was among five women shortlisted as the subject for an artwork to be installed in Cardiff. In December 2021 Sebastien Boyesen was commissioned to create a figurative sculpture of Cranogwen in Llangrannog, the third commissioned by the Monumental Welsh Women statue campaign. The statue was unveiled in a ceremony commemorating her life on 10 June 2023. A theatre show about Cranogwen toured Wales in late 2022 to publicise the statue, involving Mewn Cymeriad Theatre Company, Monumental Welsh Women and other organisations.

Rees is an off-stage character in a crime novel by Alis Hawkins, A Bitter Remedy (2023).

== Bibliography ==
- John, Angela V., ed. (1991). Our Mothers' Land, Chapters in Welsh Women's History 1830–1939. Cardiff: University of Wales Press. ISBN 0-7083-1129-6.
- Shopland, Norena (2017). Forbidden Lives: LGBT stories from Wales. Bridgend: Seren Books. ISBN 978-1781724101.
