= 1995 Cardiff Council election =

1995 Welsh local council election

- 4 May 1995

All 67 seats to Cardiff Council 34 seats needed for a majority

	First party	Second party	Third party
Party	Labour	Liberal Democrats	Conservative
Seats won	56	9	1
Seat change	N/A	N/A	N/A
Popular vote	133,992	40,633	38,851
	Fourth party
Party	Plaid Cymru
Seats won	1
Seat change	N/A
Popular vote	7,428
Council control before election
N/A
Council control after election
Labour

The 1995 Cardiff Council election was the first election to the new unitary County Council of the City and County of Cardiff following the re-organization of local government in Wales. It was held on Thursday 4 May 1995. It was followed by the 1999 elections. On the same day there were elections to the other 21 local authorities in Wales and community councils in Wales. Labour won a majority of the seats. It was preceded in Cardiff by the 1991 elections to Cardiff City Council and the 1993 elections to South Glamorgan County Council.

== Overview ==
All council seats were up for election. These were the first elections held following local government reorganisation, which created new 'super authorities' and would lead to the abolition of South Glamorgan County Council on 1 April 1996. Cardiff councillors would act in a shadow capacity to the new Cardiff Council, until the following April.

The ward boundaries for the new authority were based on the previous Cardiff City Council. In addition, the Creigiau ward which was previously within Taff Ely Borough Council was included within the new authority.

== Candidates ==
All 67 seats were contested by the Labour Party and the Liberal Democrats, whilst the Conservative Party contested 58, and Plaid Cymru contested 28. The majority of the sitting members on the two previous authorities stood for election.

Members of the Cardiff City Council prior to the election are denoted with *

Members of South Glamorgan County Council prior to the election are denoted with +

== Outcome ==
Labour won an overwhelming majority, including wards that had been held on predecessor councils by the Conservatives for many years. A number of long-serving Conservative councillors failed to be elected. The Liberal Democrats captured wards where they had been successful in the past but the party also lost some ground. Plaid Cymru had their first Cardiff councillor elected for 27 years, in the Creigiau ward.

Cardiff Council election result 1995
Party	Seats	Gains	Losses	Net gain/loss	Seats %	Votes %	Votes	+/−
Labour	56	56	N/A	N/A	83.5	58.31	133,992	N/A
Liberal Democrats	9	9	N/A	N/A	13.4	17.68	40,633	N/A
Conservative	1	1	N/A	N/A	1.5	16.91	38,851	N/A
Plaid Cymru	1	1	N/A	N/A	1.5	3.23	7,428	N/A
Independent	0	0	N/A	N/A	0.0	2.03	4,676	N/A
Green	0	0	N/A	N/A	0.0	1.67	3,839	N/A
Communist	0	0	N/A	N/A	0.0	0.17	391	N/A

== Ward results ==
=== Adamsdown (2 seats) ===
Adamsdown
Party	Candidate	Votes	%	±%
Labour	Kenneth Hutchings+	1,201	47.5	N/A
Labour	L. Glaister*	954		
Liberal Democrats	Nigel Howells	733	29.0	N/A
Liberal Democrats	John Dixon	688		
Independent	William Herbert*	422	16.7	N/A
Plaid Cymru	Steffan Wiliam	124	4.9	N/A
Communist	F. Rawlings	46	1.8	N/A
Turnout			40.5	N/A
Registered electors		5,413		
Labour win (new seat)				
Labour win (new seat)				

Former city mayor, Bill Herbert, was rejected as Labour's candidate in favour of South Glamorgan councillor and county highways chairman, Ken Hutchings. Herbert stood as an Independent.

=== Butetown (1 seat) ===
Butetown
Party	Candidate	Votes	%	±%
Labour	Ben Foday+	648	78.3	N/A
Plaid Cymru	M. Chambers	69	8.3	N/A
Conservative	Ronald Thomas	63	7.6	N/A
Liberal Democrats	K. Hassan	48	5.8	N/A
Turnout			31.1	N/A
Registered electors		2,676		
Labour win (new seat)				

=== Caerau (2 seats) ===
Caerau
Party	Candidate	Votes	%	±%
Liberal Democrats	Jacqui Gasson*+	1,562	48.8	N/A
Labour	Harry Ernest*	1,488	46.5	N/A
Labour	Julie Mawn	1,282		
Liberal Democrats	Roger Burley+	1,268		
Conservative	H. Evans	93	2.9	N/A
Conservative	Wendy Rees	92		
Plaid Cymru	C. Woodard	56	1.8	N/A
Turnout			41.2	N/A
Registered electors		7,478		
Liberal Democrats win (new seat)				
Labour win (new seat)				

=== Canton (3 seats) ===
Canton
Party	Candidate	Votes	%	±%
Labour	Kevin Brennan*	2,716	51.6	N/A
Labour	Cherry Short*+	2,431		
Labour	David Thomas*	2,358		
Liberal Democrats	C. Warren	1,218	23.1	N/A
Liberal Democrats	A. Wigley	730		
Liberal Democrats	S. White	719		
Conservative	N. Durbin	542	10.3	N/A
Plaid Cymru	P. Daley	444	8.4	N/A
Green	Vivien Turner	344	6.5	N/A
Turnout			41.7	N/A
Registered electors		10,394		
Labour win (new seat)				
Labour win (new seat)				
Labour win (new seat)				

=== Cathays (3 seats) ===
Cathays
Party	Candidate	Votes	%	±%
Labour	Sarah Merry	2,022	40.6	N/A
Liberal Democrats	Fred Hornblow*	1,884	37.8	N/A
Labour	Kathryn-Ann Slade	1,837		
Labour	Gerard Moreton	1,723		
Liberal Democrats	Simon Wakefield	1,701		
Liberal Democrats	Robin Rowland+	1,662		
Green	N. Clark	491	9.9	N/A
Plaid Cymru	Terence O'Neill	447	9.0	N/A
Communist	Robert Griffiths	137	2.8	N/A
Turnout			37.8	N/A
Registered electors		11,485		
Labour win (new seat)				
Liberal Democrats win (new seat)				
Labour win (new seat)				

=== Creigiau (1 seat) ===
Creigiau
Party	Candidate	Votes	%	±%
Plaid Cymru	Delme Bowen	436	43.2	N/A
Labour	S. Jones	226	22.4	N/A
Independent	A. Thomas-Barton	223	22.1	N/A
Conservative	J. Greenwood	101	10.0	N/A
Liberal Democrats	J. Frankham-Barnes	24	2.4	N/A
Turnout			48.6	N/A
Registered electors		2,078		
Plaid Cymru win (new seat)				

=== Cyncoed (3 seats) ===
Cyncoed
Party	Candidate	Votes	%	±%
Liberal Democrats	Jenny Randerson*	2,718	56.8	N/A
Liberal Democrats	T. Pickets*+	2,694		
Liberal Democrats	J. Pryce	2,531		
Conservative	A. Baker	1,123	23.5	N/A
Conservative	J. Dickson	1,113		
Conservative	S. Williams	1,048		
Labour	Diane Owen	664	13.9	N/A
Labour	J. Anderson	658		
Labour	C. Bonnett	597		
Plaid Cymru	W. Vernon	157	3.3	N/A
Green	D. Corker	123	2.6	N/A
Turnout			52.2	N/A
Registered electors		8,777		
Liberal Democrats win (new seat)				
Liberal Democrats win (new seat)				
Liberal Democrats win (new seat)				

=== Ely (3 seats) ===
Ely
Party	Candidate	Votes	%	±%
Labour	Brian Finn	2,383	77.6	N/A
Labour	T. Davies*	2,200		
Labour	Russell Goodway+	2,053		
Conservative	M. Rees	282	9.3	N/A
Conservative	J. Osmond	278		
Conservative	D. Philpott	249		
Liberal Democrats	S. Coles	231	7.6	N/A
Liberal Democrats	A. Burns	202		
Liberal Democrats	S. Kinch	198		
Plaid Cymru	L. Haries	168	5.5	N/A
Turnout			29.0	N/A
Registered electors		10,696		
Labour win (new seat)				
Labour win (new seat)				
Labour win (new seat)				

=== Fairwater (3 seats) ===
Fairwater
Party	Candidate	Votes	%	±%
Labour	Maxwell Phillips*	2,576	72.4	N/A
Labour	T. Ward*	2,464		
Labour	Derek Rees+	2,311		
Conservative	D. Marks	401	11.3	N/A
Conservative	C. Trigg	361		
Liberal Democrats	J. Evans	350	9.8	N/A
Conservative	R. Trigg	343		
Liberal Democrats	Peter Borrow	258		
Liberal Democrats	S. Pye	240		
Plaid Cymru	H. Jones	233	6.5	N/A
Turnout			34.0	N/A
Registered electors		10,182		
Labour win (new seat)				
Labour win (new seat)				
Labour win (new seat)				

=== Gabalfa (1 seat) ===
Gabalfa
Party	Candidate	Votes	%	±%
Labour	Jean Wilkinson	1,221	70.2	N/A
Conservative	V. Kempton	189	10.9	N/A
Liberal Democrats	Cathy Pearcy	158	9.1	N/A
Plaid Cymru	A. Fearon	118	6.8	N/A
Green	J. Rowlands	53	3.0	N/A
Turnout			32.7	N/A
Registered electors		5,330		
Labour win (new seat)				

=== Grangetown (3 seats) ===
Grangetown
Party	Candidate	Votes	%	±%
Labour	John Smith*	2,244	58.5	N/A
Labour	Peter Perkins+	2,196		
Labour	Lynda Thorne*	2,168		
Conservative	W. Jones	614	16.0	N/A
Conservative	A. Mountstephen	570		
Conservative	W. Selwood	549		
Independent	C. Dimond	367	9.6	N/A
Liberal Democrats	M. Islam	243	6.3	N/A
Liberal Democrats	L. Luxton	227		
Plaid Cymru	D. Williams	214	5.6	N/A
Liberal Democrats	M. Verma	183		
Green	K. Shaw	152	4.0	N/A
Turnout			35.8	N/A
Registered electors		9,621		
Labour win (new seat)				
Labour win (new seat)				
Labour win (new seat)				

=== Heath (3 seats) ===
Heath
Party	Candidate	Votes	%	±%
Labour	Graham Hinchey+	1,892	35.6	N/A
Labour	R. Longworth	1,813		
Liberal Democrats	Fenella Bowden	1,786	33.6	N/A
Labour	Paul Mitchell	1,765		
Liberal Democrats	J. James	1,689		
Liberal Democrats	G. Harris	1,677		
Conservative	Tony John+	1,204	22.7	N/A
Conservative	Greville Tatham*	1,160		
Conservative	Wayne Warlow	1,037		
Green	M. Evans	221	4.2	N/A
Plaid Cymru	Nans Couch	205	3.9	N/A
Turnout			54.1	N/A
Registered electors		9,358		
Labour win (new seat)				
Labour win (new seat)				
Liberal Democrats win (new seat)				

=== Lisvane and St Mellons (1 seat) ===
Lisvane and St Mellons
Party	Candidate	Votes	%	±%
Conservative	J. Richards*	1,099	55.7	N/A
Labour	I. Rees	466	23.6	N/A
Liberal Democrats	J. Miller	279	14.1	N/A
Plaid Cymru	J. Jones	72	3.6	N/A
Green	H. O'Connor	58	2.9	N/A
Turnout			39.8	N/A
Registered electors		4,969		
Conservative win (new seat)				

=== Llandaff (2 seats) ===
Llandaff
Party	Candidate	Votes	%	±%
Labour	Gregory Owens	1,568	44.0	N/A
Labour	John Sheppard	1,460		
Conservative	Julius Hermer*+	1,173	32.9	N/A
Conservative	M. Jones*	1,121		
Plaid Cymru	Keith Bush	339	9.5	N/A
Liberal Democrats	E. Williams	303	8.5	N/A
Liberal Democrats	M. Kettle	296		
Green	F. James	184	5.2	N/A
Turnout			47.2	N/A
Registered electors		7,074		
Labour win (new seat)				
Labour win (new seat)				

=== Llandaff North (2 seats) ===
Llandaff North
Party	Candidate	Votes	%	±%
Labour	Anthony Earle	1,850	71.7	N/A
Labour	M. Matthewson*	1,755		
Conservative	J. Marshall	268	10.4	N/A
Liberal Democrats	A. James	253	9.8	N/A
Conservative	P. Gough	225		
Liberal Democrats	D. Wright	137		
Plaid Cymru	E. Eckley	122	4.7	N/A
Green	R. Thomas	87	3.4	N/A
Turnout			41.5	N/A
Registered electors		5,978		
Labour win (new seat)				
Labour win (new seat)				

=== Llanishen (3 seats) ===
Llanishen
Party	Candidate	Votes	%	±%
Labour	Garry Hunt*	3,367	57.9	N/A
Labour	Nicholas Butler+	3,240		
Labour	Christopher Bettinson+	3,167		
Conservative	P. Tatham*	1,532	26.3	N/A
Conservative	E. Morgan-Roberts	1,148		
Conservative	J. Strong	1,138		
Liberal Democrats	J. Brent	616	10.6	N/A
Liberal Democrats	Veronica Hallett	593		
Liberal Democrats	W. Monkley	443		
Plaid Cymru	W. Cross	301	5.2	N/A
Turnout			48.6	N/A
Registered electors		11,331		
Labour win (new seat)				
Labour win (new seat)				
Labour win (new seat)				

=== Llanrumney (3 seats) ===
Llanrumney
Party	Candidate	Votes	%	±%
Labour	Gillian Bird*	2,445	67.4	N/A
Labour	Brian James*	2,306		
Labour	John Phillips*	2,112		
Independent	D. Stephanakis	365	10.1	N/A
Conservative	E. Woods	269	7.4	N/A
Conservative	J. Summerhayes	261		
Conservative	F. Prew	215		
Green	P. Llewellyn	214	5.9	N/A
Plaid Cymru	E. Lewis	181	5.0	N/A
Liberal Democrats	Philip Bramhall	152	4.2	N/A
Liberal Democrats	K. Ali	77		
Liberal Democrats	A. Ali	75		
Turnout			36.3	N/A
Registered electors		8,664		
Labour win (new seat)				
Labour win (new seat)				
Labour win (new seat)				

=== Pentwyn (3 seats) ===
Pentwyn
Party	Candidate	Votes	%	±%
Labour	Vita Jones+	2,556	69.7	N/A
Labour	Brian Pinnell	2,249		
Labour	James Regan	2,223		
Liberal Democrats	P. Ribton	569	15.5	N/A
Liberal Democrats	J. Walklett	558		
Liberal Democrats	D. Hourahane	486		
Conservative	J. Goodwin	285	7.8	N/A
Plaid Cymru	G. Davies	256	7.0	N/A
Conservative	A. Dickson	238		
Conservative	C. Peterson	236		
Turnout			31.3	N/A
Registered electors		11,299		
Labour win (new seat)				
Labour win (new seat)				
Labour win (new seat)				

=== Pentyrch (1 seat) ===
Pentyrch
Party	Candidate	Votes	%	±%
Labour	Christine Priday	616	43.2	N/A
Plaid Cymru	Colin Palfrey	426	29.9	N/A
Independent	M. Henderson	328	23.0	N/A
Green	A. Jones	38	2.7	N/A
Liberal Democrats	J. Kenner	17	1.2	N/A
Turnout			52.9	N/A
Registered electors		2,716		
Labour win (new seat)				

=== Plasnewydd (4 seats) ===
Plasnewydd
Party	Candidate	Votes	%	±%
Labour	A. Cox*	3,121	56.2	N/A
Labour	Susan Lent+	3,103		
Labour	P. Morris*	2,883		
Labour	Julie Morgan+	2,845		
Plaid Cymru	E. Parish	676	12.2	N/A
Liberal Democrats	D. Powell	654	11.8	N/A
Liberal Democrats	Mark Stephens	610		
Green	Chris Von Ruhland	558	10.0	N/A
Liberal Democrats	Rodney Berman	550		
Liberal Democrats	A. Veasey	517		
Conservative	D. Munton	391	7.0	N/A
Conservative	D. Shorter	388		
Conservative	J. Munton	371		
Conservative	M. Williams	358		
Communist	C. Eliassen	155	2.8	N/A
Turnout			35.2	
Registered electors		12,949		
Labour win (new seat)				
Labour win (new seat)				
Labour win (new seat)				
Labour win (new seat)				

=== Radyr & St Fagans (1 seat) ===
Radyr & St Fagans
Party	Candidate	Votes	%	±%
Labour	Marion Drake+	1,421	67.6	N/A
Conservative	C. Kolmar	502	23.9	N/A
Liberal Democrats	S. Barker	91	4.3	N/A
Plaid Cymru	Eluned Bush	87	4.1	N/A
Turnout			51.9	N/A
Registered electors		4,043		
Labour win (new seat)				

=== Rhiwbina (3 seats) ===
Rhiwbina
Party	Candidate	Votes	%	±%
Labour	P. Owen	2,198	41.0	N/A
Labour	F. Bowrhay	2,178		
Labour	S. Moore	2,095		
Conservative	M. Davies*	1,921	35.8	N/A
Conservative	Jeffrey Sainsbury*	1,900		
Conservative	Gareth Neale*+	1,875		
Liberal Democrats	R. Nute	768	14.3	N/A
Liberal Democrats	J. Nute	764		
Liberal Democrats	P. Wilkins	694		
Plaid Cymru	Falmai Griffiths	291	5.4	N/A
Green	S. Fletcher	182	3.4	N/A
Turnout			54.5	N/A
Registered electors		9,389		
Labour win (new seat)				
Labour win (new seat)				
Labour win (new seat)				

=== Riverside (3 seats) ===
Riverside
Party	Candidate	Votes	%	±%
Labour	R. Brown*	2,346	58.4	N/A
Labour	Sue Essex*	2,341		
Labour	J. Singh+	2,143		
Plaid Cymru	Penny Bestic	540	13.5	N/A
Green	P. Lukes	448	11.2	N/A
Liberal Democrats	N. Roberts	348	8.7	N/A
Conservative	W. Donaldson	332	8.3	N/A
Conservative	M. Evans	322		
Liberal Democrats	R. Hewlett	191		
Liberal Democrats	R. Fawcett	172		
Turnout			37.2	N/A
Registered electors		9,008		
Labour win (new seat)				
Labour win (new seat)				
Labour win (new seat)				

=== Roath (3 seats) ===
Roath
Party	Candidate	Votes	%	±%
Liberal Democrats	Freda Salway*	2,101	47.0	N/A
Liberal Democrats	M. Michaelis*	2,081		
Liberal Democrats	R. Michaelis+	2,024		
Labour	Ralph Rees	1,204	26.9	N/A
Labour	W. Cookson	1,150		
Labour	R. Surridge	1,034		
Conservative	G. Hughes	669	15.0	N/A
Conservative	J. Baker	662		
Conservative	D. Williams	602		
Plaid Cymru	T. Davies	278	6.2	N/A
Green	P. Ward	218	4.9	N/A
Turnout			41.2	N/A
Registered electors		10,112		
Liberal Democrats win (new seat)				
Liberal Democrats win (new seat)				
Liberal Democrats win (new seat)				

=== Rumney (2 seats) ===
Rumney
Party	Candidate	Votes	%	±%
Labour	D. Francies	1,557	61.1	N/A
Labour	S. Pantak	1,281		
Independent	J. Sage	567	22.3	N/A
Independent	U. Natale	546		
Conservative	A. McCarthy	263	10.3	N/A
Conservative	A. Hollands	241		
Liberal Democrats	T. Lewis	95	3.7	N/A
Plaid Cymru	D. Reeves	65	2.6	N/A
Liberal Democrats	R. Verma	56		
Turnout			36.5	N/A
Registered electors		6,736		
Labour win (new seat)				
Labour win (new seat)				

=== Splott (2 seats) ===
Splott
Party	Candidate	Votes	%	±%
Labour	Gordon Houlston+	2,414	62.3	N/A
Labour	Clarissa Holland	2,336		
Independent	M. Cook+	1,003	25.9	N/A
Independent	M. Cook	870		
Plaid Cymru	A. O'Neill	158	4.1	N/A
Conservative	F. Arnold	125	3.2	N/A
Liberal Democrats	K. Chubb	119	3.1	N/A
Conservative	A. Thomas	111		
Liberal Democrats	J. Febbo	94		
Communist	D. Macaskill	53	1.4	N/A
Turnout			46.6	N/A
Registered electors		8,167		
Labour win (new seat)				
Labour win (new seat)				

=== Trowbridge (2 seats) ===
Trowbridge
Party	Candidate	Votes	%	±%
Labour	W. Bowen+	1,907	75.0	N/A
Labour	D. English*	1,658		
Conservative	R. Hollands	231	9.1	N/A
Conservative	J. McCarthy	177		
Liberal Democrats	M. Barradine	175	6.9	N/A
Liberal Democrats	C. Elliott	171		
Green	K. Moss	123	4.8	N/A
Plaid Cymru	J. Davies	105	4.1	N/A
Turnout			27.8	N/A
Registered electors		9,016		
Labour win (new seat)				
Labour win (new seat)				

=== Whitchurch & Tongwynlais (4 seats) ===
Whitchurch & Tongwynlais
Party	Candidate	Votes	%	±%
Labour	W. Salmon+	3,592	48.6	N/A
Labour	A. Fennessy+	3,416		
Labour	K. Price	3,166		
Labour	R. Pearson	3,132		
Conservative	W. Griffiths*	1,980	26.8	N/A
Conservative	Brian John Griffiths*	1,676		
Conservative	Victor Riley*	1,676		
Conservative	D. Morgan	1,458		
Plaid Cymru	Gareth Pierce	860	11.6	N/A
Liberal Democrats	S. Spear	613	8.3	N/A
Liberal Democrats	A. Evans	612		
Liberal Democrats	G. Mellem	569		
Liberal Democrats	G. Hallett	507		
Green	S. Martin	345	4.7	N/A
Turnout			52.5	N/A
Registered electors		11,878		
Labour win (new seat)				
Labour win (new seat)				
Labour win (new seat)				
Labour win (new seat)				

== By-elections between 1995 and 1999 ==
=== Fairwater ===
Fairwater by-election, 10 April 1997
Party	Candidate	Votes	%	±%
Labour	Michael Michael	1,527	70.9	−1.5
Conservative		388	18.0	+6.7
Liberal Democrats		237	11.0	+1.2
Majority		1,139	52.9	N/A
Turnout				
Registered electors				
Labour hold		Swing		

=== Plasnewydd ===
Plasnewydd by-election, 18 September 1997
Party	Candidate	Votes	%	±%
Labour	Geoff Mungham	1,944	46.3	−9.9
Liberal Democrats		1,398	33.3	+21.5
Conservative		457	10.9	+3.9
Green		260	6.2	−3.9
Socialist Labour		140	3.3	N/A
Majority		546	13.0	N/A
Turnout			30.3	−4.9
Registered electors				
Labour hold		Swing		

The by-election was called following the election of Cllr. Julie Morgan as the Member for the Parliamentary constituency of Cardiff North.

=== Rhiwbina ===
Rhiwbina by-election, 3 September 1998
Party	Candidate	Votes	%	±%
Conservative	Gareth Neale	1,881	45.5	+9.7
Labour		1,096	26.5	−14.5
Liberal Democrats		966	23.3	+9.0
Plaid Cymru		189	4.5	−0.9
Majority		785	19.0	N/A
Turnout			43.3	−11.2
Registered electors				
Conservative gain from Labour		Swing		
