= 1987 Cardiff City Council election =

Local election in Cardiff, Wales

The 1987 Cardiff City Council election was held on Thursday 7 May 1987 to the district council known as Cardiff City Council, in Cardiff, South Glamorgan, Wales. It took place on the same day as other district council elections in Wales and England. The Conservative Party lost control of the council, though the Labour Party were unable to regain an overall majority.

The previous Cardiff City Council election took place in 1983 and the next full elections took place in 1991.

== Overview ==
Prior to the elections the Conservatives had a majority of three on the council. National opinion polls showed Labour was gaining in popularity, particularly on local issues. In Cardiff the Conservatives were also facing a challenge from the SDP-Liberal Alliance.

All 65 council seats were up for election, in 26 electoral wards. The Conservatives lost ten seats overall, while Labour increased their representation by one. The Alliance won nine additional seats, particularly in the centre of the city, within the boundaries of the Cardiff Central constituency. Labour became the largest party, though four short of having a majority. The Labour group leader, John Reynolds, pledged to run a minority administration. A coalition was later agreed between Labour, the Conservatives and the Alliance, with Alliance leader Mike German serving as co-leader alongside Labour's Alun Michael from 1987 until 1991.

Prominent councillors who lost their seats included former Lord Mayor, Olwen Watkin; the council's finance chairman, Roy Hennessy; and Tony John, chairman of Cardiff Bus. In the Gabalfa ward a police investigation was launched into alleged voting irregularities after the winning Labour councillor, David Hutchinson, had increased his majority to four times more than his 1983 result.

Cardiff Council election result 1987
| Party | Seats | Gains | Losses | Net gain/loss | Seats % | Votes % | Votes | +/− |
|---|---|---|---|---|---|---|---|---|
| Labour | 29 | 1 | 0 | +1 | 44.6 | | | |
| Conservative | 24 | 0 | -10 | -10 | 36.9 | | | |
| Alliance | 12 | 9 | 0 | +9 | 18.5 | | | |
| Green | 0 | 0 | 0 | ±0.0 | 0.0 | | | |
| Plaid Cymru | 0 | 0 | 0 | ±0.0 | 0.0 | | | |
| Communist | 0 | 0 | 0 | ±0.0 | 0.0 | | | |
| Ind. Socialist | 0 | 0 | 0 | ±0.0 | 0.0 | | 81 | N/A |

== Ward results ==
Contests were held in all twenty-six wards:^{(a)}^{(b)}

=== Adamsdown (2 seats) ===
Adamsdown
| Party | Candidate | Votes | % | ±% |
|---|---|---|---|---|
| Labour | Jon Owen Jones | 1,196 | 57.6 | +4.2 |
| Labour | W. Herbert * | 1,188 | | |
| Alliance | P. Callaghan | 407 | 19.6 | +9.3 |
| Conservative | D. Munton | 372 | 17.9 | −5.4 |
| Conservative | J. Munton | 350 | | |
| Alliance | J. Berkoles | 327 | | |
| Plaid Cymru | Sian Edwards | 102 | 4.9 | +0.3 |
| Turnout | | | 36.8 | +6.2 |
| Registered electors | | 5,637 | | |
| Labour hold | | Swing | | |
| Labour hold | | Swing | | |

=== Butetown (1 seat) ===
Butetown
| Party | Candidate | Votes | % | ±% |
|---|---|---|---|---|
| Labour | Gaynor Legall* | 700 | 66.4 | −11.2 |
| Conservative | W. Dickens | 269 | 25.5 | +3.1 |
| Alliance | J. Smith | 85 | 8.1 | N/A |
| Turnout | | | 43.3 | +7.6 |
| Registered electors | | 2,432 | | |
| Labour hold | | Swing | | |

=== Caerau (2 seats) ===
Caerau
| Party | Candidate | Votes | % | ±% |
|---|---|---|---|---|
| Labour | W. Carling | 1,633 | 46.9 | −7.7 |
| Labour | David Seligman * | 1,502 | | |
| Alliance | Jacqui Gasson | 1,136 | 32.6 | +19.0 |
| Alliance | J. Williams | 980 | | |
| Conservative | C. Trigg | 593 | 17.0 | −7.6 |
| Conservative | R. Trigg | 587 | | |
| Green | G. Jones | 119 | 3.4 | −3.9 |
| Turnout | | | 46.3 | +10.6 |
| Registered electors | | 7,516 | | |
| Labour hold | | Swing | | |
| Labour hold | | Swing | | |

=== Canton (3 seats) ===
Canton
| Party | Candidate | Votes | % | ±% |
|---|---|---|---|---|
| Conservative | D. Davey * | 2,248 | 39.4 | −11.4 |
| Conservative | Trevor Tyrrell * | 2,235 | | |
| Conservative | I. Jones | 2,203 | | |
| Labour | G. Williams | 2,005 | 35.2 | +2.3 |
| Labour | J. Southern | 1,948 | | |
| Labour | R. Hughes | 1,885 | | |
| Alliance | A. Wigley | 827 | 14.5 | +2.5 |
| Alliance | V. Fox | 826 | | |
| Alliance | J. Denny | 824 | | |
| Green | Vivien Turner | 384 | 6.7 | N/A |
| Plaid Cymru | C. ap Henri | 240 | 4.2 | −0.1 |
| Turnout | | | 54.3 | +6.8 |
| Registered electors | | 10,505 | | |
| Conservative hold | | Swing | | |
| Conservative hold | | Swing | | |
| Conservative hold | | Swing | | |

=== Cathays (3 seats) ===
Cathays
| Party | Candidate | Votes | % | ±% |
|---|---|---|---|---|
| Alliance | Michael German * | 1,992 | 37.6 | +0.7 |
| Labour | Derek Allinson * | 1,984 | 36.9 | +4.5 |
| Alliance | Fred Hornblow * | 1,887 | | |
| Labour | A. Baker | 1,687 | | |
| Alliance | M. Sparkes | 1,684 | | |
| Labour | C. Champion | 1,683 | | |
| Conservative | N. Hutton | 866 | 16.4 | −4.0 |
| Conservative | E. Morgan | 779 | | |
| Conservative | S. Phillips | 749 | | |
| Green | C. von Rhuland | 314 | 5.9 | +1.1 |
| Plaid Cymru | R. Adlam | 168 | 3.2 | −2.3 |
| Plaid Cymru | M. Williams | 152 | | |
| Plaid Cymru | B. Smith | 148 | | |
| Turnout | | | 51.2 | +5.5 |
| Registered electors | | 10,342 | | |
| Alliance hold | | Swing | | |
| Labour hold | | Swing | | |
| Alliance hold | | Swing | | |

=== Cyncoed (3 seats) ===
Cyncoed
| Party | Candidate | Votes | % | ±% |
|---|---|---|---|---|
| Alliance | Jenny Randerson * | 3,055 | 50.7 | +22.9 |
| Alliance | N. Lewis | 2,797 | | |
| Alliance | T. Pickets | 2,708 | | |
| Conservative | Roy Hennesey * | 2,629 | 43.5 | +18.6 |
| Conservative | Anthony John * | 2,518 | | |
| Conservative | L. Jones | 2,458 | | |
| Labour | G. Jenkins | 347 | 5.8 | −4.3 |
| Labour | L. Davis | 303 | | |
| Labour | H. Ernest | 299 | | |
| Turnout | | | 69.7 | +14.1 |
| Registered electors | | 8,641 | | |
| Alliance gain from Conservative | | Swing | | |
| Alliance gain from Conservative | | Swing | | |
| Alliance gain from Conservative | | Swing | | |

=== Ely (3 seats) ===
Ely
| Party | Candidate | Votes | % | ±% |
|---|---|---|---|---|
| Labour | A. Buttle * | 2,361 | 58.8 | +11.1 |
| Labour | M. Buttle * | 2,316 | | |
| Labour | Charlie Gale * | 2,207 | | |
| Conservative | A. Clark | 842 | 21.0 | −12.1 |
| Conservative | J. Courtis | 819 | | |
| Alliance | C. Howe | 810 | 20.2 | N/A |
| Alliance | N. Reid | 791 | | |
| Conservative | A. Mullins | 788 | | |
| Alliance | M. Arcos | 762 | | |
| Turnout | | | 37.0 | +8.2 |
| Registered electors | | 10,848 | | |
| Labour hold | | Swing | | |
| Labour hold | | Swing | | |
| Labour hold | | Swing | | |

=== Fairwater (3 seats) ===
Fairwater
| Party | Candidate | Votes | % | ±% |
|---|---|---|---|---|
| Labour | Maxwell Phillips * | 2,224 | 40.1 | −6.8 |
| Labour | T. Ward * | 2,161 | | |
| Labour | D. Evans * | 2,086 | | |
| Alliance | M. Davies | 1,608 | 29.0 | N/A |
| Conservative | C. Ward | 1,522 | 27.4 | −5.7 |
| Conservative | K. Gillard | 1,433 | | |
| Conservative | D. Norman | 1,405 | | |
| Alliance | J. Duffield | 866 | | |
| Alliance | J. Sully | 802 | | |
| Plaid Cymru | P. Keelan | 199 | 3.6 | N/A |
| Turnout | | | 54.0 | +15.3 |
| Registered electors | | 10,274 | | |
| Labour hold | | Swing | | |
| Labour hold | | Swing | | |
| Labour hold | | Swing | | |

=== Gabalfa (1 seat) ===
Gabalfa
| Party | Candidate | Votes | % | ±% |
|---|---|---|---|---|
| Labour | C. David Hutchinson * | 1,296 | 51.7 | +11.7 |
| Conservative | R. Bevan | 574 | 22.9 | −4.2 |
| Alliance | V. Pearcey | 565 | 22.5 | −10.4 |
| Green | N. Thorne | 71 | 2.8 | N/A |
| Turnout | | | 52.7 | +3.7 |
| Registered electors | | 4,759 | | |
| Labour hold | | Swing | | |

=== Grangetown (3 seats) ===
Grangetown
| Party | Candidate | Votes | % | ±% |
|---|---|---|---|---|
| Labour | John Smith * | 2,213 | 47.4 | −5.5 |
| Labour | Joan Gallagher | 2,144 | | |
| Labour | Lynda Thorne | 2,110 | | |
| Conservative | J. O'Reilly * | 1,885 | 40.4 | −6.7 |
| Conservative | L. Quinn | 1,741 | | |
| Conservative | F. Arnold | 1,574 | | |
| Alliance | D. Lewis | 568 | 12.2 | N/A |
| Alliance | M. Jones | 541 | | |
| Alliance | P. Verma | 529 | | |
| Turnout | | | 50.7 | +5.0 |
| Registered electors | | 9,201 | | |
| Labour hold | | Swing | | |
| Labour hold | | Swing | | |
| Labour hold | | Swing | | |

=== Heath (3 seats) ===
Heath
| Party | Candidate | Votes | % | ±% |
|---|---|---|---|---|
| Conservative | R. Watkiss * | 2,757 | 53.0 | −4.4 |
| Conservative | C. Milsom * | 2,747 | | |
| Conservative | T. Merridew * | 2,655 | | |
| Alliance | P. Capron | 1,211 | 23.3 | +6.7 |
| Alliance | W. Monkley | 1,188 | | |
| Alliance | E. Fitzgerald-Kuhl | 1,103 | | |
| Labour | F. Hughes | 816 | 15.7 | +1.5 |
| Labour | P. Hambleton | 806 | | |
| Labour | E. Scheeres | 751 | | |
| Green | M. Evans | 421 | 8.1 | +1.1 |
| Turnout | | | 55.5 | +2.6 |
| Registered electors | | 9,736 | | |
| Conservative hold | | Swing | | |
| Conservative hold | | Swing | | |
| Conservative hold | | Swing | | |

=== Lisvane and St Mellons (1 seat) ===
Lisvane and St Mellons^{(b)}
| Party | Candidate | Votes | % | ±% |
|---|---|---|---|---|
| Conservative | J. Richards | 1,328 | 56.9 | −14.6 |
| Alliance | E. Richards | 807 | 34.6 | +18.5 |
| Labour | M. Walsh | 197 | 8.4 | −4.0 |
| Turnout | | | 49.0 | +15.1 |
| Registered electors | | 4,762 | | |
| Conservative hold | | Swing | | |

=== Llandaff (2 seats) ===
Llandaff
| Party | Candidate | Votes | % | ±% |
|---|---|---|---|---|
| Conservative | Julius Hermer * | 1,906 | 50.4 | −6.6 |
| Conservative | M. Jones * | 1,846 | | |
| Alliance | D. Marshall | 1,108 | 29.3 | +15.4 |
| Alliance | W. Slack | 1,037 | | |
| Labour | C. Bettinson | 836 | 13.3 | +2.1 |
| Labour | N. Couper | 775 | | |
| Plaid Cymru | G. Jones | 267 | 7.1 | −1.5 |
| Turnout | | | 56.0 | +8.4 |
| Registered electors | | 6,753 | | |
| Conservative hold | | Swing | | |
| Conservative hold | | Swing | | |

=== Llandaff North (2 seats) ===
Llandaff North
| Party | Candidate | Votes | % | ±% |
|---|---|---|---|---|
| Labour | M. Flynn * | 1,616 | 56.0 | +11.3 |
| Labour | E. Matthewson * | 1,484 | | |
| Conservative | J. Marshall | 679 | 23.5 | −1.1 |
| Conservative | K. Gunney | 678 | | |
| Alliance | E. Chamberlain | 468 | 16.2 | −12.6 |
| Alliance | G. Hallett | 435 | | |
| Green | R. Rendell | 123 | 4.3 | N/A |
| Turnout | | | 47.3 | −10.5 |
| Registered electors | | 6,103 | | |
| Labour hold | | Swing | | |
| Labour hold | | Swing | | |

=== Llanishen (3 seats) ===
Llanishen
| Party | Candidate | Votes | % | ±% |
|---|---|---|---|---|
| Conservative | P. Tatham | 2,308 | 40.0 | −5.3 |
| Conservative | A. Gretton | 2,272 | | |
| Conservative | A. Thomas * | 2,228 | | |
| Labour | C. Davies | 1,758 | 30.5 | −5.2 |
| Alliance | W. Matthews | 1,706 | 29.6 | +13.6 |
| Labour | B. Jones | 1,665 | | |
| Labour | W. Laing | 1,662 | | |
| Alliance | E. Warlow | 1,662 | | |
| Alliance | A. Capron | 1,661 | | |
| Turnout | | | 53.6 | +8.3 |
| Registered electors | | 10,762 | | |
| Conservative hold | | Swing | | |
| Conservative hold | | Swing | | |
| Conservative hold | | Swing | | |

=== Llanrumney (3 seats) ===
Llanrumney
| Party | Candidate | Votes | % | ±% |
|---|---|---|---|---|
| Labour | M. Llewellyn * | 2,184 | 51.3 | +6.5 |
| Labour | John Phillips * | 2,029 | | |
| Labour | John Reynolds * | 2,001 | | |
| Alliance | E. Morgan | 1,085 | 25.5 | −5.1 |
| Alliance | H. Coughlan | 1,062 | | |
| Alliance | S. Chamberlain | 1,046 | | |
| Conservative | S. Woods | 887 | 23.2 | −1.4 |
| Conservative | M. Glover | 877 | | |
| Conservative | A. McCarthy | 856 | | |
| Turnout | | | 45.8 | +0.1 |
| Registered electors | | 9,286 | | |
| Labour hold | | Swing | | |
| Labour hold | | Swing | | |
| Labour hold | | Swing | | |

=== Pentwyn (3 seats) ===
Pentwyn
| Party | Candidate | Votes | % | ±% |
|---|---|---|---|---|
| Alliance | T. Briley | 1,755 | 36.8 | +12.2 |
| Alliance | K. Holman | 1,717 | | |
| Alliance | P. Ribton | 1,686 | | |
| Conservative | M. Newman * | 1,474 | 30.9 | −11.1 |
| Conservative | R. Lewis * | 1,469 | | |
| Conservative | W. Pursey | 1,416 | | |
| Labour | S. Melia | 1,310 | 27.5 | +0.6 |
| Labour | G. Mawn | 1,284 | | |
| Labour | M. Peterson | 1,266 | | |
| Plaid Cymru | A. Morgan | 148 | 3.1 | −3.4 |
| Plaid Cymru | D. Balch | 108 | | |
| Plaid Cymru | R. Williams | 98 | | |
| Ind. Socialist | P. Jones | 81 | 1.7 | N/A |
| Turnout | | | 40.7 | +4.9 |
| Registered electors | | 11,725 | | |
| Alliance gain from Conservative | | Swing | | |
| Alliance gain from Conservative | | Swing | | |
| Alliance gain from Conservative | | Swing | | |

=== Plasnewydd (4 seats) ===
Plasnewydd^{(c)}
| Party | Candidate | Votes | % | ±% |
|---|---|---|---|---|
| Alliance | Georgette O. J. German * | 2,377 | 36.4 | +6.7 |
| Alliance | G. Harris | 1,904 | | |
| Labour | P. Armitage | 1,766 | 27.0 | +1.5 |
| Alliance | Freda Salway | 1,757 | | |
| Labour | E. Screen | 1,718 | | |
| Alliance | G. Wooley | 1,685 | | |
| Labour | P. Mitchell | 1,631 | | |
| Labour | D. Thornton | 1,591 | | |
| Conservative | Olwen Watkin * | 1,569 | 24.0 | −12.4 |
| Conservative | S. James * | 1,472 | | |
| Conservative | D. Evans | 1,374 | | |
| Conservative | T. Harris | 1,209 | | |
| Green | P. Taylor | 456 | 7.0 | +2.4 |
| Plaid Cymru | N. ap Glyn | 208 | 3.2 | +0.1 |
| Plaid Cymru | D. Bevan | 203 | | |
| Communist | R. Macmillan | 156 | 2.4 | +1.2 |
| Communist | R. Spencer | 125 | | |
| Turnout | | | 56.9 | +6.0 |
| Registered electors | | 12,063 | | |
| Alliance gain from Conservative | | Swing | | |
| Alliance gain from Conservative | | Swing | | |
| Labour gain from Conservative | | Swing | | |
| Alliance hold | | Swing | | |

=== Radyr & St Fagans (1 seat) ===
Radyr & St Fagans
| Party | Candidate | Votes | % | ±% |
|---|---|---|---|---|
| Conservative | L. Clarke * | 1,342 | 51.6 | −3.5 |
| Alliance | P. Robinson | 956 | 36.8 | +3.3 |
| Labour | R. Hughes | 303 | 11.6 | +0.2 |
| Turnout | | | 67.1 | +12.8 |
| Registered electors | | 3,877 | | |
| Conservative hold | | Swing | | |

=== Rhiwbina (3 seats) ===
Rhiwbina^{(d)}
| Party | Candidate | Votes | % | ±% |
|---|---|---|---|---|
| Conservative | Gareth Neale * | 2,955 | 50.6 | −7.6 |
| Conservative | K. Heselton | 2,846 | | |
| Conservative | Jeffrey Sainsbury * | 2,769 | | |
| Alliance | H. Haines | 1,624 | 27.8 | +4.1 |
| Alliance | J. Brent | 1,623 | | |
| Alliance | G. Power | 1,605 | | |
| Labour | S. Williams | 744 | 12.7 | −1.5 |
| Labour | D. Bethel | 729 | | |
| Labour | R. Hill | 688 | | |
| Green | G. Unwin | 522 | 8.9 | N/A |
| Turnout | | | 62.1 | +3.6 |
| Registered electors | | 9,418 | | |
| Conservative hold | | Swing | | |
| Conservative hold | | Swing | | |
| Conservative hold | | Swing | | |

=== Riverside (3 seats) ===
Riverside
| Party | Candidate | Votes | % | ±% |
|---|---|---|---|---|
| Labour | Jane Davidson | 2,274 | 47.6 | +4.2 |
| Labour | Sue Essex * | 2,144 | | |
| Labour | J. Wilson | 1,912 | | |
| Conservative | S. Clarke | 1,124 | 23.5 | −9.7 |
| Conservative | R. Griffiths | 1,119 | | |
| Conservative | A. Renwick | 1,093 | | |
| Alliance | E. Lawrie | 579 | 12.1 | −3.2 |
| Alliance | L. Keward | 562 | | |
| Alliance | J. Bayley | 549 | | |
| Green | S. Scanlon | 471 | 9.9 | +1.8 |
| Plaid Cymru | N. Hodges | 327 | 6.8 | N/A |
| Turnout | | | 50.7 | +9.0 |
| Registered electors | | 9,419 | | |
| Labour hold | | Swing | | |
| Labour hold | | Swing | | |
| Labour hold | | Swing | | |

=== Roath (3 seats) ===
Roath^{(e)}
| Party | Candidate | Votes | % | ±% |
|---|---|---|---|---|
| Alliance | C. Kelloway | 2,229 | 43.4 | +22.7 |
| Conservative | G. Brinks * | 2,176 | 42.4 | −17.8 |
| Conservative | D. Williams | 2,115 | | |
| Conservative | B. Hill | 2,099 | | |
| Alliance | S. Soffa | 2,015 | | |
| Alliance | V. Lane | 2,004 | | |
| Labour | D. Parsons | 728 | 15.2 | −0.9 |
| Labour | N. Butler | 714 | | |
| Labour | M. Harries | 678 | | |
| Turnout | | | 72.4 | +30.3 |
| Registered electors | | 9,872 | | |
| Alliance gain from Conservative | | Swing | | |
| Conservative hold | | Swing | | |
| Conservative hold | | Swing | | |

=== Rumney (2 seats) ===
Rumney
| Party | Candidate | Votes | % | ±% |
|---|---|---|---|---|
| Conservative | B. Joslyn * | 1,742 | 47.7 | −5.7 |
| Conservative | G. Lowder | 1,641 | | |
| Labour | D. Bevan | 1,489 | 40.8 | +5.0 |
| Labour | M. Payne | 1,346 | | |
| Alliance | D. Walker | 420 | 11.5 | +0.7 |
| Alliance | C. Al-Ubaidi | 361 | | |
| Turnout | | | 54.4 | +7.5 |
| Registered electors | | 6,710 | | |
| Conservative hold | | Swing | | |
| Conservative hold | | Swing | | |

=== Splott (2 seats) ===
Splott
| Party | Candidate | Votes | % | ±% |
|---|---|---|---|---|
| Labour | Geoffrey Mungham | 2,373 | 62.7 | +7.7 |
| Labour | D. Ormonde | 2,369 | | |
| Conservative | A. Fox | 842 | 22.2 | −2.0 |
| Conservative | G. Porter | 779 | | |
| Alliance | S. Ahmad | 289 | 7.6 | −0.2 |
| Alliance | C. Minor | 287 | | |
| Plaid Cymru | E. Jones | 282 | 7.4 | +4.4 |
| Turnout | | | 47.6 | +5.0 |
| Registered electors | | 7,957 | | |
| Labour hold | | Swing | | |
| Labour hold | | Swing | | |

=== Trowbridge (2 seats) ===
Trowbridge
| Party | Candidate | Votes | % | ±% |
|---|---|---|---|---|
| Labour | D. English * | 1,628 | 62.7 | −14.5 |
| Labour | Alun Michael * | 1,614 | | |
| Conservative | J. McCarthy | 603 | 23.2 | −0.6 |
| Conservative | W. Sellwood | 534 | | |
| Alliance | M. Morgan | 364 | 14.0 | N/A |
| Alliance | J. Cuff | 343 | | |
| Turnout | | | 30.8 | +13.3 |
| Registered electors | | 8,425 | | |
| Labour hold | | Swing | | |
| Labour hold | | Swing | | |

=== Whitchurch & Tongwynlais (4 seats) ===
Whitchurch & Tongwynlais
| Party | Candidate | Votes | % | ±% |
|---|---|---|---|---|
| Conservative | W. Griffiths * | 3,142 | 44.8 | −9.9 |
| Conservative | Brian Griffiths * | 2,929 | | |
| Conservative | Timothy Davies * | 2,911 | | |
| Conservative | Victor Riley * | 2,664 | | |
| Labour | D. Hutchinson | 2,040 | 29.1 | +6.3 |
| Labour | T. James | 2,034 | | |
| Labour | R. Morrisey | 1,866 | | |
| Alliance | T. Jenkins | 1,830 | 26.1 | +8.1 |
| Labour | A. Paskell | 1,819 | | |
| Alliance | M. Jones | 1,817 | | |
| Alliance | R. Haines | 1,728 | | |
| Alliance | R. Phillips | 1,650 | | |
| Turnout | | | 60.3 | +5.7 |
| Registered electors | | 11,623 | | |
| Conservative hold | | Swing | | |
| Conservative hold | | Swing | | |
| Conservative hold | | Swing | | |
| Conservative hold | | Swing | | |

(a) Elections Centre source also indicates whether candidate is female; compares the percentage vote of the lead candidate for each party in the ward
(b) South Wales Echo source also indicates 'retiring' ward councillors. It fails to include the Lisvane & St Mellons ward results.
(c) South Wales Echo lists Plasnewydd candidates G. Harris as Alliance and D. Evans as Conservative (which gives 4 candidates for each of these parties). Vote percentages shown reflect this.
(d) The Elections Centre source muddles the Conservative J. Sainsbury and Green Party's G. Unwin.
(e) The Elections Centre source wrongly identifies the Alliance candidate S. Soffa as a Liberal. Vote percentages shown correct this.

* pre-existing 'retiring' ward councillors at this election
