= 1983 Cardiff City Council election =

Local election in Cardiff, Wales

The 1983 Cardiff City Council election was held on Thursday 5 May 1983 to the district council known as Cardiff City Council, in Cardiff, South Glamorgan, Wales. It took place on the same day as other district council elections in Wales and England. The Conservative Party regained control of the council from the Labour Party.

The previous Cardiff City Council election took place in 1979 and the next full elections took place in 1987.

== Ward changes ==
This was the first election to be affected by the changes resulting from The City of Cardiff (Electoral Arrangements) Order 1982. Boundaries were redrawn and the number of electoral wards increased from 21 to 26, with a reduction in the numbers of councillors elected per ward. New wards of Butetown, Caerau, Cyncoed, Fairwater, Heath, Lisvane and St Mellons, Llandaff North, Llanrumney, Pentwyn, Radyr & St Fagans, Trowbridge and Whitchurch & Tongwynlais were introduced. The number of councillors reduced overall from 75 to 65.

== Overview ==
Labour had been in control of the council for the previous four years, but at the 1983 election the Conservatives regained control. With 34 councillors, they had an overall majority of three. Winning only three seats, the SDP-Liberal Alliance did not perform as well as they expected.

Labour blamed the ward boundary changes for the outcome. The former Labour council leader, Cllr John Reynolds, suggested it was a good performance, considering the number of council seats available had been reduced particularly in Labour voting areas. The Alliance failed to win seats in wards such as Gabalfa and blamed this on UK politics dominating the contest (with a possible general election on the horizon). The new Conservative council leader, Cllt Ron Watkiss, pledged to use the Tory majority to put some of the council's services out to private contractors.

The next designated next Lord Mayor, Olwen Watkin and her designated deputy, Stan James, came top of the poll in Plasnewydd. Alliance husband and wife team, Mike German and Georgette German, won seats in neighbouring wards. Eileen Roberts, recently widowed by the death of Conservative MP Michael Roberts, won a council seat in Rhiwbina.

Cardiff Council election result 1983
Party	Seats	Gains	Losses	Net gain/loss	Seats %	Votes %	Votes	+/−
Conservative	34	19	3	+16	52.3			
Labour	28	13	6	+7	43.0			
Alliance	3	3	0	+3	4.6			
Plaid Cymru	0	0	0	±0	0.0		4,037	
Ecology	0	0	0	±0	0.0		1,661	N/A
Communist	0	0	0	±0	0.0		214	

== Ward results ==
Contests took place in all twenty six wards.^{(a)}^{(b)}

=== Adamsdown (2 seats) ===
Adamsdown
Party	Candidate	Votes	%	±%
Labour	J. A. Phillips	1,063	61.8	N/A
Labour	William Herbert *	1,062		
Conservative	W. Lewis	400	23.3	N/A
Conservative	A. L. Kelly	391		
Alliance	A. Miles	178	10.3	N/A
Alliance	H. Minor	173		
Plaid Cymru	Sian A. Edwards	79	4.6	N/A
Plaid Cymru	Gwerfyl Arthur	47		
Turnout			30.6	N/A
Registered electors		5,626		
Labour hold		Swing		
Labour hold		Swing		

=== Butetown (1 seat) ===
Butetown
Party	Candidate	Votes	%	±%
Labour	Gaynor A. Legall	870	77.6	N/A
Conservative	L. J. Day	251	22.4	N/A
Turnout			46.2	N/A
Registered electors		2,427		
Labour win (new seat)				

=== Caerau (2 seats) ===
Caerau
Party	Candidate	Votes	%	±%
Labour	W. H. Carling ^{o}	1,462	54.6	N/A
Labour	David J. Seligman ^{o}	1,237		
Conservative	A. H. Hinder	658	24.6	N/A
Conservative	F. C. McAndrews	571		
Alliance	J. R. Blain	364	13.6	N/A
Ecology	G. P. Jones	195	7.3	N/A
Turnout			35.7	N/A
Registered electors		7,501		
Labour win (new seat)				
Labour win (new seat)				

=== Canton (3 seats) ===
Canton
Party	Candidate	Votes	%	±%
Conservative	Bella Brown*	2,530	50.8	N/A
Conservative	D. O. Davey	2,215		
Conservative	Trevor C. Tyrrell	2,170		
Labour	C. D. Eccles	1,637	32.9	N/A
Labour	Mark Drakeford	1,600		
Labour	J. Winslade	1,549		
Alliance	M. Lawson	599	12.0	N/A
Alliance	G. Shepherd	546		
Alliance	W. M. Smith	534		
Plaid Cymru	Keith Parry	212	4.3	N/A
Plaid Cymru	Peter J. Keelan	147		
Turnout			47.5	N/A
Registered electors		10,484		
Conservative hold		Swing		
Conservative gain from Labour		Swing		
Conservative gain from Labour		Swing		

=== Cathays (3 seats) ===
Cathays
Party	Candidate	Votes	%	±%
Alliance	Michael J. German	1,742	36.9	N/A
Alliance	Fred J. Hornblow	1,639		
Labour	Derek R. Allinson *	1,531	32.4	N/A
Alliance	D. W. T. Rees	1,524		
Labour	M. F. Harris	1,496		
Labour	W. C. Laing	1,335		
Conservative	F. Moorcraft	961	20.4	N/A
Conservative	S. Phillips	909		
Conservative	E. Robinson	861		
Plaid Cymru	Owen John Thomas	261	5.5	N/A
Ecology	K. J. Pearson	225	4.8	
Turnout			45.7	N/A
Registered electors		10,321		
Alliance gain from Labour		Swing		
Alliance gain from Labour		Swing		
Labour hold		Swing		

=== Cyncoed (3 seats) ===
Cyncoed
Party	Candidate	Votes	%	±%
Conservative	R. A. Hennessey ^{o}	2,977	62.1	N/A
Conservative	A. John ^{o}	2,957		
Conservative	Stefan Terlezki ^{o}	2,926		
Alliance	J. A. Bryant	1,335	27.8	N/A
Alliance	P. J. D. Bramall	1,308		
Alliance	G. S. Sagoo	1,556		
Labour	P. J. Williams	483	10.1	N/A
Labour	A. R. Lipman	468		
Labour	M. J. Parkinson	460		
Turnout			55.6	N/A
Registered electors		8,624		
Conservative win (new seat)				
Conservative win (new seat)				
Conservative win (new seat)				

=== Ely (3 seats) ===
Ely
Party	Candidate	Votes	%	±%
Labour	A. Buttle *	2,083	66.9	N/A
Labour	M. Buttle *	1,926		
Labour	Charlie Gale *	1,904		
Conservative	H. Derrick	1,031	33.1	N/A
Conservative	B. Sullivan	1,007		
Conservative	J. Bushrod	980		
Turnout			28.8	N/A
Registered electors		10,826		
Labour hold		Swing		
Labour hold		Swing		
Labour hold		Swing		

=== Fairwater (3 seats) ===
Fairwater
Party	Candidate	Votes	%	±%
Labour	T. J. Ward ^{o}	1,845	46.5	N/A
Labour	M. J. Phillips ^{o}	1,807		
Labour	D. M. Evans ^{o}	1,685		
Conservative	B. Hall	1,452	36.6	N/A
Conservative	M. A. Hallinan	1,324		
Conservative	F. B. Bowles	1,317		
Alliance	D. A. Griffin	669	16.9	N/A
Alliance	Jacqui Gasson	500		
Turnout			38.7	N/A
Registered electors		10,253		
Labour hold		Swing		
Labour hold		Swing		
Labour hold		Swing		

=== Gabalfa (1 seat) ===
Gabalfa
Party	Candidate	Votes	%	±%
Labour	C. Hutchinson	929	40.0	N/A
Alliance	H. J. O'Brien	766	32.9	N/A
Conservative	J. R. Turner	630	27.1	N/A
Turnout			49.0	N/A
Registered electors		4,749		
Labour hold		Swing		

=== Grangetown (3 seats) ===
Grangetown
Party	Candidate	Votes	%	±%
Labour	John Smith ^{o}	2,221	52.9	N/A
Labour	P. Bowen ^{o}	2,074		
Labour	C. Sheehan	2,032		
Conservative	J. P. O'Reilly *	1,978	47.1	N/A
Conservative	G. E. Judd *	1,894		
Conservative	B. F. Moorcraft *	1,795		
Turnout			45.7	N/A
Registered electors		9,182		
Labour gain from Conservative		Swing		
Labour gain from Conservative		Swing		
Labour gain from Conservative		Swing		

Smith and Bowen were previously councillors for the South ward.

=== Heath (3 seats) ===
Heath
Party	Candidate	Votes	%	±%
Conservative	C. D. Milsom ^{o}	2,840	57.4	N/A
Conservative	Ronald F. Watkiss ^{o}	2,830		
Conservative	T. D. Merridew	2,702		
Alliance	P. Eldon	822	16.6	N/A
Alliance	P. H. Williams	732		
Labour	R. S. Hughes	702	14.2	N/A
Alliance	E. Fitzgerald-Kuhl	685		
Labour	B. R. Jones	650		
Labour	E. Scheeres	629		
Ecology	M. J. Evans	344	7.0	N/A
Plaid Cymru	H. M. Jones	241	4.9	N/A
Plaid Cymru	E. A. Coyle	185		
Turnout		9,357	52.9	N/A
Registered electors		9,182		
Conservative win (new seat)				
Conservative win (new seat)				
Conservative win (new seat)				

Milsom and Watkiss were previously councillors in the Llanishen ward.

=== Lisvane and St Mellons (1 seat) ===
Lisvane and St Mellons
Party	Candidate	Votes	%	±%
Conservative	T. H. Davies ^{o}	1,152	71.5	N/A
Alliance	D. I. Harrison	260	16.1	N/A
Labour	M. G. Picardie	199	12.4	N/A
Turnout			33.9	N/A
Registered electors		4,752		
Conservative win (new seat)				

Davies was the sitting councillor in the preceding ward of Lisvane, Llanedeyrn & St Mellons.

=== Llandaff (2 seats) ===
Llandaff
Party	Candidate	Votes	%	±%
Conservative	M. E. Jones *	1,828	57.0	N/A
Conservative	Julius Hermer *	1,807		
Alliance	W. A. Slack	446	13.9	N/A
Labour	R. W. Rees	359	11.2	N/A
Labour	C. P. Byers	328		
Ecology	R. J. Rendell	299	9.3	N/A
Plaid Cymru	D. Cadog	275	8.6	N/A
Turnout			47.6	N/A
Registered electors		6,739		
Conservative hold		Swing		
Conservative hold		Swing		

=== Llandaff North (2 seats) ===
Llandaff North
Party	Candidate	Votes	%	±%
Labour	M. D. Flynn ^{o}	1,576	44.7	N/A
Labour	E. M. Matthewson ^{o}	1,433		
Alliance	M. J. Sheppard	1,014	28.8	N/A
Alliance	T. O. Jenkins	920		
Conservative	D. C.Porter	866	24.6	N/A
Conservative	M. E. W. Lindsay	824		
Plaid Cymru	T. O'Neill	67	1.9	N/A
Turnout			57.8	N/A
Registered electors		6,091		
Labour win (new seat)				
Labour win (new seat)				

=== Llanishen (3 seats) ===
Llanishen
Party	Candidate	Votes	%	±%
Conservative	L. O. Smith *	1,999	45.3	N/A
Conservative	A. J. Thomas *	1,904		
Conservative	C. M. Saunders	1,890		
Labour	T. James ^{o}	1,578	35.7	N/A
Labour	A. Hobbs-Staff	1,550		
Labour	A. K. Verma ^{o}	1,506		
Alliance	T. J. Fitzgerald-Khul	707	16.0	N/A
Alliance	J. D. Gough	705		
Alliance	S. M Adalja	599		
Plaid Cymru	A. Couch	130	2.9	N/A
Plaid Cymru	D. Balch	110		
Turnout			41.1	N/A
Registered electors		10,740		
Conservative hold		Swing		
Conservative hold		Swing		
Conservative hold		Swing		

Representation reduced from six seats to three at this election.

=== Llanrumney (3 seats) ===
Llanrumney
Party	Candidate	Votes	%	±%
Labour	M. B. Llewellyn ^{o}	1,901	44.8	N/A
Labour	John R. Phillips ^{o}	1,711		
Labour	John A. Reynolds ^{o}	1,646		
Alliance	Vita V. Jones	1,297	30.6	N/A
Conservative	E. R. McCarthy	1,041	24.6	N/A
Alliance	K. Tobin	1,028		
Conservative	S. Woods	1,028		
Alliance	E. Morgan	1,010		
Conservative	S. Brown	987		
Turnout			45.7	N/A
Registered electors		9,267		
Labour win (new seat)				
Labour win (new seat)				
Labour win (new seat)				

South Glamorgan councillor Vita Jones had recently defected from Labour to the SDP-Liberal Alliance.

=== Pentwyn (3 seats) ===
Pentwyn
Party	Candidate	Votes	%	±%
Conservative	R. Lewis ^{o}	1,763	42.1	N/A
Conservative	M. Newman ^{o}	1,746		
Conservative	W. J. Pursey	1,687		
Labour	S. J. Caesar	1,128	26.9	N/A
Labour	R. Longworth	1,116		
Labour	S. G. Lewis	1,041		
Alliance	M. McMahon	1,030	24.6	N/A
Alliance	M. Litchfield	1,024		
Alliance	F. A. J. Adams	985		
Plaid Cymru	A. Morgan	271	6.5	N/A
Turnout			35.8	N/A
Registered electors		11,701		
Conservative win (new seat)				
Conservative win (new seat)				
Conservative win (new seat)				

=== Plasnewydd (4 seats) ===
Plasnewydd
Party	Candidate	Votes	%	±%
Conservative	Olwen M. Watkin *	2,227	36.4	N/A
Conservative	S. A. James *	2,052		
Conservative	D. J. Evans *	1,969		
Alliance	Georgette O. J. German	1,819	29.7	N/A
Conservative	R. C. Oldridge	1,743		
Labour	G. E. Jenkins	1,532	25.5	N/A
Labour	M. Phelps	1,475		
Alliance	D. E. Hill	1,395		
Alliance	A. D. Powell	1,391		
Labour	J. Wilkinson	1,368		
Alliance	Jenny Randerson	1,346		
Labour	M. Walsh	1,346		
Ecology	P. Taylor	282	4.6	N/A
Plaid Cymru	G. M. Rees	191	3.1	N/A
Plaid Cymru	N. Hoyle	170		
Plaid Cymru	N. J. ap Glyn	162		
Plaid Cymru	C. H. Morgan	155		
Communist	R. Macmillan	74	1.2	N/A
Communist	R. Spencer	72		
Communist	J. Warhurst	68		
Turnout			50.9	N/A
Registered electors		12,039		
Conservative hold		Swing		
Conservative hold		Swing		
Conservative hold		Swing		
Alliance win (new seat)				

The number of seats available increased from three to four at this election.

=== Radyr & St Fagans (1 seat) ===
Radyr & St Fagans
Party	Candidate	Votes	%	±%
Conservative	L. Clarke ^{o}	1,156	55.1	N/A
Alliance	Marion Drake	703	33.5	N/A
Labour	B. Drew ^{o}	240	11.4	N/A
Turnout			54.3	N/A
Registered electors		3,869		
Conservative win (new seat)				

Clarke was the sitting councillor for Radyr St Fagans & Tongwynlais. Drew was a councillor in the Rumney ward.

=== Rhiwbina (3 seats) ===
Rhiwbina
Party	Candidate	Votes	%	±%
Conservative	E. J. Roberts	3,200	58.2	N/A
Conservative	Gareth J. J. Neale *	3,117		
Conservative	Jeffrey P. Sainsbury	3,099		
Alliance	S. R. Crossley	1,303	23.7	N/A
Alliance	G. M. James	1,037		
Alliance	P. M. O'Brien	1,032		
Labour	S. I. Walters	783	14.2	N/A
Labour	J. R. Cocks	753		
Labour	R. T. Hill	665		
Plaid Cymru	L. R. Evans	211	3.8	N/A
Plaid Cymru	J. A. M. Jones	153		
Turnout			58.5	N/A
Registered electors		9,399		
Conservative hold		Swing		
Conservative hold		Swing		
Conservative hold		Swing		

=== Riverside (3 seats) ===
Riverside
Party	Candidate	Votes	%	±%
Labour	W. M. Walker *	1,699	43.4	N/A
Labour	J. M. Southern *	1,660		
Labour	Sue Essex	1,653		
Conservative	A. Johnson	1,301	33.2	N/A
Conservative	M. Hughes	1,296		
Conservative	R. de Souza	1,272		
Alliance	D. Mathias	601	15.3	N/A
Alliance	J. N. Roberts	469		
Alliance	D. Sura	418		
Ecology	A. S. Lukes	316	8.1	N/A
Turnout			41.7	N/A
Registered electors		9,400		
Labour hold		Swing		
Labour hold		Swing		
Labour hold		Swing		

=== Roath (3 seats) ===
Roath
Party	Candidate	Votes	%	±%
Conservative	C. F. Hutchings *	2,498	60.2	N/A
Conservative	N. Lloyd-Edwards *	2,477		
Conservative	G. M. Brinks *	2,457		
Alliance	L. W. Kelloway	861	20.7	N/A
Alliance	S. J. Soffa	823		
Alliance	P. Callaghan	818		
Labour	I. S. Albrow	668	16.1	N/A
Labour	N. M. Davies	663		
Labour	E. A. Screen	625		
Plaid Cymru	G. Adams	123	3.0	N/A
Plaid Cymru	B. M. Smith	118		
Plaid Cymru	S. W. Evans	115		
Turnout			42.1	N/A
Registered electors		9,852		
Conservative hold		Swing		
Conservative hold		Swing		
Conservative hold		Swing		

=== Rumney (2 seats) ===
Rumney
Party	Candidate	Votes	%	±%
Conservative	J. B. Joslyn	1,677	53.4	N/A
Conservative	L. D. Quinn	1,508		
Labour	P. H. Owen *	1,126	35.8	N/A
Labour	M. Longden *	1,113		
Alliance	M. J. Morgan	340	10.8	N/A
Turnout			46.9	N/A
Registered electors		6,696		
Conservative gain from Labour		Swing		
Conservative gain from Labour		Swing		

=== Splott (2 seats) ===
Splott
Party	Candidate	Votes	%	±%
Labour	D. R. Ormonde *	1,860	55.0	N/A
Labour	E. Price *	1,759		
Conservative	F. Chichester	820	24.2	N/A
Conservative	R. D. James	751		
Alliance	P. M. Evans	603	7.8	N/A
Plaid Cymru	S. Lake	100	3.0	N/A
Turnout			42.6	N/A
Registered electors		7,941		
Labour hold		Swing		
Labour hold		Swing		

=== Trowbridge (2 seats) ===
Trowbridge
Party	Candidate	Votes	%	±%
Labour	D. M. English ^{o}	1,120	76.2	N/A
Labour	Alun E. Michael ^{o}	1,103		
Conservative	A. T. McCabe	350	23.8	N/A
Turnout			17.5	N/A
Registered electors		8,408		
Labour win (new seat)				
Labour win (new seat)				

English and Michael were previously councillors in a larger Rumney ward.

=== Whitchurch & Tongwynlais (4 seats) ===
Whitchurch & Tongwynlais
Party	Candidate	Votes	%	±%
Conservative	W. H. Griffiths ^{o}	3,460	54.7	N/A
Conservative	B. J. Griffiths	3,320		
Conservative	Timothy H. Davies ^{o}	3,294		
Conservative	Victor Riley ^{o}	3,221		
Labour	T. Crews	1,445	22.8	N/A
Labour	D. Hutchinson	1,383		
Labour	J. Williams	1,291		
Labour	V. White	1,265		
Alliance	P. Hickey	1,141	18.0	N/A
Alliance	H.Howell	999		
Alliance	A. Holder	993		
Alliance	S. Morton	933		
Plaid Cymru	Harri Pritchard-Jones	285	4.5	N/A
Plaid Cymru	Alan Jobbins	209		
Turnout			54.6	N/A
Registered electors		11,600		
Conservative win (new seat)				
Conservative win (new seat)				
Conservative win (new seat)				
Conservative win (new seat)				

(a) Elections Centre source also compares the percentage vote of the lead candidate for each party in the ward.
(b) South Wales Echo source also indicates existing councillors "but, because of boundary changes, not necessarily representing the ward being contested". It gives middle initials. It lists the 'green' candidates as "Ecology" and the 'Liberal/SDP' as "Alliance".

* existing councillor, for the same ward
^{o} existing councillor, though because of boundary changes not for the same ward
