= 1991 Cardiff City Council election =

Local election in Cardiff, Wales

- 2 May 1991

All 65 seats to Cardiff City Council 33 seats needed for a majority

	First party	Second party	Third party
Party	Labour	Conservative	Liberal Democrats
Seats won	39	16	9
Seat change	▲10	▼8	▼3
Popular vote	68,270
	Fourth party
Party	Independent
Seats won	1
Seat change	▲1
Popular vote	572
Council control before election
Labour
Council control after election
Labour

The 1991 Cardiff City Council election was held on Thursday 2 May 1991 to the district council of Cardiff in South Glamorgan, Wales. It took place on the same day as other district council elections in Wales and England. The Labour Party regained a majority on Cardiff City Council, after sharing government for the previous four years.

The previous Cardiff City Council election took place in 1987. The 1991 election was to be the final election to the district council before its dissolution and replacement, in 1995, by the new County Council of the City and County of Cardiff unitary authority.

== Overview ==
All 65 council seats were up for election, though the election in the safe Conservative ward of Heath was delayed, with the results coming later (though not affecting Labour's majority control). Since 1987 Labour had governed in coalition with the SDP–Liberal Alliance. Following the 1991 election it regained a majority on the council.

One of the major upsets of the election was the next Cardiff Lord Mayor-to-be, Gerald Brinks, losing his Roath seat. His designated successor, Anthea Thomas, also lost her seat in Llanishen. This meant Cllr Jeff Sainsbury unexpectedly became the new Lord Mayor, four years earlier than planned, as well as leader of the Conservative group on the council.

Labour made 11 gains and lost only one seat, to Independent Betty Campbell, in Butetown. The Conservatives lost 8 seats and the Liberal Democrats lost three.

Cardiff Council election result 1991
Party	Seats	Gains	Losses	Net gain/loss	Seats %	Votes %	Votes	+/−
Labour	39	11	1	▲10	60.0		68,270	
Conservative	16	0	8	▼8	24.6		29,467	
Liberal Democrats	9	2	5	▼3	13.8		22,287	
Independent	1	1	0	▲1	1.5		572	
Green	0	0	0	±0	0.0		4,910	
Plaid Cymru	0	0	0	±0	0.0		2,506	
SDP	0	0	0	±0	0.0		717	

== Ward results ==
Contests were held in all twenty-six wards:^{(a)}^{(b)}

=== Adamsdown (2 seats) ===
Adamsdown
Party	Candidate	Votes	%	±%
Labour	Jon Owen Jones*	1,209	65.9	+8.3
Labour	William Herbert*	1,194		
Liberal Democrats	Nigel Howells	256	14.0	−5.6
Conservative	A. C. S. Baker	220	12.0	−5.9
Liberal Democrats	S. Stevenson	210		
Conservative	B. Jeffreys	201		
Plaid Cymru	H. Davies	110	8.2	+3.3
Turnout			33.0	−3.8
Registered electors		5,649		
Labour hold		Swing		
Labour hold		Swing		

=== Butetown (1 seat) ===
Butetown
Party	Candidate	Votes	%	±%
Independent	Rachel E. Campbell	572	46.4	N/A
Labour	Ben J. Foday	532	43.1	−23.3
Conservative	K. D. Summerhayes	114	9.2	−16.3
Liberal Democrats	B. N. Singh	16	1.3	−6.8
Turnout			51.0	+7.7
Registered electors		2,437		
Independent gain from Labour		Swing		

=== Caerau (2 seats) ===
Caerau
Party	Candidate	Votes	%	±%
Liberal Democrats	Jacqui A. Gasson *	1,914	49.9	+17.3
Labour	Harry J. Ernest	1,546	40.3	−6.6
Labour	David J. Seligman *	1,444		
Liberal Democrats	Roger C. Burley	1,417		
Conservative	A. J. Pithers	258	6.7	−10.3
Green	R. S. Best	121	3.2	−0.2
Turnout			48.0	+1.8
Registered electors		7,532		
Liberal Democrats hold		Swing		
Labour hold		Swing		

=== Canton (3 seats) ===
Canton
Party	Candidate	Votes	%	±%
Labour	Kevin D. Brennan	2,485	50.8	+15.6
Labour	P. D. E. Mitchell	2,351		
Labour	David W. Thomas	2,153		
Conservative	D. O. Davey *	1,473	30.1	−9.3
Conservative	S. P. Docking	1,421		
Conservative	Trevor C. Tyrrell *	1,405		
Liberal Democrats	P. E. Crees	513	10.5	−4.0
Liberal Democrats	M. G. Kettle	464		
Green	Vivien M. C. Turner	416	8.5	+1.8
Liberal Democrats	C. Morris	386		
Turnout			44.0	−10.3
Registered electors		10,527		
Labour gain from Conservative		Swing		
Labour gain from Conservative		Swing		
Labour gain from Conservative		Swing		

=== Cathays (3 seats) ===
Cathays
Party	Candidate	Votes	%	±%
Liberal Democrats	Michael J. German *	2,231	41.7	+4.1
Liberal Democrats	Fred J. Hornblow *	2,115		
Labour	Derek R. Allinson *	1,903	35.6	−1.3
Liberal Democrats	D. W. T. Rees	1,742		
Labour	L. J. Glaister	1,672		
Labour	Reg Surridge	1,553		
Conservative	B. Rees	621	11.6	−4.8
Green	N. Clark	597	11.2	+5.3
Conservative	D. G. Embers	496		
Conservative	M. M. Williams	457		
Turnout			46.0	−5.2
Registered electors		10,363		
Liberal Democrats hold		Swing		
Liberal Democrats hold		Swing		
Labour hold		Swing		

=== Cyncoed (3 seats) ===
Cyncoed
Party	Candidate	Votes	%	±%
Liberal Democrats	Jenny E. Randerson	3,134	55.1	+4.4
Liberal Democrats	T. C. Pickets	2,956		
Liberal Democrats	N. J. Lewis	2,846		
Conservative	C. V. Baker	1,868	32.8	−10.7
Conservative	T. D. Donnelly	1,803		
Conservative	E. Loader	1,747		
Labour	S. N. Lashford	396	7.0	
Labour	C. Tugwell	393		
Labour	V. J. James	365		
Green	D. P. Corker	290	5.1	N/A
Turnout			62.0	−7.7
Registered electors		8,659		
Liberal Democrats hold		Swing		
Liberal Democrats hold		Swing		
Liberal Democrats hold		Swing		

=== Ely (3 seats) ===
Ely
Party	Candidate	Votes	%	±%
Labour	Elaine E. Morgan*	2,448	67.9	+8.9
Labour	T. A. Davies	2,194		
Labour	Charlie Gale *	2,144		
Conservative	K. B. Gillard	687	19.1	−1.9
Liberal Democrats	I. I. Sadler	471	13.1	−7.1
Liberal Democrats	M. Rawnsley	428		
Liberal Democrats	R. J. Hewlett	415		
Turnout			34.0	−3.0
Registered electors		10,870		
Labour hold		Swing		
Labour hold		Swing		
Labour hold		Swing		

=== Fairwater (3 seats) ===
Fairwater
Party	Candidate	Votes	%	±%
Labour	Maxwell J. Phillips *	2,501	52.3	+12.2
Labour	T. J. Ward *	2,497		
Labour	D. M. Evans *	2,227		
Conservative	D. M. Norman	1,046	21.9	−5.5
Conservative	W. R. P. Clarke	1,002		
SDP	R. G. Drake	717	15.0	N/A
Liberal Democrats	C. L. Ceaton	521	10.9	−18.1
Liberal Democrats	S. L. White	373		
Liberal Democrats	A. M. Wigley	329		
Turnout			41.0	+13.0
Registered electors		10,295		
Labour hold		Swing		
Labour hold		Swing		
Labour hold		Swing		

=== Gabalfa (1 seat) ===
Gabalfa
Party	Candidate	Votes	%	±%
Labour	C. D. Hutchinson *	1,362	63.1	+11.4
Conservative	E. R. Morgan	506	23.5	
Liberal Democrats	Cathy W. J. Pearcy	389	13.4	−9.1
Turnout			45.0	−7.7
Registered electors		4,769		
Labour hold		Swing		

=== Grangetown (3 seats) ===
Grangetown
Party	Candidate	Votes	%	±%
Labour	Joan M. Gallagher *	2,192	54.5	+7.1
Labour	John F. Smith *	2,129		
Labour	Lynda D. Thorne *	2,123		
Conservative	J. S. Summerhayes	917	22.8	−17.6
Conservative	F. M. Arnold	902		
Conservative	S. Trask	757		
Plaid Cymru	P. Fawkes	358	8.9	N/A
Liberal Democrats	J. Turnbull	341	8.5	−3.7
Green	K. S. Shaw	212	5.3	N/A
Liberal Democrats	M. K. Verma	153		
Liberal Democrats	A. Sayeda	152		
Turnout			40.0	−10.7
Registered electors		9,220		
Labour hold		Swing		
Labour hold		Swing		
Labour hold		Swing		

=== Heath (3 seats) ===
Heath
Party	Candidate	Votes	%	±%
Conservative	C. Milsom *	1,829	34.6	−18.4
Conservative	P. Donnelly	1,770		
Conservative	Greville Tatham *	1,643		
Independent	N. Rhodes	1,470	27.8	N/A
Liberal Democrats	W. Monkley	854	16.1	−7.2
Liberal Democrats	V. Hallett	810		
Liberal Democrats	J. James	805		
Labour	S. Walters	750	14.2	−1.5
Labour	L. Poole	650		
Labour	A. Culat	600		
Green	M. Evans	386	7.3	−0.8
Turnout			42.0	−13.5
Registered electors		9,395		
Conservative hold		Swing		
Conservative hold		Swing		
Conservative hold		Swing		

The contest in the Heath ward was suspended until after the main election, with the result declared at a later date.

=== Lisvane and St Mellons (1 seat) ===
Lisvane and St Mellons
Party	Candidate	Votes	%	±%
Conservative	J. W. Richards *	1,217	52.0	−4.9
Liberal Democrats	A. M. Holland	801	34.2	−0.4
Labour	L. H. V. Davis	265	11.3	+2.9
Green	M. L. Duddy	56	2.4	N/A
Turnout			49.0	−6.5
Registered electors		4,772		
Conservative hold		Swing		

=== Llandaff (2 seats) ===
Llandaff
Party	Candidate	Votes	%	±%
Conservative	Julius Hermer *	1,631	46.1	−4.3
Conservative	M. E. Jones *	1,605		
Labour	V. Seligman	836	23.6	+10.3
Labour	R. C. Watson	775		
Liberal Democrats	W. A. Slack	501	14.2	−15.1
Liberal Democrats	E. R. Williams	393		
Plaid Cymru	G. Jones	328	9.3	+2.2
Green	F. O. James	241	6.8	N/A
Turnout			49.0	−7.0
Registered electors		6,767		
Conservative hold		Swing		
Conservative hold		Swing		

=== Llandaff North (2 seats) ===
Llandaff North
Party	Candidate	Votes	%	±%
Labour	M. D. Flynn *	1,799	66.9	+10.9
Labour	M. E. Matthewson *	1,666		
Conservative	D. G. Morgan	548	20.4	−3.1
Conservative	J. B. Marshall	524		
Liberal Democrats	G. M. James	343	12.8	−3.4
Liberal Democrats	D. J. Wright	276		
Turnout			46.0	−1.3
Registered electors		6,116		
Labour hold		Swing		
Labour hold		Swing		

=== Llanishen (3 seats) ===
Llanishen
Party	Candidate	Votes	%	±%
Conservative	P. Tatham *	2,382	41.9	+1.9
Conservative	A. L. Gretton *	2,316		
Labour	Garry Hunt	2,308	40.6	+10.1
Labour	W. A. J. Matthews	2,252		
Labour	W. C. Laing	2,239		
Conservative	Anthea J. Thomas *	2,158		
Liberal Democrats	M. D. Cawley	989	17.4	−12.2
Liberal Democrats	V. M. Hallett	951		
Liberal Democrats	E. W. Richards	900		
Turnout			54.0	+0.4
Registered electors		10,784		
Conservative hold		Swing		
Conservative hold		Swing		
Labour gain from Conservative		Swing		

=== Llanrumney (3 seats) ===
Llanrumney
Party	Candidate	Votes	%	±%
Labour	Gill M. Bird *	2,575	69.4	+18.1
Labour	B. James *	2,386		
Labour	John R. Phillips *	2,159		
Conservative	A. M. McCarthy	743	20.0	−3.2
Conservative	R. J. Robinson	735		
Conservative	H. P. Hunt	694		
Green	L. Davey	392	10.6	N/A
Turnout			39.0	−6.8
Registered electors		9,305		
Labour hold		Swing		
Labour hold		Swing		
Labour hold		Swing		

=== Pentwyn (3 seats) ===
Pentwyn
Party	Candidate	Votes	%	±%
Labour	R. Longworth *	1,817	43.0	+15.5
Labour	P. K. Cubitt	1,702		
Labour	J. Sullivan	1,641		
Liberal Democrats	J. A. Walklett	1,292	30.6	−6.2
Liberal Democrats	M. C. McMahon	1,270		
Liberal Democrats	G. R. Williams	1,221		
Conservative	W. J. Pursey	813	19.2	−11.7
Conservative	E. T. Richardson	777		
Conservative	V. A. West	717		
Green	G. J. John	305	7.2	N/A
Turnout			35.0	−5.7
Registered electors		11,749		
Labour hold		Swing		
Labour gain from Liberal Democrats		Swing		
Labour gain from Liberal Democrats		Swing		

=== Plasnewydd (4 seats) ===
Plasnewydd
Party	Candidate	Votes	%	±%
Labour	A. C. Cox	2,401	37.4	+10.4
Labour	P. W. Morris	2,203		
Labour	F. M. Jackson	2,153		
Labour	J. Wilkinson	2,083		
Liberal Democrats	Georgette O. J. German *	1,782	27.8	−8.6
Liberal Democrats	S. E. Jennett	1,459		
Liberal Democrats	J. C. Bennett	1,379		
Liberal Democrats	P. K. Verma	1,226		
Conservative	S. V. Cox	1,048	16.3	−7.7
Conservative	K. Fisher	933		
Conservative	D. C. Porter	876		
Conservative	D. C. Williams	809		
Green	C. J. von Ruhland	675	10.5	+3.5
Plaid Cymru	S. Edwards	511	8.0	
Turnout			43.0	−13.9
Registered electors		12,088		
Labour hold		Swing		
Labour gain from Liberal Democrats		Swing		
Labour gain from Liberal Democrats		Swing		
Labour gain from Liberal Democrats		Swing		

=== Radyr & St Fagans (1 seat) ===
Radyr & St Fagans
Party	Candidate	Votes	%	±%
Conservative	P. Davison-Sebry	1,035	48.4	−3.2
Labour	P. Robinson	600	28.1	+16.5
Liberal Democrats	N. L. Roberts	502	23.5	−11.3
Turnout			55.0	−12.1
Registered electors		3,885		
Conservative hold		Swing		

=== Rhiwbina (3 seats) ===
Rhiwbina
Party	Candidate	Votes	%	±%
Conservative	Gareth J. J. Neale *	2,642	50.5	−0.1
Conservative	Jeffrey P. Sainsbury *	2,605		
Conservative	K. B. C. Heselton *	2,483		
Labour	L. L. Jenkins	1,183	22.6	+9.9
Labour	J. B. Minkes	1,093		
Labour	A. P. Kempton	987		
Liberal Democrats	J. G. Brent	976	18.7	−9.1
Liberal Democrats	G. Hallet	927		
Liberal Democrats	K. Bowden	832		
Green	G. P. Jones	427	8.2	−0.7
Turnout			52.0	−10.1
Registered electors		9,437		
Conservative hold		Swing		
Conservative hold		Swing		
Conservative hold		Swing		

=== Riverside (3 seats) ===
Riverside
Party	Candidate	Votes	%	±%
Labour	R. I. O. Brown *	2,340	54.8	+7.2
Labour	Jane E. Davidson *	2,295		
Labour	Sue L. Essex *	2,271		
Conservative	N. A. Rhodes	776	18.2	−5.3
Conservative	G. Crosby	736		
Conservative	P. C. Young	720		
Green	P. G. Ward	406	9.5	−0.4
Plaid Cymru	C. ap Henri	382	8.9	+2.1
Liberal Democrats	R. Addison	367	8.6	−3.5
Liberal Democrats	A. M. Burgess	303		
Liberal Democrats	R. P. Fawcett	247		
Turnout			41.0	−9.7
Registered electors		9,438		
Labour hold		Swing		
Labour hold		Swing		
Labour hold		Swing		

=== Roath (3 seats) ===
Roath
Party	Candidate	Votes	%	±%
Liberal Democrats	C. J. Kelloway *	2,717	49.1	+5.7
Liberal Democrats	M. N. Michaelis	2,458		
Liberal Democrats	Freda J. Salway	2,344		
Conservative	G. M. Brinks *	1,615	29.2	−13.2
Conservative	D. G. Williams *	1,415		
Conservative	D. C. Harris	1,398		
Labour	Ralph Rees	818	14.8	−0.4
Labour	D. Groves	789		
Labour	A. Stuart	629		
Green	D. Beasley	386	7.0	N/A
Turnout			51.0	−21.4
Registered electors		9,892		
Liberal Democrats hold		Swing		
Liberal Democrats gain from Conservative		Swing		
Liberal Democrats gain from Conservative		Swing		

=== Rumney (2 seats) ===
Rumney
Party	Candidate	Votes	%	±%
Labour	A. A. Huish	1,820	59.7	+18.9
Labour	C. Holland	1,649		
Conservative	A. L. Hollands	1,216	40.3	−7.4
Conservative	L. T. Sharp	1,079		
Turnout			46.0	−8.4
Registered electors		6,724		
Labour gain from Conservative		Swing		
Labour gain from Conservative		Swing		

=== Splott (2 seats) ===
Splott
Party	Candidate	Votes	%	±%
Labour	Geoffrey Mungham *	2,894	75.9	+13.2
Labour	Ricky Ormonde *	2,572		
Conservative	G. D. Donaldson	585	16.5	−5.7
Conservative	C. S. Ayland	546		
Liberal Democrats	J. V. Febbo	271	7.6	±0.0
Liberal Democrats	R. K. Bhagat	193		
Turnout			46.0	−1.6
Registered electors		7,974		
Labour hold		Swing		
Labour hold		Swing		

=== Trowbridge (2 seats) ===
Trowbridge
Party	Candidate	Votes	%	±%
Labour	D. M. English *	1,689	61.7	−1.0
Labour	R. S. Hughes *	1,658		
Conservative	A. L. Cashin	644	23.5	+0.3
Conservative	K. Thomas	625		
Liberal Democrats	W. J. Ford	274	10.0	−4.0
Liberal Democrats	H. K. Deogan	263		
Plaid Cymru	S. R. Parry	129	4.7	N/A
Turnout			33.0	−2.2
Registered electors		8,442		
Labour hold		Swing		
Labour hold		Swing		

=== Whitchurch & Tongwynlais (4 seats) ===
Whitchurch & Tongwynlais
Party	Candidate	Votes	%	±%
Conservative	W. H. Griffiths *	3,033	42.5	−2.3
Conservative	T. H. Davies *	2,817		
Conservative	Brian John Griffiths *	2,798		
Conservative	Victor Riley*	2,652		
Labour	D. R. Bethel	2,629	36.8	+7.7
Labour	T. H. Crews	2,561		
Labour	P. H. Owen	2,376		
Labour	M. R. Winters	2,176		
Liberal Democrats	G. A. Mellem	832	11.6	−14.5
Liberal Democrats	H. G. Howell	812		
Liberal Democrats	F. Leevers	810		
Liberal Democrats	T. J. G. Williams	658		
Plaid Cymru	Harri Pritchard-Jones	648	9.1	N/A
Turnout			56.0	−4.3
Registered electors		11,647		
Conservative hold		Swing		
Conservative hold		Swing		
Conservative hold		Swing		
Conservative hold		Swing		

(a) Elections Centre source also indicates pre-existing 'retiring' ward councillors, whether candidate is female, compares the percentage vote of the lead candidate for each party in the ward

(b) South Wales Echo source also indicates pre-existing 'retiring' ward councillors, candidates' full initials, whether the result was 'no change' or a 'gain'

* pre-existing 'retiring' ward councillors at this election

== See also ==
- 1987 Cardiff City Council election
- 1995 Cardiff Council election
