= Pentwyn (electoral ward) =

Electoral area in Wales

Pentwyn ward
- Electoral ward
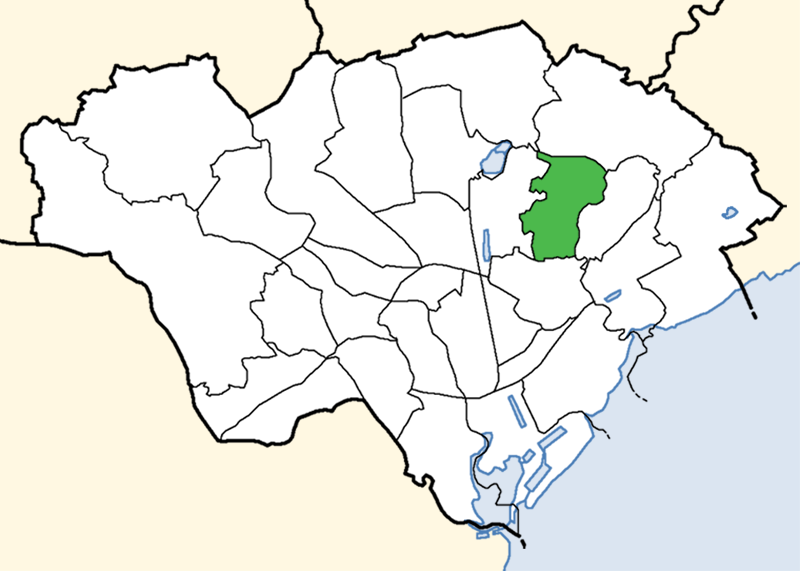
- Location of Pentwyn ward within Cardiff
- Population: 15,634 (2011 census)
- Community: Pentwyn/Llanedeyrn
- Principal area: Cardiff
- Country: Wales
- Sovereign state: United Kingdom
- Post town: CARDIFF
- Postcode district: CF23
- Dialling code: +44-29
- UK Parliament: Cardiff East
- Senedd Cymru – Welsh Parliament: Cardiff Central
- Councillors: 4

Pentwyn is an electoral ward in the northeast of Cardiff, capital city of Wales. It covers the communities of Pentwyn and Llanedeyrn (which was created from the southern part of Pentwyn in 2016). The ward has elected councillors to the post-1996 Cardiff Council and the pre-1996 Cardiff City Council.

== Description ==
The Pentwyn ward is bordered to the north by the Pontprennau & Old St Mellons, to the west by Cyncoed and to the south by the Penylan ward. To the east the border is defined by the River Rhymney.

The Pentwyn ward elected three councillors to Cardiff Council in 1995 and has elected four councillors since 1999. It has been represented by the Labour Party and the Liberal Democrats, with the Liberal Democrats dominating the ward since 2004. Councillor Judith Woodman, who won her Pentwyn seat at a 2003 by-election and had been deputy leader of the council and leader of the Liberal Democrat group, stood down at the May 2017 election.

Between 1983 and 1996 Pentwyn was a ward to Cardiff City Council.

== Elections and councillors ==
Representation 1995 – date
Election	Labour	Lib Dem
2022	1	2
2017	1	3
2012	-	4
2008	-	4
2004	-	4
1999	3	1
1995	3	-

=== May 2017 ===
2017 Cardiff Council election
Party	Candidate	Votes	%	±%
Liberal Democrats	Joseph William CARTER *	1,822	12%	
Liberal Democrats	Emma-Jayne SANDREY	1,627	11%	
Liberal Democrats	Daniel Joshua NAUGHTON	1,578	11%	
Labour	Frank Lewis JACOBSEN	1,411	9%	
Labour	Michael FOGG	1,409	9%	
Liberal Democrats	Jonathan Arthur SHIMMIN	1,346	9%	
Labour	Samsunear ALI	1,325	9%	
Labour	Margaret Casilda THOMAS	1,199	8%	
Conservative	Kathleen FISHER	663	4%	
Conservative	Munawar Ahmed MUGHAL	623	4%	
Conservative	Nathan Anthony Isaac WATSON	559	4%	
Conservative	Jack Miall SELLERS	530	4%	
Plaid Cymru	Andrew Paul MORGAN	236	2%	
Plaid Cymru	Pauline Mary MORGAN	228	2%	
Plaid Cymru	Martin John POLLARD	202	2%	
Plaid Cymru	Huw Gwilym HUGHES	172	2%	
TUSC	Stephen Malcolm WILLIAMS	98	1%	
Turnout			38%	

* = sitting councillor prior to the election

=== 2003 by-election ===
A by-election was triggered in 2003 following the resignation of Liberal Democrat councillor, Bill Cookson, whose job had taken him away from Cardiff. The by-election took place on 11 September and was seen as a 'dry-run' for the council-wide elections due to take place the following year. Labour council leader Russell Goodway was increasingly unpopular and his administration was facing a challenge from the Liberal Democrats. The Labour candidate in the by-election, Luke Holland, had resigned his job to stand in the election and described himself as "the Labour Party candidate, not the Russell Goodway candidate". The Labour Party also faced a challenge from the left, with the Welsh Socialist Alliance fielding the secretary of the South Wales Fire Brigades Union as a candidate.

The resulting "disastrous showing" for Labour and the "landslide" victory for the Liberal Democrats led to a local vote of 'no confidence' in Cllr Goodway, with a further vote of no confidence discussed by the county Labour Party in October.

=== Cardiff City Council ===
Between 1983 and 1996 Pentwyn elected three councillors to Cardiff City Council. In 1983 the ward elected three Conservative Party councillors, in 1987 the ward elected three Liberal Alliance representatives and, in 1991, all three councillors were from the Labour Party.
