= Sue Essex =

British politician (born 1945)

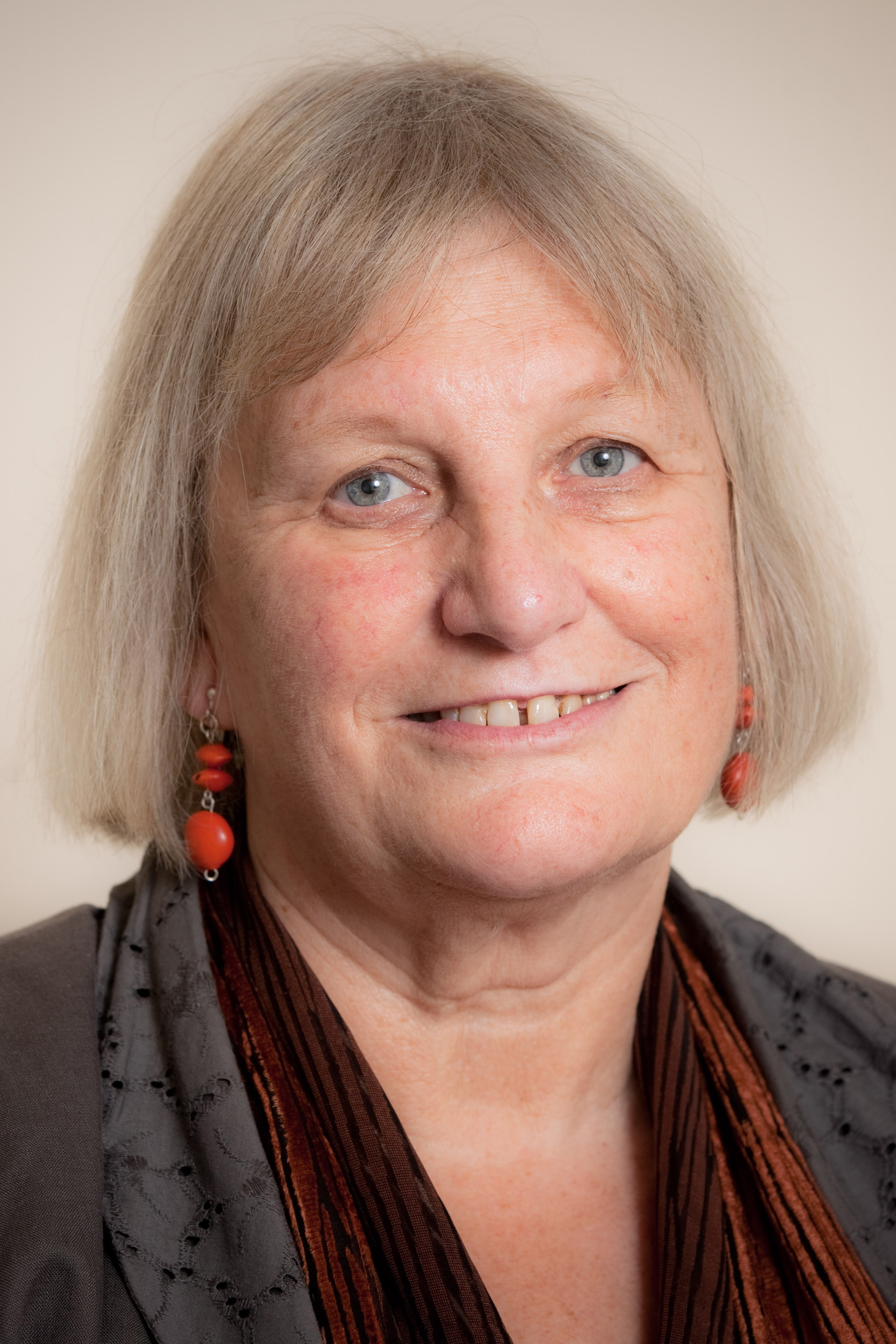
- Official portrait, c. 2011

Minister for Finance, Local Government and Public Services
- In office 8 May 2003 – 3 May 2007
- First Minister: Rhodri Morgan
- Preceded by: Edwina Hart (Note: As Minister for Finance, Local Government and Communities.)
- Succeeded by: Andrew Davies (Note: As Minister for Finance and Public Service Delivery.)

Minister for the Environment (Note: This office was named Assembly Secretary for the Environment from February to October 2000.)
- In office 22 February 2000 – 8 May 2003
- First Minister: Rhodri Morgan (Note: As First Secretary of Wales from February to October 2000.)
- Preceded by: Office established
- Succeeded by: Carwyn Jones (Note: As Minister for Environment, Planning and Countryside.)

Assembly Member for Cardiff North
- In office 6 May 1999 – 3 May 2007
- Preceded by: Assembly established
- Succeeded by: Jonathan Morgan
- Majority: 540 (1.95%)

Leader of Cardiff City Council
- In office 19 May 1994 – 1 April 1996
- Preceded by: John Phillips
- Succeeded by: Council abolished (Note: Russell Goodway as Leader of Cardiff County Council.)
Other political offices 1983‍–‍1998
Member of Cardiff County Council for Riverside
In office 4 May 1995 – 6 May 1999 Serving with R. Brown and J. Singh
Preceded by	Council established
Succeeded by	P. Mitchell (Note: With D. Sharpe and Neil McEvoy.)
Deputy Leader of Cardiff City Council
In office c. July 1991 – 19 May 1994
Leader	John Phillips
Succeeded by	Paul Morris
Chair of the Planning Committee of Cardiff City Council
In office 11 May 1987 – 19 May 1994
Member of Cardiff City Council for Riverside
In office 5 May 1983 – 1 April 1996 Serving with R. Brown and Jane Davidson (Note: J. Southern and W. Walker (1983–1987); Jane Davidson and J. Wilson (1987–1991).)
Preceded by	A. Verma (Note: With J. McCarthy and W. Walker.)
Succeeded by	Council abolished

Personal details
- Born: Susan Linda Lines; 29 August 1945 (age 81) Derbyshire, England
- Party: Labour
- Spouse: Richard Essex (m. 1967)
- Children: 2
- Education: University of Leicester (BA Hons)

Susan Linda Essex (née Lines; born 29 August 1945) is a British politician who served in the Welsh Assembly Government as Minister for the Environment from 2000 to 2003 and Minister for Finance, Local Government and Public Services from 2003 to 2007. A member of the Labour Party, she was Leader of Cardiff City Council from 1994 until its abolition in 1996 and Assembly Member (AM) for Cardiff North from 1999 until her retirement in 2007.

Brought up in Tottenham, she moved to South Wales in 1971.

== Early life and career ==
Susan Linda Essex (née Lines) was born on 29 August 1945 in Derbyshire, England. (Note: The England & Wales, Civil Registration Birth Index lists Essex's birthplace as Bakewell, Derbyshire, England. A profile from BBC News lists her birthplace as Cromford, Derbyshire while a fact file from the South Wales Echo states that she was born in Wirksworth, Derbyshire.) She was raised in Tottenham, North London, in what she later described as "[what] would be seen as quite poor circumstances – poor financially, not poor spiritually [...] we lived in a two-room terraced house with the toilet at the end of the garden and no running water." She studied at the University of Leicester, where she graduated with BA Hons in geography. At university, she was active in the Anti-Apartheid Movement and joined the Labour Party. She also met fellow student Richard Essex, who she later married on 9 September 1967. They have two children, including a son and a daughter.

Essex and her husband Richard lived in Chelmsford, Essex, until her husband's work (Note: In Wales, Richard Essex worked for the Welsh Development Agency.) led them to move in 1971 to Cardiff, Wales. Prior to her career in politics, Essex worked as a technical secretary at the South Wales Standing Conference from 1971 to 1973. She developed an interest in city planning from her dislike of the tower block developments which were being built across the United Kingdom at that time, as well as the perceived lack of choice people had in changes to their local environment. After training to become a planner, she started a career in planning and local government. In 1978, she became one of the founding members of Planning Aid Wales. She worked as a planner for Mid Glamorgan County Council from 1987 to 1991, Wattham Forest London Borough Council from 1996 to 1997 and Essex County Council from 1997 to 1999. In 1991, she became a lecturer in planning at the University of Wales, Cardiff, before leaving this role after her election to the National Assembly for Wales in 1999. Outside of her career in planning and local government, Essex also worked as a researcher for the Equal Opportunity Commission from 1985 to 1987. At some point before her election to the assembly, she was also a member of the Countryside Council for Wales.

== Early political career ==
=== Cardiff City Council ===
Essex began her political career when she was elected to represent the ward of Riverside in the 1983 Cardiff City Council election, serving alongside Labour colleagues J. Southern and W. Walker. She was re-elected in the 1987 council election, serving alongside Labour colleagues J. Wilson and Jane Davidson, and in the 1991 council election, serving alongside Davidson and R. Brown, also of the Labour Party. As a councillor, Essex was part of a local group of allied soft left Labour politicians known as the "Riverside Mafia", which also included Davidson, South Glamorgan County Council members Mark Drakeford, Jane Hutt and Julie Morgan, and Cardiff West MP Rhodri Morgan. It was known for opposing the policies of Jack Brooks and Russell Goodway, the Labour leaders of South Glamorgan in the 1980s and 1990s, and the Cardiff Bay Barrage project which they supported. Most members of this group, including Essex, later served in Morgan's cabinet during his tenure as First Minister of Wales in the 2000s.

Following the council election in May 1987, Essex was appointed chair of the council's planning committee by the council's newly formed Labour minority administration led by John Reynolds. After Reynolds's death in April 1990 and the election of John Phillips to succeed him as leader of the Labour group and the council in May, Essex was nominated for the deputy leadership of the Labour group and the council by group members. She withdrew her bid for the deputy leadership because of a rule which barred committee chairs from becoming deputy leader of the council; Essex did not want to resign as chair of the planning committee for the deputy leadership and preferred to remain in her previous post rather than continue her bid. By July 1991, she had managed to become deputy leader of the council while remaining chair of the planning committee.

In May 1992, Essex challenged Phillips for the leadership of the Labour group and the council. In the internal party election which followed, Essex and Phillips tied with 19 votes each. Three ballots were held, each returning the same result. Councillor Mike Flynn, a known supporter of Phillips, could not attend the vote because of an illness. Another vote was held later that month, this time with Flynn in attendance. On this occasion, Phillips was re-elected as leader with a reported majority of one vote. In the same session as the leadership vote, Essex was re-elected as deputy leader and chair of the planning committee. Essex made another bid for the leadership two years later in May 1994 and succeeded in what became a left-wing takeover of the council and the Labour group from the previous, more traditionalist leadership. Essex took over the council on a reported majority of three votes. Her election made her the first woman to serve as the council's leader. A left-wing deputy mayor, Paul Morris, was elected by the Labour group to serve under Essex.

As leader of the council, Essex pursued a more interventionist form of city governance. To this end, she set up the City Centre Partnership Forum (CCPF) which was made up of stakeholders from the private and public sectors. The forum developed a prospectus in 1995 to take advantage of private investment and enable further investment and change to the city. The improvement of public spaces was a priority for the forum, with its first project being to construct a new courtyard for pedestrians at Cardiff Central railway station, which underwent refurbishments; the project saw limited success. A tourism plan for the city was published in 1995. It called for a more interventionist and ambitious policy toward the promotion of tourism and recommended the creation of a tourism service, tourism forum and partnerships between the city and parts of the tourism industry. Essex was also instrumental in pushing a green agenda in the city.

=== Cardiff County Council ===
In 1991, the Conservative government announced plans to reorganise local government in Wales by replacing its two-tier system of local authorities with a one-tier system of unitary authorities. Under the plans, Cardiff City Council and South Glamorgan County Council would merge to form the new Cardiff County Council from 1996. Both Essex and South Glamorgan's Labour leader Russell Goodway stated their intention to lead the new council. As leader of the city council, Essex started out as the favourite to take over the county council. Because of the reduced number of councillors who would sit in the unitary authority, both leaders intervened in Labour's candidate selection processes for the first county council election in May 1995 to improve their chances in the internal leadership election by maximising the number of their supporters who could stand for election. By May 1995, Goodway had become the favourite, although Essex was still seen as having a viable chance of beating Goodway for the leadership.

At the 1995 county council election, Labour secured a landslide victory over the Conservative Party. Essex was elected to represent Riverside in the new council alongside Labour colleagues R. Brown and J. Singh. Goodway was also elected to the new council in the ward of Ely. In the aftermath of the election, the 56 members of the new council's Labour group split into two factions, one supportive of Essex and one supportive of Goodway. Shortly after the election, a leadership election in the Labour group was held to decide which of the two leaders would become the group's leader and therefore the leader of the county council. Goodway won the election on a majority of four votes and became the leader of the council; Essex also stood for the deputy leadership of the Labour group and the council but lost to Gordon Houlston, Goodway's deputy in South Glamorgan. Goodway's election put Cardiff under the control of Labour's internal political right. Essex's more politically progressive base fell out of favour in the local Labour group, with her supporters being treated as internal opponents of the party. The green agenda adopted during Essex's leadership of the city council was also dropped by the leadership of the county council in favour of a more traditional focus on economic regeneration.

In June 1995, Essex's supporters accused the May leadership election of being against the Labour Party's rules, as the agenda for the meeting of the Labour group on the day of the vote neglected to mention a leadership vote; several councillors claimed that they did not know about the vote until it was held and were therefore unable to nominate candidates beforehand. Following an investigation by the national party, another election was held in February 1996. Goodway secured another victory over Essex, this time with an increased majority of 17 votes. Essex also stood for the deputy leadership and the chairmanship of the council's planning committee, losing to Houlston and Neil Salmon respectively. She challenged Goodway for the leadership a third time in April 1998, with Goodway being re-elected as leader with around two-thirds of the vote. In July, she announced that she would step down from the council at the 1999 council election.

== National Assembly for Wales ==
In 1995, Essex became a member of the Welsh Labour pressure group Welsh Labour Action, which campaigned for the devolution of powers, including tax powers, from the UK Parliament to a devolved Welsh assembly elected with a gender balance through proportional representation. In an interview with the Western Mail from 2007, she said she started supporting devolution during the period of Conservative governance from 1979 to 1997, which "made me think that if we were going to have a Tory Government, at least we could do things differently in Wales". In July 1998, she announced her plan to stand for the Labour Party as a candidate in the 1999 National Assembly for Wales election, the first election to the devolved legislature after a public referendum enabled its creation in 1997. In November 1998, she was selected as the party's candidate for the assembly constituency of Cardiff North. She was also placed on Labour's top-up list for the electoral region of South Wales Central.

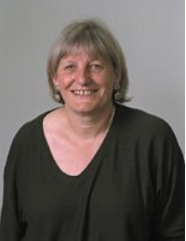
Essex's official portrait in the National Assembly for Wales, c. 2000

At the assembly election in May 1999, Essex won Cardiff North for the Labour Party with 12,198 votes, a majority of 2,304 over the Conservative candidate Jonathan Morgan. She was re-elected in the 2003 assembly election with 10,413 votes, a majority of 540 over Morgan. In the assembly, Essex started out as a backbencher. She was described by BBC News shortly after her election in 1999 as one of the "most experienced" backbenchers in the Labour group led by Alun Michael, the first secretary of Wales. The Labour group in the assembly organised itself into three factions, a faction loyal to Michael who were cautious of granting the assembly more devolved powers, a faction of devolutionists who wanted more autonomy and powers granted to the assembly, and a third non-aligned faction which later became loyal to the devolutionist first secretary Rhodri Morgan after Michael's resignation in 2000; Essex aligned herself with the second faction.

In her first year at the assembly, Essex was Chair of the Assembly Local Government and Environment Committee, where she worked with Peter Law, the assembly secretary for local government and housing. The committee first met in June 1999 before being dissolved in March 2000 as it no longer matched the responsibilities of any members of the Welsh cabinet, which had been reshuffled earlier that year. Essex was also a member of the all-party housing group.

=== Minister for the Environment ===
In February 2000, First Secretary Rhodri Morgan appointed Essex to his cabinet as Assembly Secretary for the Environment, with responsibility for transport, planning and the environment. A close ally of Morgan's, Essex had publicly supported him in both of his bids for the Welsh Labour leadership in 1998 and 1999. Her appointment meant that the cabinet now had five women out of nine members, making the Welsh cabinet the first executive of any country in the West to have a majority of women; Morgan said her appointment had been decided on merit rather than gender. After the formation of Morgan's coalition government with the Liberal Democrats in October 2000, Essex's ministerial role was renamed Minister for the Environment, (Note: On the formation of the coalition, Morgan's government announced that it would no longer use the term "assembly secretary" to refer to members of the cabinet, with the term "minister" now used instead to differentiate cabinet members from members of the Civil Service.) with her portfolio now also including sustainable development.

In April 2000, Essex pledged to introduce free bus passes for pensioners and people with disabilities in Wales. Following a public consultation, Essex went ahead with the plan and announced in September that the changes would come into force from April 2001 through provisions made in the UK Parliament's Transport Act, which was passed later the same year. Under the policy, people resident in Wales who were women aged 60 or above, men aged 65 or above, or registered as disabled would be eligible for free bus passes, which under the provisions of the act would give them a statutory minimum discount of 50% for bus fares in Wales. In February 2001, UK deputy prime minister John Prescott announced that the UK Government would fund lowering the age of eligibility for men to 60 to bring it in line with the age of eligibility for women, a change Essex supported. Essex also made a further commitment to scrap local bus fare charges in their entirety for pensioners and disabled people living in Wales from April 2002, including women aged 60 or over and men aged 65 or over, making local bus travel free for these demographics. This change came into force as scheduled in April 2002 at a cost of £17.7 million for the National Assembly. Further funding was earmarked to extend the policy to men aged 60 or above from the 2003–2004 financial year.

Essex became the Minister for Finance, Local Government and Public Services following the 2003 election.

She announced on 19 August 2005 that she would stand down at the 2007 National Assembly for Wales election. Although supporting Labour candidate Sophie Howe, she was succeeded by Conservative Jonathan Morgan.

== Notes and references ==
Notes

== Offices held ==
Senedd
Preceded by (new post)	Assembly Member for Cardiff North; 1999–2007	Succeeded by Jonathan Morgan
Political offices
Preceded by (new post)	Minister for Environment, Transport and Planning; 2000 – 2003	Succeeded by (post re-organised)
Preceded by (new post)	Minister for Finance, Local Government & Public Services; 2003 – 2007	Succeeded by (post re-organised)
