= St John's College, Cardiff =

St John's College
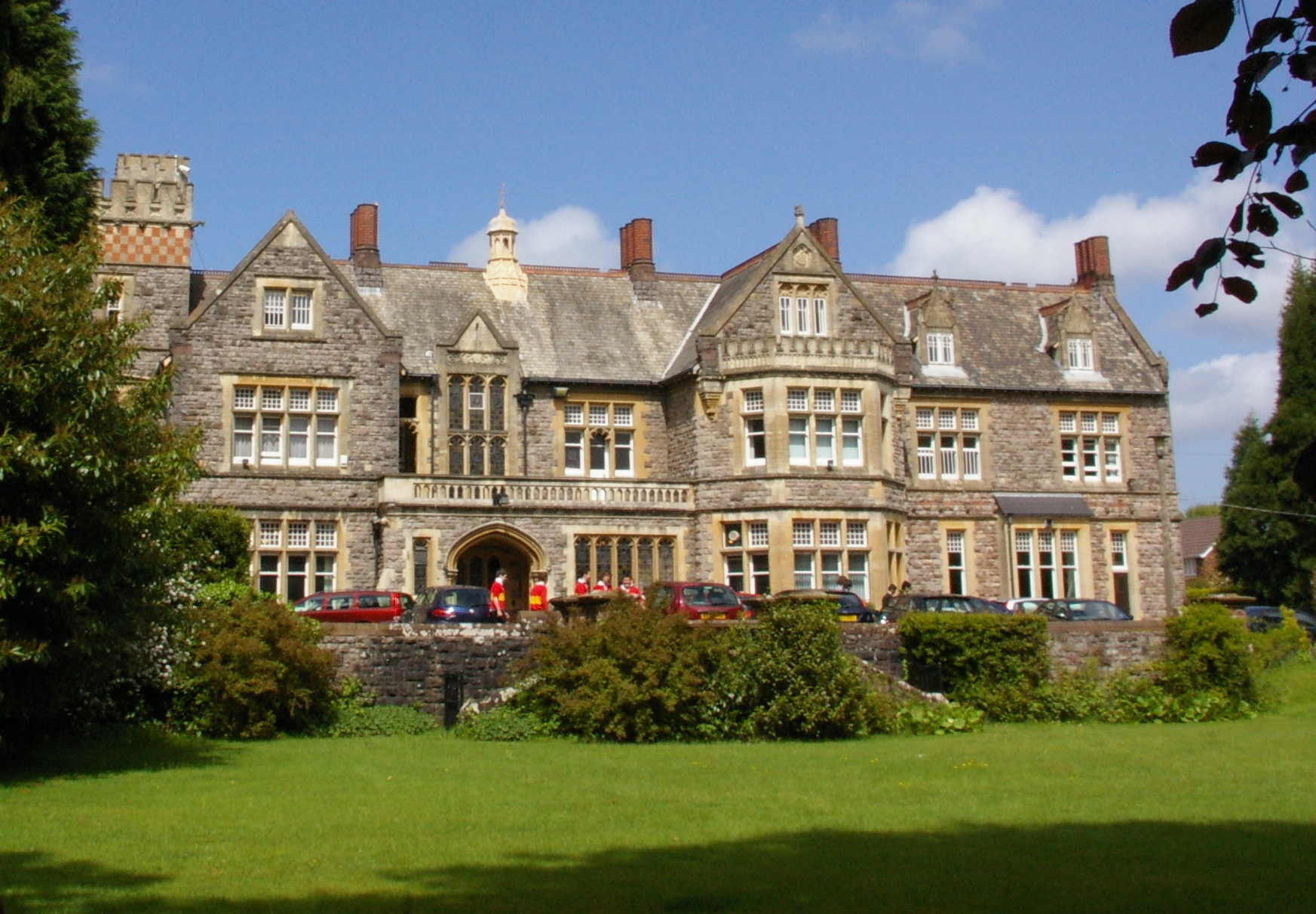

Location
- Newport Road; Cardiff, CF3 5YX; Wales; 51°31′41″N 3°06′40″W

Information
- Type: Private day school Cathedral school
- Motto: Ubi amor, ibi oculus (Wherever there is love, there is vision)
- Religious affiliation: Roman Catholic
- Established: 1987
- Local authority: Cardiff
- Department for Education URN: 402013 Tables
- Headteacher: Shaun Moody
- Gender: Coeducational
- Age: 3 to 18
- Enrolment: 550
- Houses: Bute, De La Salle, Mostyn, St David's
- Colours: Red, Gold
- Website: www.stjohnscollegecardiff.com

St John's College is a private co-educational day school in the village of Old St Mellons in Cardiff, Wales. It is the choir school of Wales' national Catholic cathedral, Cardiff Metropolitan Cathedral.

== History of St John's College ==
=== De La Salle Prep School ===
The De La Salle School for Boys, established in the 1930s, was originally based at 9 Richmond Crescent, Cardiff at a site formerly occupied by St Peter's Catholic Young Men's Society. The School was run by the Brothers of the Christian Schools and sought to provide an education within a strong Christian context. Later, the school moved to a site off Greenway Road near Trowbridge in north-east Cardiff.

In the 1980s the De La Salle School faced imminent closure.

=== St John's College ===
In 1987, Dr David Neville became the founding headteacher of the new school, still located at Greenway Road, opening its doors to both boys and girls up to the age of 16; A Levels were introduced in 1996. Neville (1987 until his death in 2016), emphasised academic and choral foundations and St John's became the choir school to the Metropolitan Cathedral of St David, providing choristers for Sunday Mass and other weekday services. The Inspectorate ESTYN praised the School for its exceptional ethos.

As the school roll grew, it became apparent that St John's had outgrown the site at Greenway Road. In 1995 the college moved to its current site, Ty-to-maen, a mansion built in 1885–9 by the Cardiff architect E. Bruce Vaughan for Richard Allen of Spillers flour mills. It was later owned by Sir William Edgar Nicholls, the manager of Spillers, who gave the house and its estate to the Cardiff Royal Infirmary, when it became the William Nicholls Convalescent Home.

== The Cathedral Choir ==
As the choir school to Cardiff Metropolitan Cathedral, St John's College provides the boy and girl choristers (ages 8–18) for weekly Sunday masses, and sings annual concerts at St David's Hall.

The Choir has given several performances at the Royal Welsh College of Music and Drama, and other venues such as St Bavo’s Cathedral in the Netherlands (2007), Notre Dame Cathedral in Paris (2011), Magdalen College Oxford (2012), Bath Abbey (2013), Christ Church Cathedral Oxford, Madrid Cathedral and El Escorial, as well as Bruges Cathedral and Ghent Cathedral (2014), St Paul’s Cathedral London (2015), Westminster Abbey (2016), Gonville and Caius Chapel and Westminster Cathedral (2017).

The Cathedral Choir sang frequently for the BBC, in live broadcasts on BBC Radio 4, and for Doctor Who and Hollow Crown.

In these years, 2005–17, the Choir sang with BBC National Orchestra of Wales, the Chamber Strings of Melbourne Australia, London Oratory Choir, Philadelphia Boys Choir, Sint Bavo Cathedral Choir, Llandaff Cathedral Choral Society, Uppingham Choir, Gonville & Caius Chapel Choir and The Tallis Scholars. In 2016, the Choir sang for King Charles III.

In recent years, choristers have performed alongside the Prague and Cardiff Philharmonic Orchestras in performances of Symphony No. 3 (Mahler).

== College structure ==
St John's College is divided into four sections: the Nursery and Infants (ages 3–7); the Junior School (ages 8–11); the Senior School (ages 12–16); the Sixth Form College (ages 17–18).

== School performance ==
The examination results achieved by the school are among the best in the UK. In 2017 it was the highest-ranked secondary school in the UK with 98% of pupils attaining A* to B at Advanced Level. This led to St John's being named 'Welsh Independent Secondary School of the Year' in the Sunday Times 'Parent Power' annual supplement.

In 2012, the school was inspected by Estyn and judged excellent. In 2018, it was inspected again and judged excellent in Standards, Well-being and attitudes to learning, and Care, support and guidance; and good in Teaching and learning experiences, and Leadership and management.

== School activities ==
The school has participated in the F1 in Schools competition to design and build a miniature racing car. In 2019, Infinity Racing, a team of 12–13 year old pupils from the school won the Development Class National Finals and competed in the World Finals in Abu Dhabi. Most recently in 2022, Blackout, a team of 15-16 year old pupils also from the school, became runners-up to Team Hydron in the World Finals in Silverstone after achieving the fastest average race time at the competition. They also managed to achieve the Fastest Car in UK History, recording 1.036 seconds at the 2021 Virtual National Finals.
