= Pentwyn, Cardiff =

District and community of Cardiff, Wales

Coordinates: 51.527°N 3.133°W

Pentwyn
- Community
- Location within Cardiff
- Principal area: Cardiff
- Country: Wales
- Sovereign state: United Kingdom
- Police: South Wales
- Fire: South Wales
- Ambulance: Welsh
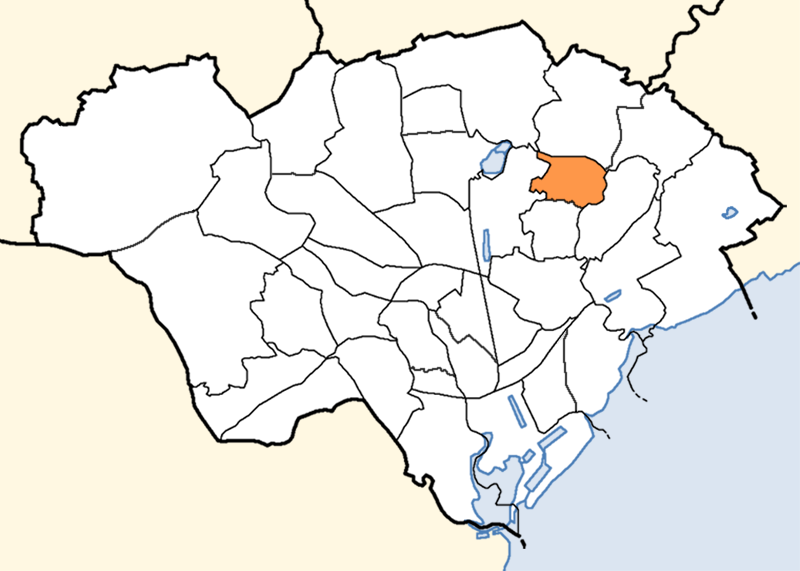
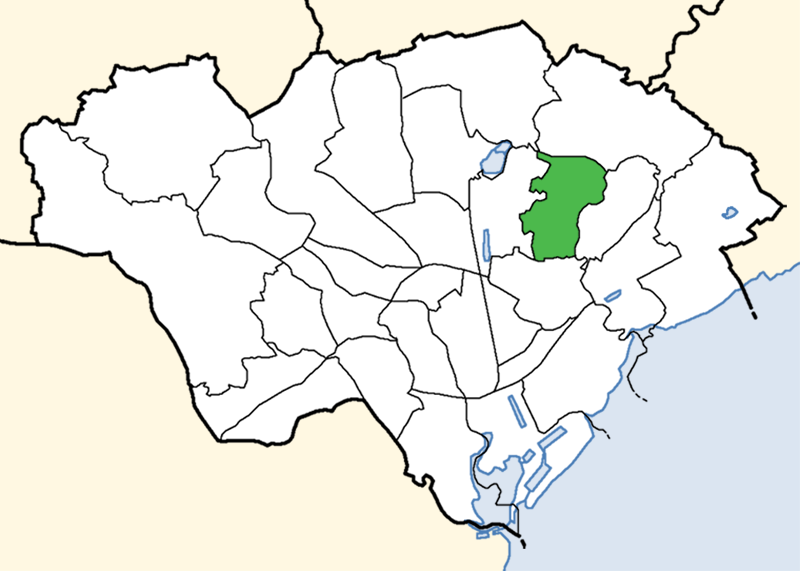
- List of places UK Wales Cardiff

Pentwyn (Welsh pronunciation: [pɛnˈtʊi̯n]) is a district, community and electoral ward in the east of Cardiff, Wales, located northeast of the city centre. Llanedeyrn is immediately to the south, Cyncoed to the west, Pontprennau to the north and the Rhymney River forms the eastern border. The population of the ward taken at the 2011 census was 15,634.

Lisvane	Pontprennau	Old St Mellons
Cyncoed	Pentwyn	Llanrumney
	Llanedeyrn

== Amenities ==
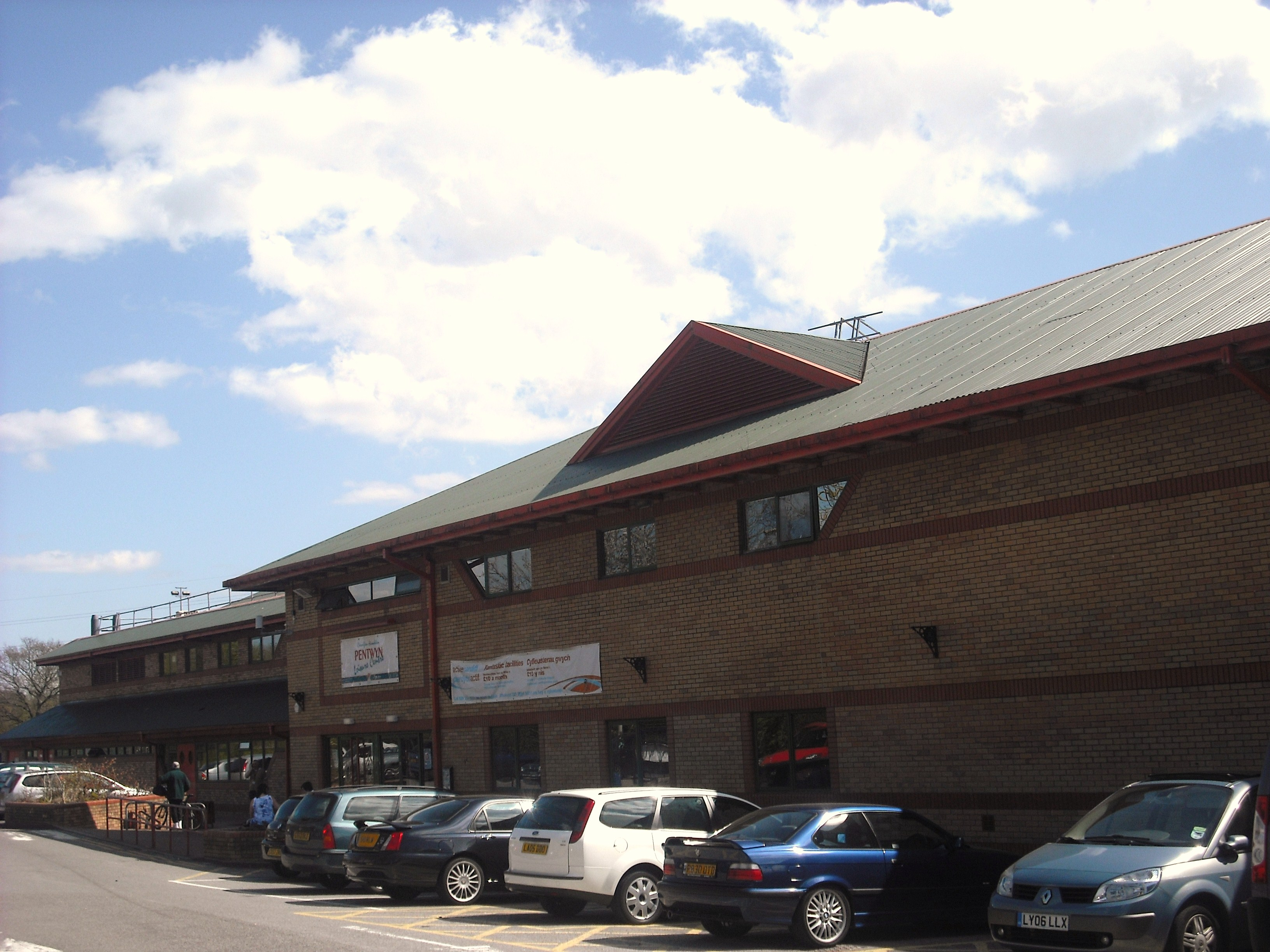
Pentwyn Leisure Centre

Pentwyn has a small shopping centre which includes a One Stop convenience store, fish and chips shop, Indian takeaway, Chinese takeaway and betting shop. The convenience store included a post office until its closure in 2022. Pentwyn Retail Park, situated off the A48 junction near the district, hosts several other stores and food outlets. There are also several branches of supermarket chains in the local area.

Pentwyn is also home to the St David's Medical Centre, which comprises a doctor's surgery, veterinary surgery, dental practice, pharmacy and optician.

Pentwyn Leisure Centre is one of Cardiff's largest; it has a swimming pool with a wave machine, squash courts, multi-activity sports hall, fitness suite, lounge bar and cafeteria. It is built in a similar layout to the Llanishen leisure centre. Behind the leisure centre is a popular skate park. The Leisure Centre is currently closed due to contract issues with GLL the charity that runs Cardiff Leisure Centres.

Pentwyn has five primary schools: The Hollies, St Bernadette's, St David's, Bryn Celyn and Glyncoed. There are currently no high schools in Pentwyn. There is a high school in lisvane on the outskirts of Pentwyn since 1987, a Christianity school.

The area is also home to the 1st Pentwyn Scout Group.

== Governance and politics ==
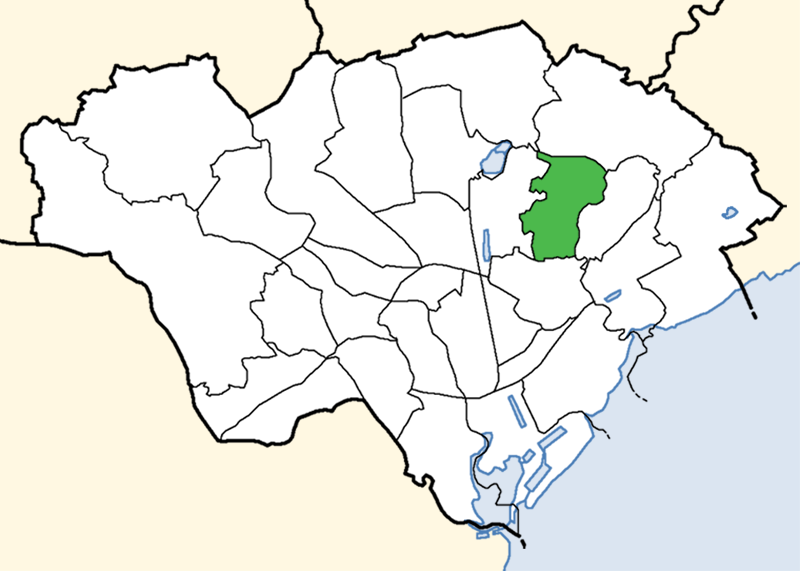
Pentwyn electoral ward in Cardiff

Pentwyn is covered by a Pentwyn electoral ward. It is bounded by the wards of Pontprennau & Old St. Mellons to the north; Llanrumney to the east; Penylan to the south; and Cyncoed to the west.

Pentwyn does not have a community council.

Pentwyn falls within the parliamentary constituency of Cardiff East.

Pentwyn's Senedd Member is Jenny Rathbone from Labour, and its MP is Jo Stevens, also from Labour.

== Culture ==
The 1978 National Eisteddfod of Wales was held in Pentwyn. The Gorsedd stone circle, originally located in Pentwyn, was later moved to Bute Park in central Cardiff.

== Transport ==
Pentwyn is on the 51/53, 55 & 57/58 Cardiff Bus routes from Cardiff Central bus station to Pontprennau via Penylan and Llanedeyrn. It is located close the M4 motorway Junction 30 (Cardiff East), and is served by Cardiff East Park and Ride, which is off the A48/Pentwyn interchange roundabout.
