= Pontprennau and Old St Mellons =

Coordinates: 51.52740°N 3.08396°W

Pontprennau and Old St Mellons ward
- Electoral ward
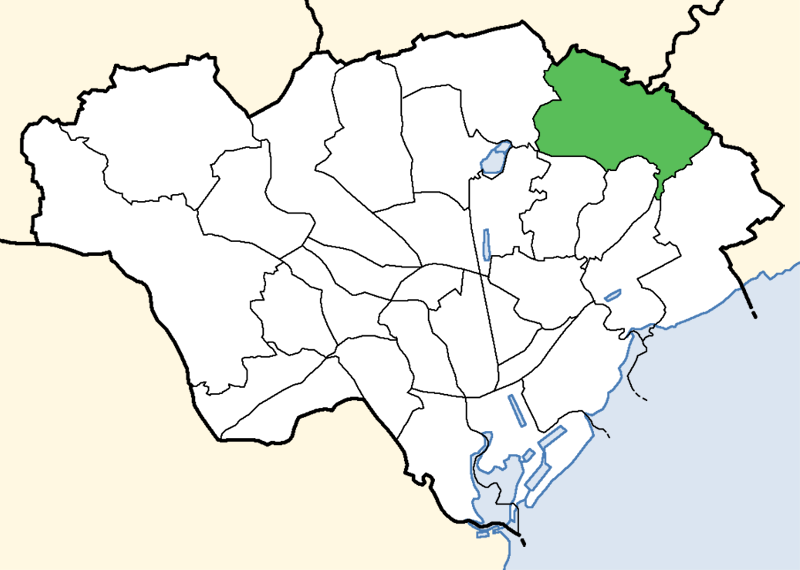
- Location of Pontprennau & Old St Mellons within Cardiff
- Population: 11,714 (2021 Census)
- OS grid reference: ST249815
- Principal area: Cardiff
- Country: Wales
- Sovereign state: United Kingdom
- Post town: CARDIFF
- Postcode district: CF3
- Dialling code: +44-29
- UK Parliament: Cardiff North
- Senedd Cymru – Welsh Parliament: Cardiff North
- Councillors: 2

Pontprennau and Old St Mellons (Welsh: Pontprennau a Phentref Llaneirwg) is an electoral ward in Cardiff, Wales. Covering the communities of Old St Mellons and Pontprennau, it is represented by two councillors on Cardiff Council.

== Description ==
The areas of Pontprennau and Old St Mellons are separated from one another by the A48 road in the northeast of Cardiff. While Old St Mellons is one of the original villages in the area, Pontprennau is a new development of housing and shops.

As of the 2021 Census of Wales, Pontprennau and Old St Mellons has a population of 11,714, which an increase from the 2011 Census of Wales of 9,720 and 8,037 from 2001 Census of Wales. This increase is due to sustained housebuilding in ward such as St Edeyrn's Village and other housing developments as part of Cardiff's Local Development Plan.

It is bounded by Caerphilly county borough to the north; and by the wards of Trowbridge to the southeast; Llanrumney and Pentwyn to the south; and Lisvane to the west.

== Governance ==
The electoral ward falls within the parliamentary constituency of Cardiff North, which has been represented by the Labour Party MP Anna McMorrin since 2017.

In the Senedd, Cardiff North is represented by Welsh Labour MS Julie Morgan.

=== Local Government ===
In May 2017 the Conservative Party won back the seat they'd lost to Labour in 2012.

Cardiff Council election, 4 May 2017
Party	Candidate	Votes	%	±%
Conservative	Dianne Rees *	1,851	30%	
Conservative	Joel Williams	1,760	28%	
Labour	Georgina Phillips *	1,134	18%	
Labour	Shane Andrews	891	14%	
Plaid Cymru	David Davies	200	3%	
Liberal Democrats	Mary Naughton	176	3%	
Liberal Democrats	David Keigwin	167	3%	
Turnout		3,216	45%	

* = sitting councillor prior to the election

After the May 2012 election the ward was represented at Cardiff Council by Georgina Phillips of Welsh Labour (1326 votes) and Dianne Rees of the Welsh Conservative Party (1004 votes). Cllr Phillips won back the seat that she'd lost at the May 2008 election, unseating sitting Conservative councillor Jane Rogers.

Prior to 1999 the ward included neighbouring Lisvane and was called Lisvane & St Mellons.
