= Old St Mellons =

Village and community in Cardiff, Wales

Coordinates: 51.530°N 3.112°W

Old St Mellons: Welsh: Pentre Llaneirwg
- Community
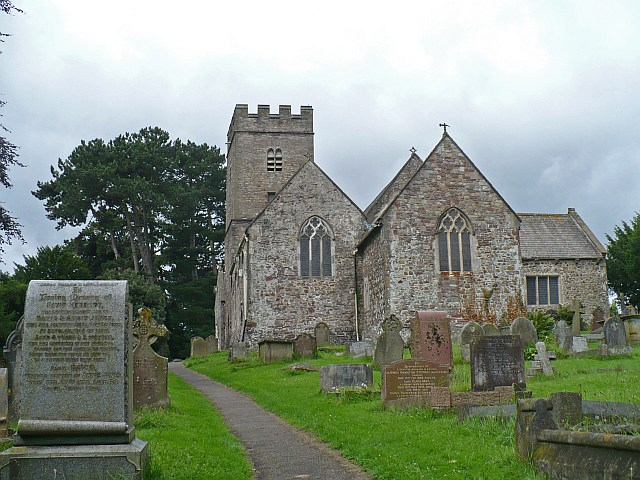
- St Mellons Parish Church

- Location within Cardiff
- Principal area: Cardiff
- Country: Wales
- Sovereign state: United Kingdom
- Police: South Wales
- Fire: South Wales
- Ambulance: Welsh
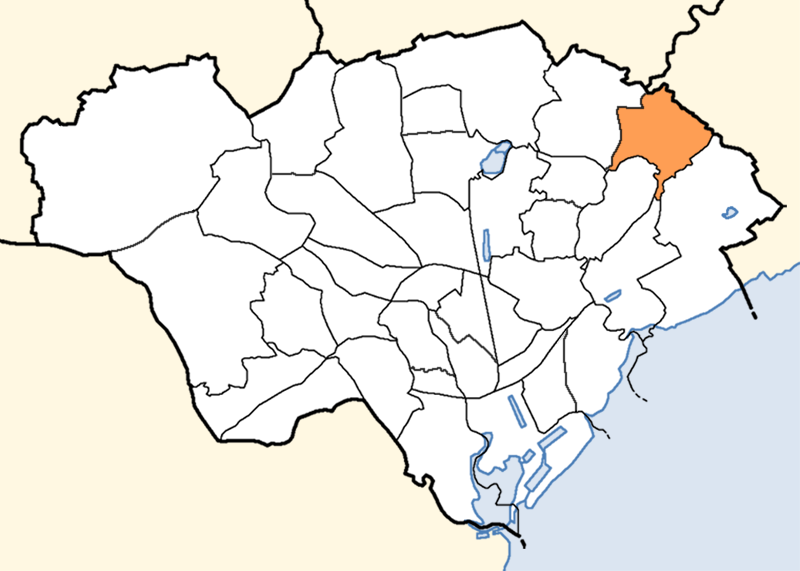
- List of places UK Wales Cardiff Map of the community

Old St Mellons (Welsh: Pentre Llaneirwg) is a village and community on the eastern edge of Cardiff, Wales. Lying to the east of the Rhymney River, it forms part of the historic county of Monmouthshire. It is separated from the modern St Mellons suburb by the main road to Newport – the Newport Road (B4487) – and which was formerly the A48 road.

The population of the community in 2011 was 2,367 and one of the smallest in Cardiff.

== History and description ==
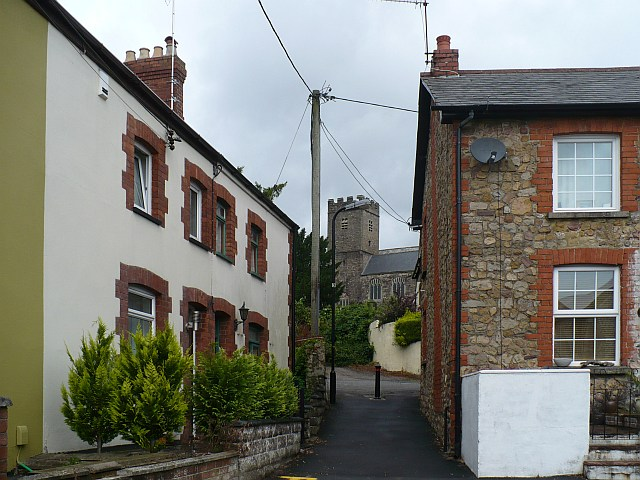
Old St Mellons

Old St Mellons is made up largely of 19th-century housing, a village hall and several pubs and shops. The village has a school (St. Mellons Church in Wales Primary School), converted in 1854 from the 17th-century Poor House, but this was demolished after it closed in the 1980s. Rather than accept the permanent closure of the school, Rev. Russell C. Williams and Mr. Robert W. Harris (both of St. Mellons Baptist Church) led the children and parents to the nearby Village Hall, where the children were taught until more permanent surroundings could be found. After making use of empty classrooms in Pen-y-Bryn Primary School (Llanrumney), the village school moved into Pen-y-Bryn's ‘annex’ building. This soon became the permanent home of the school, and one they occupied until moving to a new, purpose built building on Bridge Road, Old St. Mellons. After many years, the school was finally back in the original village of St. Mellons. There are 15 nationally listed buildings and structures in the village, including St John's College, St Julian's Manor and two public houses. As of 2007 there were four pubs, indicating the importance of St Mellons as a resting point on the route to London. Because St Mellons lay in Monmouthshire, it also avoided having to abide by the Welsh Sunday Closing Act.

St Mellons Church is the Church in Wales parish church and dates from the 14th-century, noted for its unusual plan and double arch to the chancel. It is Grade I listed, while the lychgate to the churchyard is listed Grade II. Bethany Presbyterian Church is also located in the village.

Old St Mellons was designated a Conservation Area in 1976, giving Cardiff Council statutory powers to prevent certain changes, while preserving and improving the historical character of the village.

== Government ==
The Old St Mellons community was created from the eastern part (largely the Old St Mellons ward) of the previously existing St Mellons community in 1996. The remaining part of the St Mellons community became Pontprennau.

The village is part of the Cardiff Council ward of Pontprennau & Old St. Mellons, which in turn is part of the UK Parliament/Senedd Cymru constituencies of Cardiff North. The new St Mellons to the south is part of a different ward and parliamentary constituencies.

Known variously as St Melans or Llaneurwg, St Mellons was previously governed by Monmouthshire County Council between 1889 and 1974, and St Mellons Rural District Council between 1894 and 1935, which included other villages and settlements as far as the edge of Newport. Between 1935 and 1974 the Rural District was merged with that of Magor.

=== Community Council ===
Old St Mellons elects a community council, comprising seven councillors, with two further seats available for co-option (April 2020). The council is funded by a local precept on council tax bills in Old St Mellons and provides a range of community support. Elections are held every five years. The last election was held at the same time as the 2017 Cardiff Council election and the next election is due to be held in May 2022.

== St Edeyrn's Village ==
Plans were unveiled in 2014 to build yet more modern housing on open fields within the Old St Mellons community.

As part of Cardiff's Local Development Plan a new village of over 1,000 homes is being built by Persimmon Homes, and will include new shops, play areas and allotments.
