= Cardiff City Council =

Local government of Cardiff, Wales from 1974 to 1996

Cardiff City Council Cyngor Dinas Caerdydd
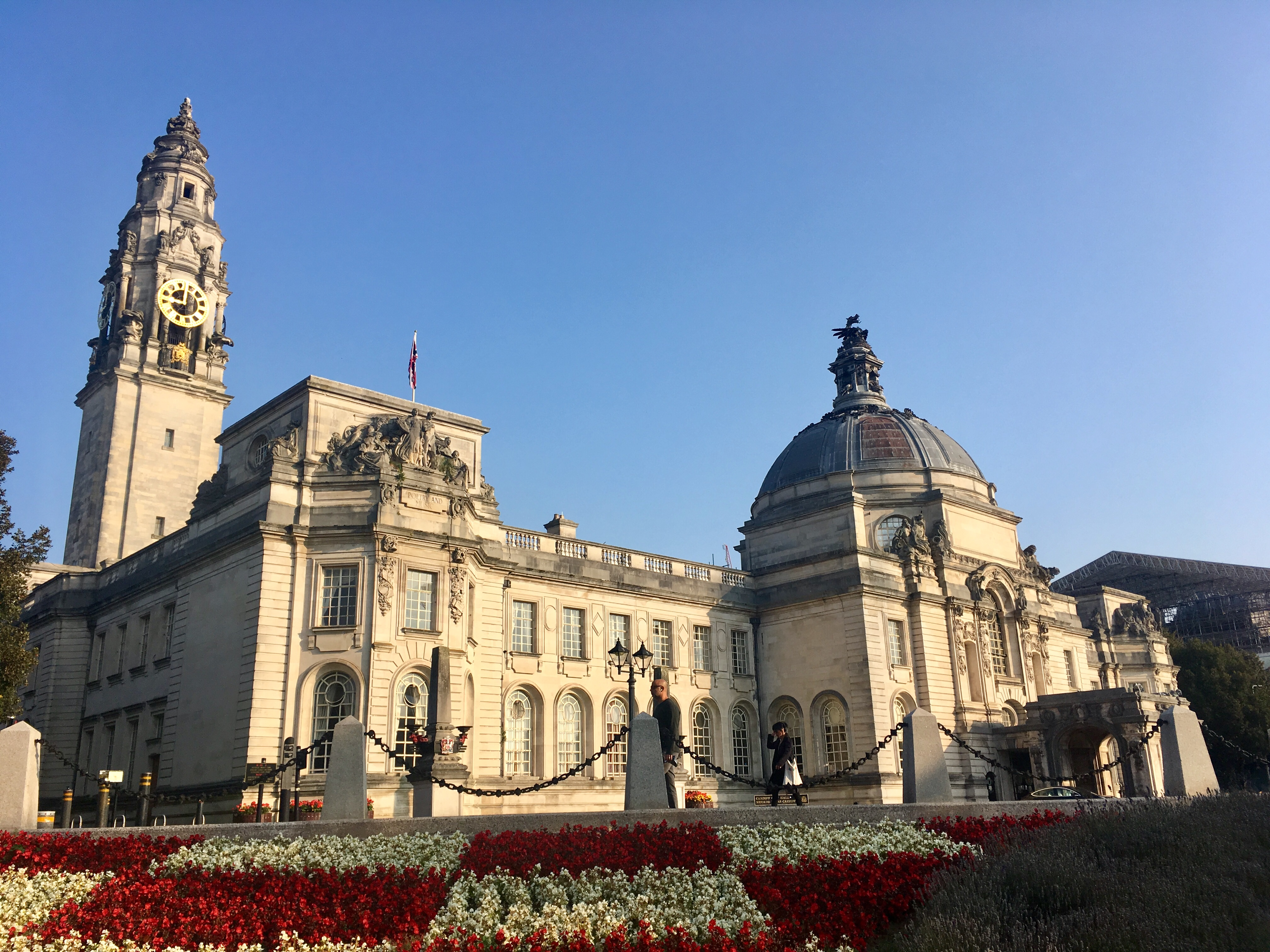
- City Hall, Cardiff

History
- Founded: 1 April 1974
- Disbanded: 1 April 1996
- Preceded by: Cardiff County Borough Council
- Succeeded by: Cardiff Council

Elections
- First election: 10 May 1973
- Last election: 2 May 1991
- Next election: N/A

Cardiff City Council was the local government district authority that administered the city of Cardiff, capital of Wales, from 1974 until 1996. The district council replaced the pre-1974 county borough council. It was succeeded in 1996 by Cardiff Council.

== History ==
Local government in England and Wales was reorganised following the Local Government Act 1972. The old administrative county of Glamorgan was subdivided, with Cardiff and the Vale between Cardiff and Bridgend forming South Glamorgan. South Glamorgan County Council came into existence on 1 April 1974. The administration of the area was further subdivided between the two district councils, Cardiff City Council (later Cardiff Council) and the Vale of Glamorgan Borough Council (later the Vale of Glamorgan Council).

Cardiff City Council ceased to exist following the 1996 local government reorganisation, replaced by the unitary authority of the Cardiff Council. In effect, the old city council took over the county level functions of the abolished South Glamorgan County Council.

== Political control ==
Prior to 1974, Cardiff had traditionally been a Conservative Party stronghold, but the city council's first administration in 1974 had a Labour Party majority, reflecting the changing social composition of the city. Control of the council changed regularly during its existence, between Labour, Conservative and a period from 1987 to 1991 when no party had a majority. The first election to the reconstituted council was held in 1973, initially operating as a shadow authority alongside the outgoing authorities until it came into its powers on 1 April 1974. Political control of the council from 1974 until its abolition in 1996 was as follows:

Party in control	Years
Labour	1974–1976
Conservative	1976–1979
Labour	1979–1983
Conservative	1983–1987
No overall control	1987–1991
Labour	1991–1996

=== Leadership ===
The leaders of the council were:

Councillor	Party	From	To
Philip Dunleavy	Labour	1974	1976
Ron Watkiss	Conservative	1976	1979
Philip Dunleavy	Labour	1979	1982
John Reynolds	Labour	1982	May 1983
Ron Watkiss	Conservative	May 1983	May 1987
John Reynolds	Labour	May 1987	10 Apr 1990
John Phillips	Labour	May 1990	May 1994
Sue Essex	Labour	May 1994	31 Mar 1996

Labour's Philip Dunleavy was the first leader of the council from 1974 to 1976, then again from 1979 to 1982 (when Labour regained its majority). He became Lord Mayor of Cardiff in 1982-3. Dunleavy was a driving force behind the creation of St David's Hall, the Cardiff Ice Rink and other initiatives.

Councillor Ron Watkiss was Conservative leader of the council during their majority administration from May 1983 to May 1987.

Llanrumney councillor John Reynolds became leader of the minority Labour administration in 1987 (he had been leader of the Labour group since 1982). He died in 1990.

Councillor John Phillips subsequently became leader of the Labour group. Described as a Labour 'traditionalist', in 1994 he was ousted by Sue Essex of the 'new urban left', who had been promoting a green agenda in Cardiff through the 1990s.

The last leader of the city council, Sue Essex, narrowly lost to Russell Goodway (the last leader of South Glamorgan County Council) in the election to be leader of the Labour group and hence the new council.

== Elections ==
At the first Cardiff City Council elections in 1973, 75 city councillors were elected from 21 electoral wards. From 1983, the number of wards increased to 26. From 1987, the number of councillors reduced to 65.

Year	Seats	**Labour**	**Conservative**	**Liberal Democrats** (Note: Includes Liberals and SDP pre-1988.)	**Other**	Notes
1973	75	**42**	33	-	-	
1976	75	29	**44**	-	2	
1979	75	**41**	34	-	-	
1983	65	28	**44**	3	-	New ward boundaries.
1987	65	**29**	25	11	-	
1991	65	**39**	16	9	1	

Party with most elected councillors in bold.

== Premises ==
The council was headquartered at City Hall in Cathays Park, which had been built in 1905 for the former Cardiff County Borough Council.

== Bibliography ==
- Alan Hooper; John Punter (Eds.) Capital Cardiff 1975–2020: Regeneration, Competitiveness and the Urban Environment. University of Wales Press (2006), ISBN 0-7083-2063-5.
