= Lisvane and St Mellons =

Former electoral ward in Cardiff, Wales

Lisvane and St Mellons was an electoral ward in the northeast of the city of Cardiff, Wales. It included the communities of Lisvane and St Mellons.

The ward was created following The City of Cardiff (Electoral Arrangements) Order 1982, coming into effect with the county council elections in 1983. The ward elected one county councillor to South Glamorgan County Council, until 1995 when it elected its councillor to the new City of Cardiff Council.

In 1995 it elected a Conservative councillor, John Winterson Richards, who prior to the 1999 elections was the only Conservative councillor on the council.

In 1999 the ward was divided to become a new Lisvane ward and Pontprennau and Old St Mellons, with the growth of the new suburb of Pontprennau in the area.
