= Jacqui Gasson =

British politician (c.1938–2020)

Jacqueline-Anne Gasson (c. 1938 – 14 June 2020) was a British politician. She was an elected councillor and member of South Glamorgan County Council and Cardiff Council, Wales between 1988 and 2012. From 2004 to 2005, she was Lord Mayor of Cardiff, the first ever member of the Liberal Democrats to hold this post.

== Political career ==
Gasson, a former member of the Social Democratic Party, was elected to the Cardiff council in 1988 as a member of the Liberal Democrats, just after the party's formation. She represented Caerau, a ward in west Cardiff in a traditionally Labour area. She made her mark in the early 1990s raising concerns about Cardiff's social services provision. In 1992, 1997 and 2001 she contested Cardiff West at the general election but failed to be elected.

For the year 2004 to 2005 Gasson became Lord Mayor of Cardiff and was the first Liberal Democrat to hold this office (though Cardiff has had Liberal mayors in the past, for example John Batchelor). She later claimed she had used this period to successfully create links between local businesses and universities. "I've always believed the role [of mayor] should have a high status because the Lord Mayor is the flag waver for the city. I attended hundreds if not thousands of functions when I was in office" she later said. In October 2004 the Lord Mayor pulled out of a gala dinner in protest because of the invitation of a homophobic Christian evangelist Luis Palau.

Gasson was a member of the South Wales Police Authority.

At the Liberal Democrat Party Conference in 2006 Gasson (then age 68) spoke about her personal experience as a victim of rape 40 years earlier. The conference was discussing the policy of granting anonymity to men accused of rape.

In the May 2012 local government elections, Gasson lost her council seat, after 24 years service. "It has been a privilege and an honour, but national trends have beaten us", she said.

Gasson died on 14 June 2020.
