= List of electoral wards in Cardiff =

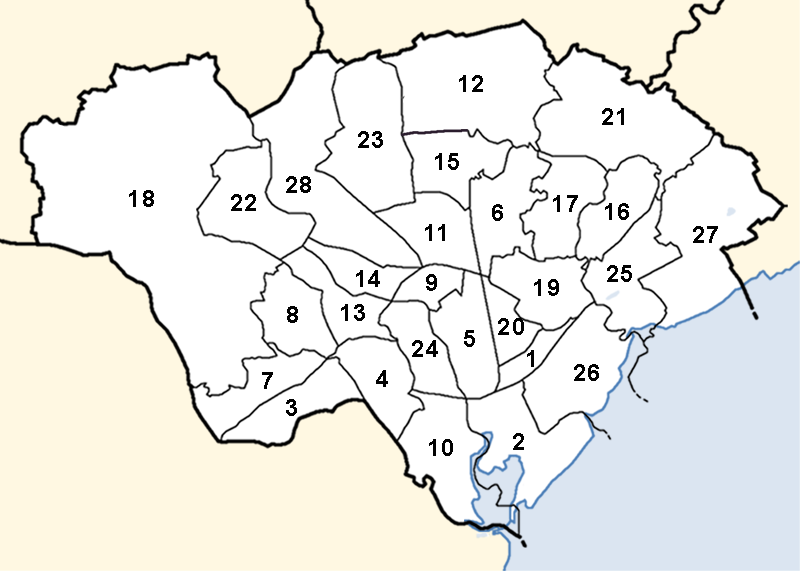
Numbered map of current county electoral wards (alphabetical order) of Cardiff

This list of electoral wards in Cardiff includes electoral wards in the city and county of Cardiff, Wales. It also includes Community Council wards. There were further ward changes effective from the May 2022 Cardiff Council election, as a result of a 2020 boundary review.

== Current county wards ==
The unitary authority area is divided into 28 electoral wards. Many of these wards are coterminous with communities of the same name. The following table lists council wards, communities and associated geographical areas. Communities with a community council are indicated with an asterisk.

| Ward | | County councillors | Communities | Other geographic areas |
|---|---|---|---|---|
| 1 | Adamsdown | 2 | Adamsdown | |
| 2 | Butetown | 3 | Butetown | Atlantic Wharf, Cardiff Bay, Cardiff city centre (part), Tiger Bay, Flatholm |
| 3 | Caerau | 2 | Caerau | Culverhouse Cross |
| 4 | Canton | 3 | Canton | Leckwith, Victoria Park |
| 5 | Cathays | 4 | Cathays and Castle | Blackweir, Cardiff city centre (Castle), Cathays, Cathays Park, Maindy |
| 6 | Cyncoed | 3 | Cyncoed | Roath Park, Lakeside |
| 7 | Ely | 3 | Ely | Culverhouse Cross, Michaelston-super-Ely |
| 8 | Fairwater | 3 | Fairwater | Pentrebane |
| 9 | Gabalfa | 2 | Gabalfa | Mynachdy, Maindy, Heath |
| 10 | Grangetown | 4 | Grangetown | Cardiff Bay (part), Saltmead, International Sports Village |
| 11 | Heath | 3 | Heath | Birchgrove |
| 12 | Lisvane and Thornhill | 3 | Lisvane* and Thornhill | Cefn Onn |
| 13 | Llandaff | 2 | Llandaff | Danescourt |
| 14 | Llandaff North | 2 | Llandaff North | Hailey Park, Lydstep Park, Mynachdy, Gabalfa |
| 15 | Llanishen | 2 | Llanishen | |
| 16 | Llanrumney | 3 | Llanrumney | |
| 17 | Pentwyn | 3 | Pentwyn and Llanedeyrn | |
| 18 | Pentyrch and St Fagans | 3 | Pentyrch* and St Fagans* | Capel Llanilltern, Coedbychan, Creigiau, Gwaelod-y-Garth, Rhydlafar |
| 19 | Penylan | 3 | Penylan | |
| 20 | Plasnewydd | 4 | Roath | Cardiff city centre (part) |
| 21 | Pontprennau and Old St Mellons | 2 | Old St. Mellons* and Pontprennau | Llanedeyrn Village |
| 22 | Radyr | 2 | Radyr & Morganstown* | Morganstown, Radyr |
| 23 | Rhiwbina | 3 | Rhiwbina | Pantmawr, Rhydwaedlyd, Wenallt |
| 24 | Riverside | 3 | Riverside and Pontcanna | Part of Cardiff city centre, Llandaff Fields, Sophia Gardens |
| 25 | Rumney | 2 | Rumney | |
| 26 | Splott | 3 | Splott and Tremorfa | Pengam Green |
| 27 | Trowbridge | 3 | Trowbridge | St Mellons estate, Cefn Mably, Wentloog |
| 28 | Whitchurch & Tongwynlais | 4 | Tongwynlais* and Whitchurch | Blaengwynlais, Bwlch-y-cwm, Coedcefngarw, Coryton, Cwmnofydd, Graig-goch, Llandaff North |

== Ward changes 2022 ==
In October 2021 Cardiff Council accepted a large number ward change proposals of the Local Democracy and Boundary Commission for Wales, with only slight modification. These were to take effect from the 2022 council election.

Twenty-one wards were to remain unchanged: Adamsdown, Caerau, Canton, Cathays, Cyncoed, Ely, Fairwater, Gabalfa, Heath, Llandaff, Llandaff North, Llanrumney, Penylan, Plasnewydd, Pontprennau/Old St Mellons (but renamed "Pontprennau and Old St Mellons"), Rhiwbina, Riverside, Rumney, Splott, Trowbridge, Whitchurch and Tongwynlais.

Of the other wards:

- Butetown (electoral ward) would have an increase from 1 to 3 councillors.
- Creigiau/St Fagans would be merged with the Pentyrch ward and renamed "Pentyrch and St Fagans", with a total increase in councillors from 2 to 3.
- Grangetown would have an increase from 3 to 4 councillors.
- Lisvane to be renamed "Lisvane and Thornhill" with the addition of Thornhill from the neighbouring Llanishen ward and an increase from 1 to 3 councillors.
- Llanishen would see a decrease in councillors, from 4 to 2, following the transfer of Thornhill to Lisvane.
- Pentwyn would see a decrease in councillors, from 4 to 3.
- Radyr would have an increase from 1 to 2 councillors.

== County wards 1995 to 2022 ==
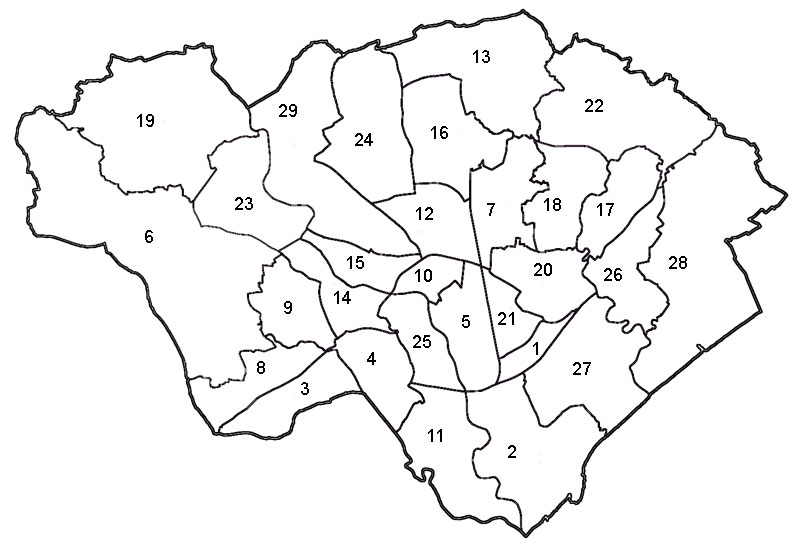
Electoral ward map of Cardiff, 1999–2022.

The post-1996 unitary authority of the City and County of Cardiff has since 1999 been divided into 29 electoral wards returning 75 councillors to Cardiff Council. Many of these wards are coterminous with communities (civil parishes) of the same name. The following table lists council wards, numbers of councillors, associated communities and geographical areas:

| Ward | | County councillors | Communities | Other geographic areas |
|---|---|---|---|---|
| 1 | Adamsdown ^{c} | 2 | Adamsdown | |
| 2 | Butetown ^{c} | 1 | Butetown | Atlantic Wharf, Cardiff Bay, Cardiff city centre (part), Tiger Bay, Flatholm |
| 3 | Caerau ^{c} | 2 | Caerau | Culverhouse Cross |
| 4 | Canton ^{c} | 3 | Canton | Leckwith, Victoria Park |
| 5 | Cathays | 4 | Cathays and Castle | Blackweir, Cardiff city centre, Cathays, Cathays Park, Maindy |
| 6 | Creigiau & St. Fagans | 1 | Pentyrch* (part: Creigiau ward) and St Fagans* | Coedbychan, Capel Llanilltern, Rhydlafar |
| 7 | Cyncoed ^{c} | 3 | Cyncoed | Roath Park, Lakeside |
| 8 | Ely ^{c} | 3 | Ely | Culverhouse Cross, Michaelston-super-Ely |
| 9 | Fairwater ^{c} | 3 | Fairwater | Pentrebane |
| 10 | Gabalfa ^{c} | 2 | Gabalfa | Mynachdy, Maindy, Heath |
| 11 | Grangetown ^{c} | 3 | Grangetown | Cardiff Bay (part), Saltmead, International Sports Village |
| 12 | Heath ^{c} | 3 | Heath | Birchgrove |
| 13 | Lisvane ^{c} | 1 | Lisvane* | Cefn Onn |
| 14 | Llandaff ^{c} | 2 | Llandaff | Danescourt |
| 15 | Llandaff North ^{c} | 2 | Llandaff North | Hailey Park, Lydstep Park, Mynachdy, Gabalfa |
| 16 | Llanishen | 4 | Llanishen and Thornhill | |
| 17 | Llanrumney ^{c} | 3 | Llanrumney | |
| 18 | Pentwyn | 4 | Pentwyn and Llanedeyrn (since 2016) | |
| 19 | Pentyrch | 1 | Pentyrch* (part: Gwaelod-y-Garth and Pentyrch wards) | Gwaelod-y-Garth |
| 20 | Penylan ^{c} | 3 | Penylan | |
| 21 | Plasnewydd | 4 | Roath | Cardiff city centre (part) |
| 22 | Pontprennau / Old St Mellons | 2 | Old St. Mellons* and Pontprennau | Llanedeyrn Village |
| 23 | Radyr | 1 | Radyr & Morganstown* | Morganstown, Radyr |
| 24 | Rhiwbina ^{c} | 3 | Rhiwbina | Pantmawr, Rhydwaedlyd, Wenallt |
| 25 | Riverside | 3 | Riverside and Pontcanna | part of Cardiff city centre, Llandaff Fields, Sophia Gardens |
| 26 | Rumney ^{c} | 2 | Rumney | |
| 27 | Splott | 3 | Splott and Tremorfa | Pengam Green |
| 28 | Trowbridge ^{c} | 3 | Trowbridge | St Mellons estate, Cefn Mably, Wentloog |
| 29 | Whitchurch & Tongwynlais | 4 | Tongwynlais* and Whitchurch | Blaengwynlais, Bwlch-y-cwm, Coedcefngarw, Coryton, Cwmnofydd, Graig-goch, Llandaff North |

* = Community which elects a community council
^{c} = County ward coterminous with community of the same name

=== 1995 ===
Prior to the 1999 election, Lisvane and (Old) St Mellons were combined in a "Lisvane and St Mellons" ward, returning 1 councillor. Radyr was combined with St Fagans in a "Radyr and St Fagans" ward, returning 1 councillor. Creigiau returned its own councillor.

== Community wards ==
The communities of Lisvane, Pentyrch and Creigiau, Radyr and St Fagans elect their own community councils.

- Lisvane Community Council comprises 10 community councillors elected from the community ward of Lisvane.
- Pentyrch Community Council comprises 13 community councillors elected from the community wards of Creigiau, Gwaelod-y-Garth and Pentyrch.
- Radyr and Morganstown Community Council comprises 11 community councillors elected from the community wards of Morganstown, Radyr North and Radyr South.
- St Fagans Community Council comprises 9 community councillors elected from the community ward of St Fagans.

== 1890 ==
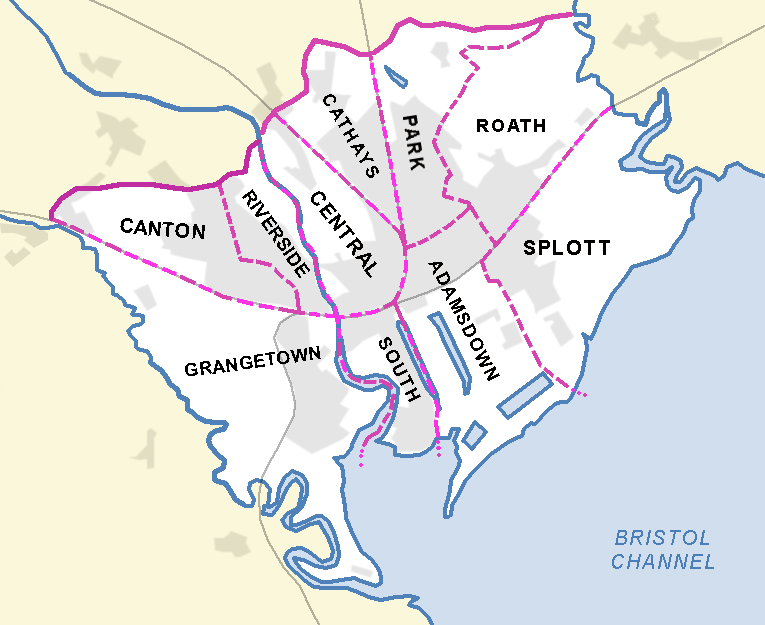
Wards of Cardiff, 1890

Following the creation of Cardiff County Borough Council in 1889, in 1890 the number of electoral wards was increased from 5 to 10. Each ward was represented by 3 councillors.

- Adamsdown
- Canton
- Cathays
- Central
- Grangetown
- Park
- Riverside
- Roath
- South
- Splott

== See also ==
- List of electoral wards in Wales
