= 1928 Cardiff City Council election =

Local election in Cardiff, Wales

The 1928 Cardiff City Council election was held on Monday 1 November 1928 to elect councillors to Cardiff City Council in Cardiff, Glamorgan, Wales. It took place on the same day as many other local elections in Wales and England.

This was the tenth annual all-Cardiff elections since the 1914-18 Great War. The previous elections were in November 1927 and the next annual all-Cardiff elections were to take place in November 1929.

== Background ==
Cardiff County Borough Council had been created in 1889. Cardiff became a city in 1905. The council consisted of 39 councillors who were elected by the town's voters and thirteen aldermen who were elected by the councillors. Elections to the local authority were held annually, though not all council seats were included in each contest, because the four councillors in each ward stood down for election in three-yearly rotation.

Thirteen seats were up for election in November 1928. One Labour held seat was uncontested. Labour ran candidates in all 13 wards. There were eight Conservative candidates, six Liberals, 2 Independents and one Communist.

== Overview of the result ==
Turnout was 61.0%, up on 1927 (42.4%) and 1925 (56.4%). Labour won seven seats, Conservatives three, Liberals two and Independents one.

=== Council composition ===
Following the November 1927 election the balance on the city council was 18 Liberal, 18 Conservative, 13 Labour and 3 Others. In 1929 Labour increased their number by two, Conservative and Independent dropped by one each. The Liberals remained unchanged.

== Ward results ==
* ='retiring' ward councillor for re-election Percentage changes from 1925.

=== Adamsdown ===
Adamsdown
Party	Candidate	Votes	%	±%
Labour	John Donovan	unopposed		
Labour hold		Swing	n/a	

=== Canton ===
Canton
Party	Candidate	Votes	%	±%
Labour	John Heginbottom	1,826	40.7	+16.3
Liberal	AJ Dyne	1,445	32.2	+9.2
Conservative	WA Prichard	1,211	27.0	−25.5
Turnout		4,482	60.3	+12.1
Labour gain from Conservative		Swing	+3.55	

=== Cathays ===
Cathays
Party	Candidate	Votes	%	±%
Labour	Arthur Ernest Gough*	3,022	61.2	+10.1
Independent	Owen T Morris	1,918	38.8	n/a
Turnout		4,940	61.6	−0.3
Labour hold		Swing	n/a	

=== Central ===
Central
Party	Candidate	Votes	%	±%
Conservative	Joseph Gerald Gaskell	1,682	51.1	+6.0
Labour	James Patrick Collins	1,608	48.9	+18.2
Turnout		3,290	56.9	−4.2
Conservative hold		Swing	n/a	

=== Gabalfa ===
Gabalfa
Party	Candidate	Votes	%	±%
Independent	Alfred Ernest Shippobotham*	2,309	55.3	+7.1
Labour	HJ Brown	1,870	44.7	+17.4
Turnout		4,179	56.0	−6.4
Independent hold		Swing	-5.15	

=== Grangetown ===
Grangetown
Party	Candidate	Votes	%	±%
Labour	Ivor George Duddridge*	2,482	63.4	−16.4
Liberal	TL Francis	1,435	36.6	n/a
Turnout		3,917	62.1	+22.5
Labour hold		Swing	n/a	

=== Llandaff ===
Llandaff
Party	Candidate	Votes	%	±%
Labour	EJ Draper	2,890	51.3	+12.3
Conservative	Alfred Edward Lougher*	2,742	48.7	−12.3
Turnout		5,632	56.8	+8.0
Labour gain from Conservative		Swing	+12.3	

=== Penylan ===
Penylan
Party	Candidate	Votes	%	±%
Liberal	G Williams	2,050	49.7	−3.9
Conservative	TR Evans	1,247	30.2	−16.2
Labour	R Stanton	831	20.1	n/a
Turnout		4,128	65.5	+6.2
Liberal hold		Swing	n/a	

=== Plasnewydd ===
Plasnewydd
Party	Candidate	Votes	%	±%
Conservative	C Hoare*	1,663	37.9	−1.9
Liberal	Edward John Sawyer	1,368	31.2	−4.6
Labour	IT Rees	1,356	30.9	+6.5
Turnout		4,387	66.6	
Conservative hold		Swing	n/a	

=== Riverside ===
Riverside
Party	Candidate	Votes	%	±%
Conservative	Walter Howell Parker*	1,980	62.9	n/a
Labour	Frederick Saw	1,166	37.1	n/a
Turnout		3,146	46.4	n/a
Conservative hold		Swing	n/a	

=== Roath ===
Roath
Party	Candidate	Votes	%	±%
Liberal	George Frederick Evans*	2,470	50.7	n/a
Labour	AJ Phillips	1,353	27.8	n/a
Conservative	HE White	1,048	21.5	n/a
Turnout		4,871	69.0	n/a
Liberal hold		Swing	n/a	

=== South ===
South
Party	Candidate	Votes	%	±%
Labour	Joshua Thomas Clatworthy	1,759	49.4	+17.4
Conservative	Frederick Jones*	1,743	49.0	−11.7
Communist	Reginald Cosslett	57	1.6	−5.7
Turnout		3,559	62.5	+13.2
Labour gain from Conservative		Swing	+14.55	

=== Splott ===
Splott
Party	Candidate	Votes	%	±%
Labour	A Lewis	3,104	53.9	+6.8
Liberal	Edward James Wilmot	2,655	46.1	n/a
Turnout		5,759	68.9	+1.0
Labour gain from Independent		Swing	n/a	
