= Llanrumney (electoral ward) =

Llanrumney ward
- Electoral ward
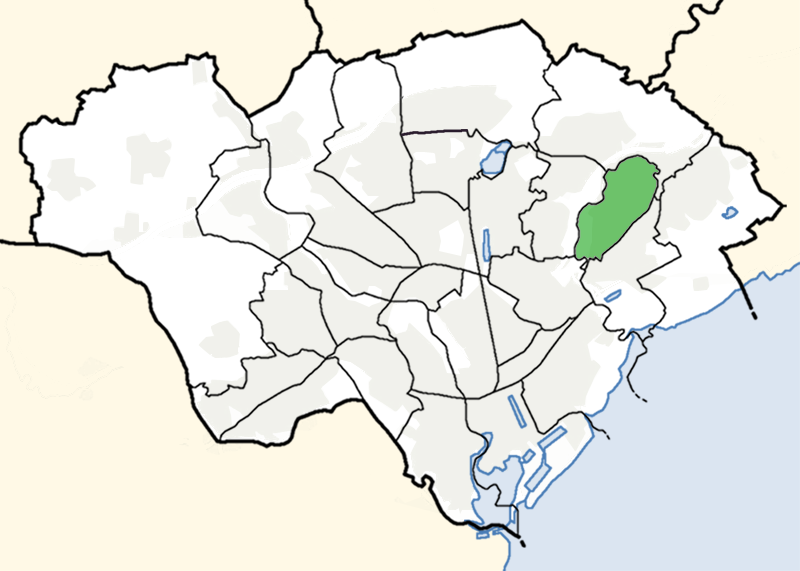
- Location of Llanrumney ward within Cardiff
- Population: 11,596 (2021 census)
- Community: Llanrumney
- Principal area: Cardiff
- Country: Wales
- Sovereign state: United Kingdom
- Post town: CARDIFF
- Postcode district: CF3
- Dialling code: +44-29
- UK Parliament: Cardiff East
- Senedd Cymru – Welsh Parliament: Cardiff South and Penarth
- Councillors: 3

Llanrumney is an electoral ward in the east of Cardiff, capital city of Wales. It covers the working class residential community of Llanrumney. The ward has elected Labour Party councillors to the local Cardiff authority.

== Description ==
The Llanrumney ward is bordered to the south by the Rumney ward, to the north by Pontprennau and Old St Mellons, to the west by the River Rhymney and the Pentwyn ward.

It was created by The City of Cardiff (Electoral Arrangements) Order 1982 which came into effect from the May 1983 Cardiff City Council election.

== Representatives ==
Since 1983 the Llanrumney ward elected three councillors to Cardiff City Council and (since 1996) to the County Council of the City and County of Cardiff. Since 1983 the ward has consistently elected Labour Party councillors, with strong majorities.

Llanrumney councillors, John Reynolds and John Phillips, served as consecutive leaders of the Labour-controlled council in the late 1980s and early 1990s. Llanrumney councillor Heather Joyce became leader of the Cardiff Council between 2012 and 2014.

Llanrumney councillor, Keith Jones, was suspended from the Labour Party in 2022 and subsequently expelled from the party in May 2025, following an investigation into sexual harassment allegations. He continued to represent Llanrumney as an independent councillor.

== Election results ==
=== 1983 ===
1983 Cardiff City Council election
Party	Candidate	Votes	%	±%
Labour	M. B. Llewellyn ^{o}	1,901	44.8	N/A
Labour	John R. Phillips ^{o}	1,711		
Labour	John A. Reynolds ^{o}	1,646		
Alliance	Vita V. Jones	1,297	30.6	N/A
Conservative	E. R. McCarthy	1,041	24.6	N/A
Alliance	K. Tobin	1,028		
Conservative	S. Woods	1,028		
Alliance	E. Morgan	1,010		
Conservative	S. Brown	987		
Turnout			45.7	N/A
Registered electors		9,267		
Labour win (new seat)				
Labour win (new seat)				
Labour win (new seat)				

^{o} existing councillor, though because of boundary changes not for the same ward

=== 2022 ===
2022 Cardiff Council election
Party	Candidate	Votes	%	±%
Labour	Keith Phillip Jones*	1,267	62.3	
Labour	Heather Christine Joyce*	1,266	62.3	
Labour	Lee Edward Bridgeman*	1,238	60.9	
Conservative	Alan Hill	371	18.2	
Conservative	Kristopher David Roche	337	16.6	
Conservative	Mason Steed	332	16.3	
Common Ground	Jan Deem	218	10.7	
Propel	Charlene Manley	145	7.1	
Propel	Colin Lewis	139	6.8	
Liberal Democrats	John Speake	114	5.6	
Liberal Democrats	Laura Speake	114	5.6	
TUSC	Danielle Louise Smith	113	5.6	
Liberal Democrats	Wayne Street	89	4.4	
Turnout		2,033	25.0	

* = sitting councillor prior to the election

=== 2025 by-election ===
Councillor Heather Joyce resigned for health reasons in June 2025. She had represented Llanrumney for 17 years. Her resignation triggered a by-election on 24 July 2025. The ward was seen as an ideal target for a challenge to Labour from Reform UK. Reform announced their candidate would be Siddiq (Sidney) Mahmood Malik, founder of Hertfordshire-based ERA Film Studios. Labour retained the seat by 125 votes.

2025 Llanrumney by-election
Party	Candidate	Votes	%	±%
Labour	Lexi Joanna Pocknell	755	39.4	
Reform	Sidney Malik	630	32.9	
Liberal Democrats	Wayne Street	281	14.7	
Plaid Cymru	Joseph Oscar Gnagbo	138	7.2	
Conservative	Ffin Elliott	64	3.3	
Green	David Fitzpatrick	47	2.5	
Turnout				
