= Trowbridge (Cardiff electoral ward) =

- Electoral ward
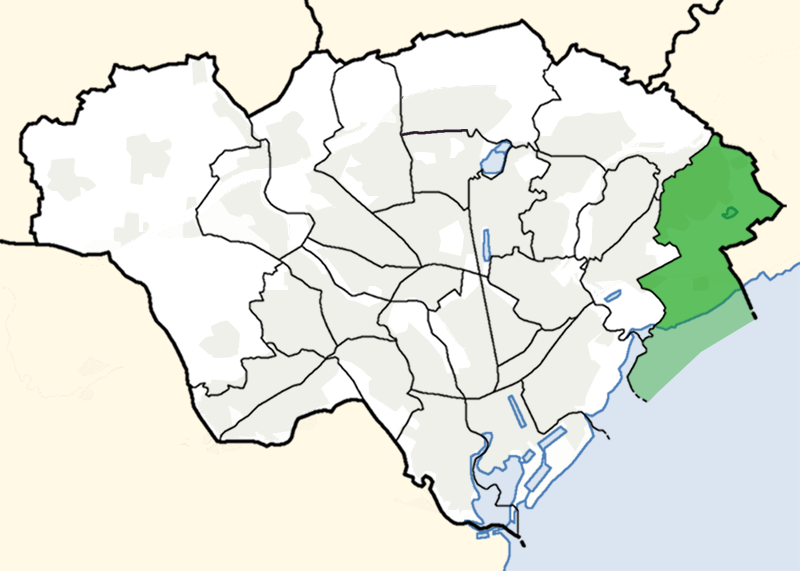
- Trowbridge ward location within Cardiff
- Population: 17,231 (2021 census)
- Community: Trowbridge
- Principal area: Cardiff
- Country: Wales
- Sovereign state: United Kingdom
- Post town: CARDIFF
- Postcode district: CF3
- Dialling code: +44-29
- UK Parliament: Cardiff East
- Senedd Cymru – Welsh Parliament: Cardiff South and Penarth
- Councillors: 3

Trowbridge is an electoral ward in the east of Cardiff, capital city of Wales. It covers the working class residential community of Trowbridge, which also includes the modern suburb of St Mellons. Created in 1983, the ward has elected mainly Labour Party councillors to the local Cardiff authority.

== Description ==
The Trowbridge ward is bordered to the west by the Rumney ward, to the east by the Newport ward of Tredegar Park and Marshfield, and to the south by the Bristol Channel. It includes the suburbs of Trowbridge and St Mellons, the Shirenewton caravan site and the hamlet of Newton.

It was created by The City of Cardiff (Electoral Arrangements) Order 1982 which came into effect from the May 1983 Cardiff City Council election.

== Representatives ==
From 1983 the Trowbridge ward elected two councillors to Cardiff City Council and (since 1996) to the County Council of the City and County of Cardiff. Representation increased to three councillors from the 1999 Cardiff Council election. Since 1983 the ward has consistently elected Labour Party councillors, with strong majorities, though elected a Liberal Democrat councillor in 2008.

The future Home Secretary and First Minister of Wales, Alun Michael, spent his early political career as a councillor for Trowbridge.

At a by-election in September 2025, Trowbridge elected Cardiff's first Reform UK councillor, Edward Topham.

== Election results ==
=== 1983 ===
Cardiff City Council election, 5 May 1983
Party	Candidate	Votes	%	±%
Labour	Alun Michael ^{o}	1,120		N/A
Labour	David English ^{o}	1,103		N/A
Conservative	A. McCabe	350		N/A
Turnout			17.5	N/A
Registered electors		8,408		
Labour win (new seat)				
Labour win (new seat)				

^{o} existing councillor, though because of boundary changes not for the same ward

=== 2022 ===
Cardiff Council election, 5 May 2022
Party	Candidate	Votes	%	±%
Labour	Bernie Bowen-Thomson*	1,545	52.5	N/A
Labour	Chris Lay*	1,470		N/A
Labour	Michael Michael*	1,398		N/A
Conservative	Catherine Elizabeth Dart	528	17.9	N/A
Conservative	Christopher Anthony Dart	480		N/A
Conservative	Geraint Hywel Payne	449		N/A
Common Ground	Jonathan Rhys Williams	367	12.5	N/A
Common Ground	Beca Evans	366		N/A
Common Ground	Martin Williams	278		N/A
Liberal Democrats	Chris Cogger	228	7.7	N/A
Propel	Leanne Lennox	197	6.7	N/A
Propel	Bernard Llewelyn Carleton	171		N/A
TUSC	Joanna Chojnicka	80	2.7	N/A
Turnout		2,684	22.8	−3.8
Registered electors		11,751		
Labour hold		Swing		
Labour hold		Swing		
Labour hold		Swing		

* = sitting councillor in this ward prior to election

=== 2025 by-election ===
Labour councillor Chris Lay stood down on 7 August 2025 after getting promotion in his job and moving to Telford, Shropshire. A by election was called for 18 September 2025, which was won comfortably by Reform UK, pushing Labour into third place. The new councillor, Edward Topham, was employed as a security guard at the Senedd in Cardiff Bay. The Senedd had confirmed Topham could keep his job if he won the by-election.

Trowbridge by-election: 18 September 2025
Party	Candidate	Votes	%	±%
Reform UK	Edward Topham	1,142	39.6	+39.6
Liberal Democrats	Chris Cogger	681	23.6	+15.9
Labour	Gary Bowen-Thomson	615	21.3	−31.2
Plaid Cymru	Carol Falcon	223	7.7	N/A
Conservative	Joe Roberts	90	3.1	−14.8
Green	Jessica Ryan	67	2.3	N/A
Propel	Leanne Lennox	63	2.2	−4.5
Majority		527		N/A
Turnout		2,881	24.7	+1.9
Registered electors		11,663		
Reform UK gain from Labour		Swing		
