= 2022 Cardiff Council election =

Local election in Wales

- 5 May 2022

All 79 (previously 75) seats to Cardiff Council 40 seats needed for a majority
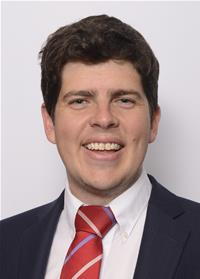

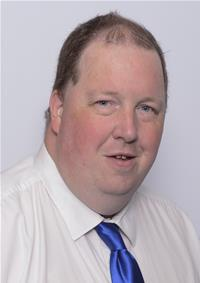

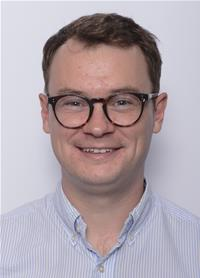

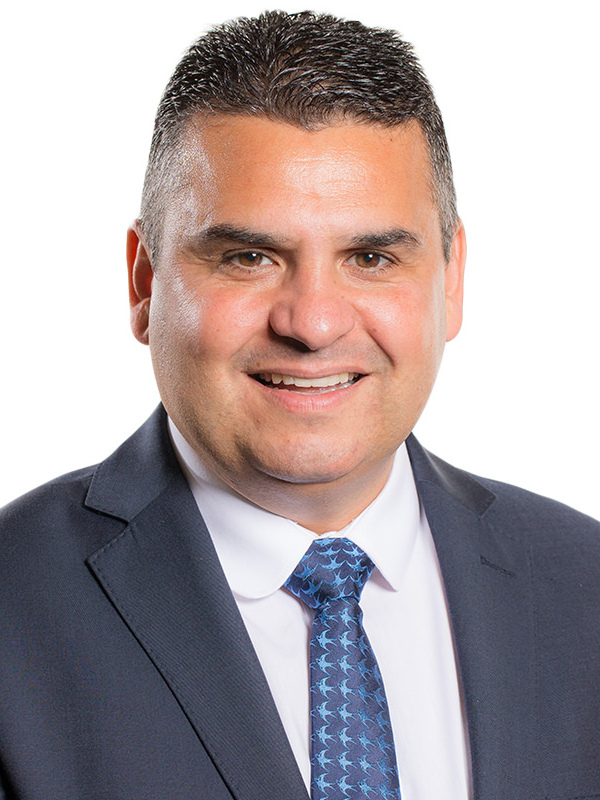
	First party	Second party	Third party
Leader	Huw Thomas	Adrian Robson	Rhys Taylor
Party	Labour	Conservative	Liberal Democrats
Leader's seat	Splott	Rhiwbina	Gabalfa
Last election	40	20	11
Seats before	39	21	11
Seats won	55	11	10
Seat change	▲15	▼9	▼1
	Fourth party	Fifth party
Leader		Neil McEvoy
Party	Common Ground	Propel
Leader's seat		Fairwater
Last election	New party	New party
Seats before	4	3
Seats won	2	1
Seat change	▲2	▲1
- Map showing the results of the 2022 Cardiff Council elections.
Council control before election
Labour
Council control after election
Labour

The 2022 Cardiff Council election took place on 5 May 2022 to elect 79 members to Cardiff Council. On the same day, elections were held to the other 21 local authorities and to community councils in Wales as part of the 2022 Welsh local elections.

The 2022 election had been postponed from 2021, and was contested under new ward boundaries, which also increased the number of seats from 75 to 79. The next election will take place in 2027, following an increase in the council term from four years to five years.

At the election, Labour maintained its overall control of the council, increasing its number of seats from 40 at the last election to 55. The Conservatives and Liberal Democrats lost ten seats and one seat respectively, to a total of 11 and 10, while Common Ground, an electoral pact between Plaid Cymru and Wales Green Party, won two seats. Propel won one seat.

== Background ==
=== Postponement ===
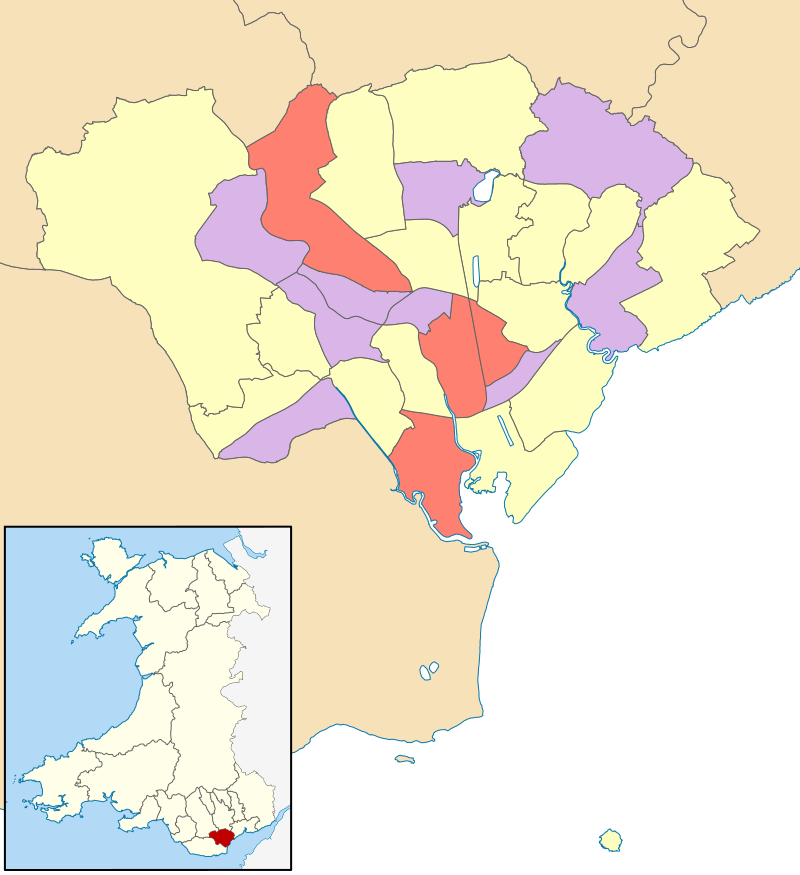
Map showing number of councillors per ward 2 councillors 3 councillors 4 councillors

Council elections in Wales were originally scheduled for May 2021, but were delayed to avoid a conflict with the 2021 Senedd election.

The length of council term was also increased from four years to five years to avoid future clashes, meaning that, after 2022, the next council election is expected in 2027.

=== Ward changes ===
The number of councillors increased from 75 to 79 at the 2022 election, with a number of ward changes.

In October 2021, Cardiff Council accepted a number of ward change proposals for the next election made by the Local Democracy and Boundary Commission for Wales, with only slight modification. The changes gave a better parity of representation. Twenty-one wards remained unchanged. Of the other wards:

- Butetown increased from one to three councillors.
- Creigiau/St Fagans merged with the Pentyrch ward and was renamed "Pentyrch and St Fagans", with a total increase in councillors from two to three.
- Grangetown increased from three to four councillors.
- Lisvane was renamed "Lisvane and Thornhill", with the addition of Thornhill from the neighbouring Llanishen ward, and increased from one to three councillors.
- Llanishen decreased from four to two councillors following the transfer of Thornhill to Lisvane.
- Pentwyn decreased from four to three councillors.
- Pontprennau/Old St Mellons was renamed "Pontprennau and Old St Mellons".
- Radyr increased from one to two councillors.

=== Council term and campaign ===
The Labour group have been in control of Cardiff Council since 2012.

In 2019, three by-elections (Ely, February 2019; Cyncoed, July 2019; and Whitchurch & Tongwynlais, October 2019) were called following the deaths of the sitting councillors. Plaid Cymru gained the Ely seat from Labour, while the Liberal Democrats and Conservatives held their seats in the other by-elections.

In March 2018, Cllr Neil McEvoy was expelled from Plaid Cymru after allegedly disruptive behaviour at the party's 2017 spring conference. Following the controversy, in October 2019, the three remaining Plaid Cymru councillors resigned their whips, and formed an independent group with McEvoy. McEvoy and Cllrs Keith Parry and Lisa Ford would later join McEvoy's new party Propel, while Cllr Andrea Gibson, who won the Ely by-election, was elected for Common Ground in Pentyrch and St Fagans at the 2022 election.

In November 2019, the Conservatives gained a seat in Llanishen following a by-election triggered by the resignation of the sitting Labour councillor. In November 2021, Labour won a by-election in Heath following the resignation of an independent councillor.

The Welsh Cladiators, a residents group campaigning against fire defective buildings, hoped to stand in the Butetown ward, but ultimately did not.

=== Common Ground Alliance ===
Common Ground Alliance
- Founded: September 2021
- Merger of: Plaid Cymru (Cardiff); Wales Green Party (Cardiff)
- Cardiff Council: 2 / 79

In September 2021, Plaid Cymru and the Green Party announced an electoral pact which would see them fielding a joint slate of candidates in Cardiff. Neither party had sitting councillors: Plaid Cymru's councillors elected in 2017 had been either expelled or had quit the party. In the election, the two parties fielded a common slate of candidates, known as the Common Ground Alliance. Of the 70 Common Ground Alliance candidates, 46 were from Plaid Cymru with the remaining 24 from the Green Party. The alliance's campaign was formally launched on 24 April 2022.

In the election, Common Ground won 17% of votes across the city, coming third behind Labour and the Conservatives. They won two seats, both in the Pentyrch and St Fagans ward, while the Liberal Democrats returned 10 councillors on a smaller share of the vote.

The Alliance's elected councillors are Andrea Gibson and Rhys Owain Livesy.

== Candidates by party ==
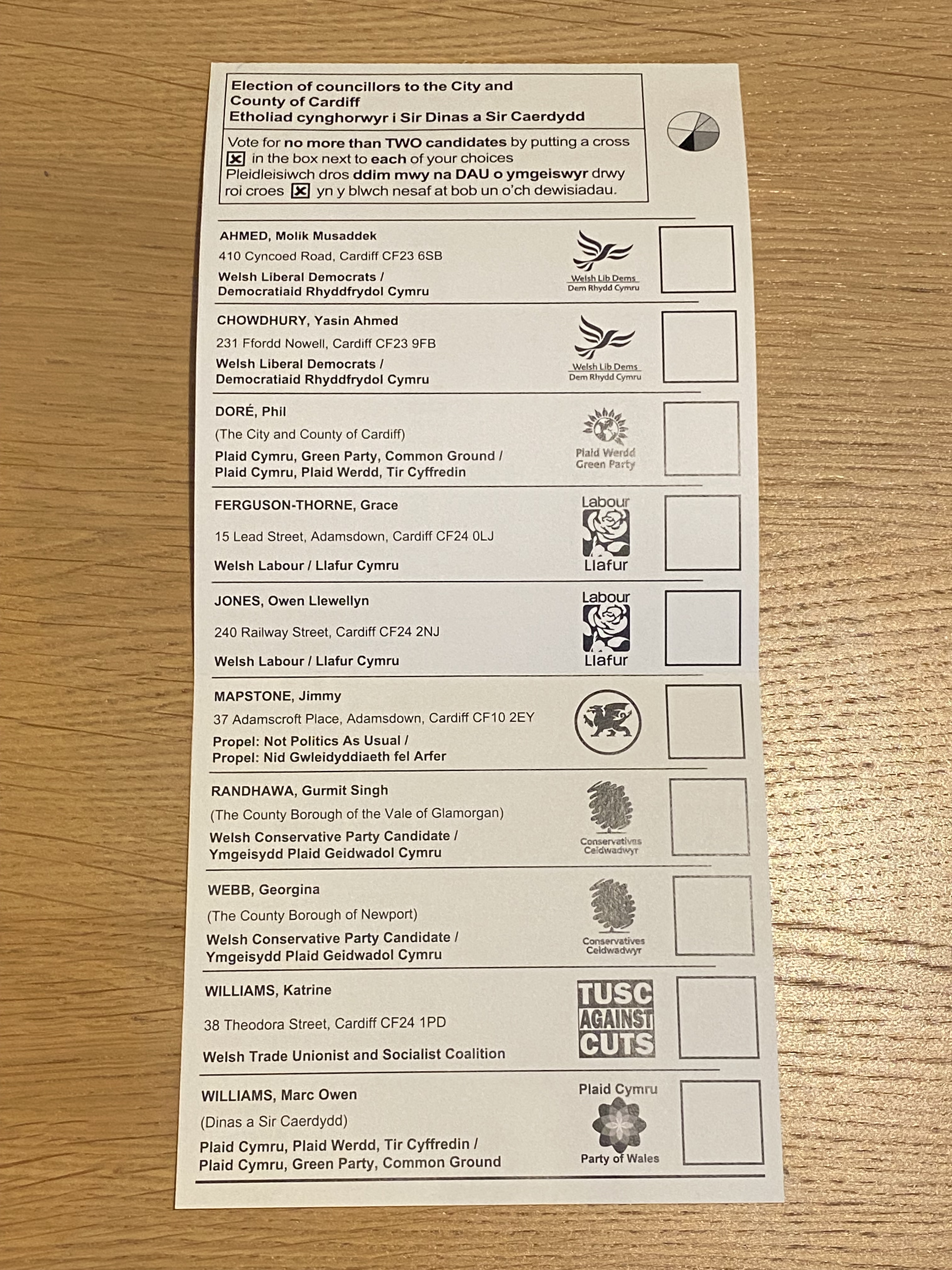
Example of a Cardiff Council ballot paper May 2022.

A total of 358 candidates stood for the 79 seats on the council, an average of 4.5 candidates per seat. Eleven parties or alliances stood candidates, plus two independent candidates.

Both the Labour and the Conservatives stood the full 79 candidates. The Common Ground Alliance and the Liberal Democrats stood in all 28 wards, while Propel stood in 21 wards (75%) and the Trade Union and Socialist Coalition stood in 15 wards (54%).

Party	Number of candidates	Number of wards
Conservative	79	28
Labour	79	28
Common Ground Alliance (Plaid Cymru and Wales Green Party)	70	28
Liberal Democrats	67	28
Propel	38	21
TUSC	15	15
Sovereign	4	4
Independent	2	1
Communist	1	1
Freedom Alliance	1	1
Volt	1	1
Women's Equality	1	1
Total	358 / 79	28

== Overview of results ==
2022 Cardiff Council election (Note: Votes in this table are the total for the top candidate for each party in each ward. Votes % is calculated as the votes for the party divided by the total votes in this table (110,003). Vote change is compared with the same calculations for 2017.)
Party	Seats	Gains	Losses	Net gain/loss	Seats %	Votes %	Votes	+/−
Labour	55	16	0	▲16	69.6	44.8	49,155	▲9.6
Conservative	11	0	10	▼10	13.9	19.1	21,024	▼6.4
Liberal Democrats	10	1	2	▼1	12.7	13.4	14,710	▼0.9
Common Ground	2	2	4 (Note: Common Ground Alliance figures compared with combined previous Plaid Cymru and Green Party performance.)	▼2	2.5	17.3	19,008	▼2.5
Propel	1	1	0	▲1	1.3	3.3	3,618	N/A
TUSC	0	0	0	Steady	0.0	1.1	1,167	▲0.6
Independent	0	0	0	Steady	0.0	0.7	729	▼2.9
Sovereign	0	0	0	Steady	0.0	0.1	135	N/A
Women's Equality	0	0	0	Steady	0.0	0.1	135	N/A
Volt	0	0	0	Steady	0.0	0.1	131	N/A
Communist	0	0	0	Steady	0.0	0.1	126	N/A
Freedom Alliance	0	0	0	Steady	0.0	0.1	65	N/A

== Ward results ==
* = sitting councillor in this ward prior to election

=== Adamsdown (2 seats) ===
Adamsdown
Party	Candidate	Votes	%	±%
Labour	Owen Llewellyn Jones*	1,260	61.5	N/A
Labour	Grace Ferguson-Thorne	1,250	61.0	N/A
Liberal Democrats	Molik Musaddek Ahmed	368	18.0	N/A
Liberal Democrats	Yasin Ahmed Chowdhury	364	17.8	N/A
Common Ground	Phil Doré	226	11.0	N/A
Common Ground	Marc Owen Williams	200	9.8	N/A
Conservative	Georgina Webb	110	5.4	N/A
Conservative	Gurmit Singh Randhawa	106	5.2	N/A
Propel	Jimmy Mapstone	59	2.9	N/A
TUSC	Katrine Williams	41	2.0	N/A
Turnout		2,049	32.2	−3.9
Registered electors		6,364		
Labour gain from Liberal Democrats		Swing		
Labour hold		Swing		

=== Butetown (3 seats) ===
Butetown
Party	Candidate	Votes	%	±%
Labour	Saeed Ebrahim*	1,502	58.5	N/A
Labour	Helen Gunter	1,364	53.2	N/A
Labour	Margaret Lewis	1,184	46.1	N/A
Common Ground	Lewis Beecham	649	25.3	N/A
Common Ground	Katie Greenaway	500	19.5	N/A
Common Ground	Helen Rose Westhead	477	18.6	N/A
Liberal Democrats	Sam Cooke	296	11.5	N/A
Conservative	Dan French	273	10.6	N/A
Conservative	Declan Aaron Edwards	272	10.6	N/A
Conservative	Howard Wilkins	237	9.2	N/A
Liberal Democrats	Marshall Tisdale	181	7.1	N/A
Liberal Democrats	Majid Karim	168	6.5	N/A
Propel	Diane McEvoy	63	2.5	N/A
Turnout		2,566	30.2	−4.7
Registered electors		8,501		
Labour hold		Swing		
Labour win (new seat)				
Labour win (new seat)				

=== Caerau (2 seats) ===
Caerau
Party	Candidate	Votes	%	±%
Labour	Peter Bradbury*	1,608	74.1	N/A
Labour	Elaine Simmons*	1,309	60.3	N/A
Conservative	Dave Medlam	272	12.5	N/A
Conservative	Rob Sutton	256	11.8	N/A
Common Ground	Emyr Gruffydd	212	9.8	N/A
Propel	Brendan Curran	123	5.7	N/A
Propel	Peter Crumb	106	4.9	N/A
Liberal Democrats	Michael Joseph Boyle	102	4.7	N/A
TUSC	Dave Reid	15	0.7	N/A
Turnout		2,170	26.9	−6.5
Registered electors		8,090		
Labour hold		Swing		
Labour hold		Swing		

=== Canton (3 seats) ===
Canton
Party	Candidate	Votes	%	±%
Labour	Stephen Cunnah*	2,761	47.8	N/A
Labour	Susan Elsmore*	2,629	45.5	N/A
Labour	Jasmin Chowdhury	2,460	42.5	N/A
Common Ground	Eleri Lewis	2,408	41.6	N/A
Common Ground	John ap Steffan	2,356	40.7	N/A
Common Ground	Matthew Hawkins	2,033	35.2	N/A
Conservative	Jonathon Segarty	485	8.4	N/A
Conservative	Bhupendra Pathak	440	7.6	N/A
Conservative	Muhammad Raz	414	7.2	N/A
Liberal Democrats	Henry George Mayall	205	3.5	N/A
Liberal Democrats	Ian John Newton	170	2.9	N/A
Propel	Osman Marks	132	2.3	N/A
Propel	Lucy Sarah Stayt	111	1.9	N/A
Propel	John Gabb	97	1.7	N/A
TUSC	Taryn Tarrant-Cornish	76	1.3	N/A
Turnout		5,782	47.2	−4.1
Registered electors		12,259		
Labour hold		Swing		
Labour hold		Swing		
Labour hold		Swing		

=== Cathays (4 seats) ===
Cathays
Party	Candidate	Votes	%	±%
Labour	Ali Ahmed*	1,940	54.6	N/A
Labour	Sarah Merry*	1,876	52.8	N/A
Labour	Norma Mackie*	1,798	50.6	N/A
Labour	Chris Weaver*	1,607	45.3	N/A
Common Ground	Ceri John Davies	871	24.5	N/A
Common Ground	Attah Essien	676	19.0	N/A
Common Ground	Lowri Tudur	609	17.2	N/A
Common Ground	Deio Sion Llewelyn Owen	590	16.6	N/A
Liberal Democrats	James Bear	480	13.5	N/A
Liberal Democrats	Jonathan Bird	447	12.6	N/A
Independent	Paulus Thurlbeck	392	11.0	N/A
Independent	Dougie Gentles	337	9.5	N/A
Liberal Democrats	Hugh Minor	298	8.4	N/A
Liberal Democrats	Deborah Stux	295	8.3	N/A
Conservative	Daniel Martin Burton	246	6.9	N/A
Conservative	Aled John Jones-Pritchard	222	6.3	N/A
Conservative	Janine Jones-Pritchard	216	6.1	N/A
Conservative	Richard Mackay-Stewart	205	5.8	N/A
TUSC	George Phillips	139	3.9	N/A
Communist	Noah Russell	126	3.5	N/A
Turnout		3,550	26.8	−1.3
Registered electors		13,256		
Labour hold		Swing		
Labour hold		Swing		
Labour hold		Swing		
Labour hold		Swing		

=== Cyncoed (3 seats) ===
Cyncoed
Party	Candidate	Votes	%	±%
Liberal Democrats	Robert James Hopkins*	2,317	54.4	N/A
Liberal Democrats	Bablin Molik*	2,316	54.4	N/A
Liberal Democrats	Daniel Edward Waldron	2,131	50.1	N/A
Labour	Madhu Khanna-Davies	908	21.3	N/A
Labour	Ian Bounds	900	21.1	N/A
Labour	George Baldwin	858	20.2	N/A
Conservative	Jasmin Cogin	737	17.3	N/A
Conservative	Edward Sumner	711	16.7	N/A
Conservative	Jack Goodwin	692	16.3	N/A
Common Ground	James Peter Kenneth Meiklejohn	278	6.5	N/A
Common Ground	Siân Wyn	263	6.2	N/A
Common Ground	Maralyn Joy Davies	255	6.0	N/A
Propel	Tim Dill-Peterson	85	2.0	N/A
Turnout		4,257	49.2	−7.1
Registered electors		8,651		
Liberal Democrats hold		Swing		
Liberal Democrats gain from Conservative		Swing		
Liberal Democrats hold		Swing		

=== Ely (3 seats) ===
Ely
Party	Candidate	Votes	%	±%
Labour	Russell Vivian Goodway*	1,418	61.1	N/A
Labour	Irene May Humphreys	1,369	59.0	N/A
Labour	Kaaba Maliika	1,266	54.5	N/A
Conservative	Michelle Michaelis	321	13.8	N/A
Propel	Ceri McEvoy	312	13.4	N/A
Conservative	George Michael Welsh	300	12.9	N/A
Conservative	Waseem Qazi	288	12.4	N/A
Common Ground	Shaun Hew Phillips	279	12.0	N/A
Propel	Jamie Pugh	273	11.8	N/A
Common Ground	David Peter Griffin	233	10.0	N/A
Propel	Ellie Kamanda	204	8.8	N/A
Liberal Democrats	Clive John Mann	116	5.0	N/A
TUSC	Ross Saunders	66	2.8	N/A
Turnout		2,322	23.4	−6.1
Registered electors		9,934		
Labour hold		Swing		
Labour hold		Swing		
Labour gain from Plaid Cymru		Swing		

=== Fairwater (3 seats) ===
Sitting councillors, McEvoy, Ford and Parry, were elected for Plaid Cymru at the 2017 election. McEvoy was expelled, Ford and Parry later resigned and sat as Independents. McEvoy later founded a new party, Propel.

In this election Labour gained two seats from Plaid Cymru, and McEvoy retained his seat representing a gain for Propel from Plaid Cymru.

Fairwater
Party	Candidate	Votes	%	±%
Labour	Claudia Boes	1,543	40.7	N/A
Propel	Neil McEvoy*	1,478	39.0	N/A
Labour	Saleh Ahmed	1,455	38.4	N/A
Propel	Lisa Ford*	1,318	34.8	N/A
Labour	Lorna Stabler	1,300	34.3	N/A
Propel	Keith Parry*	1,185	31.3	N/A
Common Ground	Neil Roberts	436	11.5	N/A
Conservative	David Adams	417	11.0	N/A
Common Ground	Philip Christopher Croxall	383	10.1	N/A
Conservative	Natalie Matthews	383	10.1	N/A
Common Ground	Erik Williams	344	9.1	N/A
Conservative	Clive Williams	343	9.0	N/A
Liberal Democrats	Eleri Kathryn Kibale	150	4.0	N/A
Liberal Democrats	Mark Andrew Rees	126	3.3	N/A
Turnout		3,791	38.2	−6.3
Registered electors		9,919		
Labour gain from Plaid Cymru		Swing	38.2	
Propel gain from Plaid Cymru		Swing		
Labour gain from Plaid Cymru		Swing		

=== Gabalfa (2 seats) ===
S

Gabalfa
Party	Candidate	Votes	%	±%
Liberal Democrats	Rhys Taylor*	1,082	49.7	N/A
Liberal Democrats	Ashley Kalum Wood*	967	44.4	N/A
Labour	Claire O'Shea	821	37.7	N/A
Labour	Leo Holmes	719	33.0	N/A
Common Ground	Sam Coates	302	13.9	N/A
Women's Equality	Bethan Louise Fry	135	6.2	N/A
Conservative	Margaret Fegan	97	4.5	N/A
Conservative	David Stewart Gow	91	4.2	N/A
TUSC	Michael Charles Frazier	41	1.9	N/A
Turnout		2,179	37.9	+2.2
Registered electors		5,752		
Liberal Democrats hold		Swing		
Liberal Democrats hold		Swing		

=== Grangetown (4 seats) ===
Grangetown
Party	Candidate	Votes	%	±%
Labour	Ash Lister*	2,885	56.4	N/A
Labour	Sara Elisabeth Robinson	2,733	53.4	N/A
Labour	Abdul Sattar*	2,665	52.1	N/A
Labour	Lynda Doreen Thorne*	2,533	49.5	N/A
Common Ground	Tariq Awan	1,511	29.5	N/A
Common Ground	Sarah King	1,382	27.0	N/A
Common Ground	Luke Nicholas	1,312	25.7	N/A
Common Ground	Frankie-Rose Taylor	1,131	22.1	N/A
Conservative	Joseph Anyaike	487	9.5	N/A
Conservative	Conor Holohan	478	9.3	N/A
Conservative	Llyr Tomos Powell	442	8.6	N/A
Conservative	Vivienne Ward	425	8.3	N/A
Liberal Democrats	David Paul Morgan	266	5.2	N/A
Liberal Democrats	Irfan Latif	258	5.0	N/A
Liberal Democrats	Aamir Sheikh	250	4.9	N/A
Propel	Jonathan Paul Gee	175	3.4	N/A
Propel	Sailesh Patel	162	3.2	N/A
Propel	Michael James Voyce	150	2.9	N/A
TUSC	Joe Fathallah	109	2.1	N/A
Turnout		5,115	35.8	−1.5
Registered electors		14,304		
Labour hold		Swing		
Labour hold		Swing		
Labour hold		Swing		
Labour win (new seat)				

=== Heath (3 seats) ===
Sitting councillor, Julie Sangani, had been elected at a by-election in November 2021, following the retirement of long standing Independent councillor Fenella Bowden.

Heath
Party	Candidate	Votes	%	±%
Labour	Graham Hinchey*	2,584	50.9	N/A
Labour	Julie Sangani*	2,581	50.8	N/A
Labour	Mike Ash-Edwards	2,364	46.5	N/A
Conservative	Lyn Hudson*	1,283	25.3	N/A
Conservative	Peter Hudson	1,149	22.6	N/A
Liberal Democrats	Stephen Hill	1,086	21.4	N/A
Conservative	Heather Ward	989	19.5	N/A
Liberal Democrats	Kathryn Lock	752	14.8	N/A
Liberal Democrats	Alun Williams	725	14.3	N/A
Common Ground	Gwennol Haf	520	10.2	N/A
Common Ground	Catherine Jane Lewis	460	9.1	N/A
Turnout		5,079	51.6	−3.5
Registered electors		9,848		
Labour hold		Swing		
Labour hold		Swing		
Labour gain from Conservative		Swing		

=== Lisvane and Thornhill (3 seats) ===
Candidates John Lancaster and Sian-Elin Melbourne were councillors for the Llanishen ward prior to this election.

Lisvane and Thornhill
Party	Candidate	Votes	%	±%
Conservative	John Lancaster*	2,050	45.7	N/A
Conservative	Sian-Elin Melbourne*	2,014	44.9	N/A
Conservative	Emma Reid-Jones	2,006	44.7	N/A
Labour	David Chinnick	1,949	43.4	N/A
Labour	Georgina Ann Phillips	1,676	37.3	N/A
Labour	Spencer Pearson	1,559	34.7	N/A
Common Ground	Jonathan Mark Draper	447	10.0	N/A
Common Ground	Gwynfor Davies	418	9.3	N/A
Liberal Democrats	Claire Louise Halliwell	385	8.6	N/A
Liberal Democrats	Robert Corry Woodward	315	7.0	N/A
Turnout		4,490	50.8	N/A
Registered electors		8,838		
Conservative hold		Swing		
Conservative win (new seat)				
Conservative win (new seat)				

=== Llandaff (2 seats) ===
Llandaff
Party	Candidate	Votes	%	±%
Conservative	Sean Driscoll*	1,422	37.0	N/A
Labour	Peter Huw Jenkins	1,279	33.2	N/A
Conservative	Matt Smith	1,140	29.6	N/A
Common Ground	Judith Allan	1,109	28.8	N/A
Labour	Laura Rochefort	1,075	27.9	N/A
Common Ground	Steffan Webb	927	24.1	N/A
Liberal Democrats	Ann Margaret Hyde	201	5.2	N/A
Liberal Democrats	Keith Charles Hyde	134	3.5	N/A
Propel	Mal McEvoy	86	2.2	N/A
Propel	Charlotte Dommett	63	1.6	N/A
Sovereign Party	Gruffydd Meredith	18	0.5	N/A
Turnout		3,847	54.6	−1.0
Registered electors		7,045		
Conservative hold		Swing		
Labour gain from Conservative		Swing		

=== Llandaff North (2 seats) ===
Llandaff North
Party	Candidate	Votes	%	±%
Labour	Jennifer Burke-Davies*	1,493	59.2	N/A
Labour	Dilwar Ali*	1,365	54.1	N/A
Common Ground	Paul Rock	581	23.0	N/A
Common Ground	Gill Griffin	515	20.4	N/A
Conservative	Craig Teale-Jones	261	10.3	N/A
Conservative	Felix Milbank	258	10.2	N/A
Liberal Democrats	Elinor Claire Dixon	115	4.6	N/A
Propel	Kevin Hayde	105	4.2	N/A
Propel	Janet Hayde	97	3.8	N/A
Liberal Democrats	Matthew Thomas Dixon	82	3.3	N/A
TUSC	Helen Perriam	27	1.1	N/A
Turnout		2,522	41.7	−2.2
Registered electors		6,047		
Labour hold		Swing		
Labour hold		Swing		

=== Llanishen (2 seats) ===
Boundary changes resulted in the community of Thornhill being moved out of the ward at this election (merging with Lisvane to form the new Lisvane and Thornhill ward). Prior to the election all seats were held by Conservative councillors.

Llanishen
Party	Candidate	Votes	%	±%
Labour	Garry Hunt	1,892	54.5	N/A
Labour	Bethan Eluned Proctor	1,777	51.2	N/A
Conservative	Jens Mario Kaiser	872	25.1	N/A
Conservative	Lawrence Douglas Gwynn	861	24.8	N/A
Common Ground	Betsan Angell	401	11.6	N/A
Common Ground	Michael David Cope	333	9.6	N/A
Liberal Democrats	Mary Rose Naughton	275	7.9	N/A
Liberal Democrats	Peter Frederick Randerson	197	5.7	N/A
Propel	Andrew John Edwards	63	1.8	N/A
Turnout		3,470	43.1	N/A
Registered electors		8,056		
Labour gain from Conservative		Swing		
Labour gain from Conservative		Swing		

=== Llanrumney (3 seats) ===
Llanrumney
Party	Candidate	Votes	%	±%
Labour	Keith Phillip Jones*	1,267	62.3	N/A
Labour	Heather Christine Joyce*	1,266	62.3	N/A
Labour	Lee Edward Bridgeman*	1,238	60.9	N/A
Conservative	Alan Hill	371	18.2	N/A
Conservative	Kristopher David Roche	337	16.6	N/A
Conservative	Mason Steed	332	16.3	N/A
Common Ground	Jan Deem	218	10.7	N/A
Propel	Charlene Manley	145	7.1	N/A
Propel	Colin Lewis	139	6.8	N/A
Liberal Democrats	John Speake	114	5.6	N/A
Liberal Democrats	Laura Speake	114	5.6	N/A
TUSC	Danielle Louise Smith	113	5.6	N/A
Liberal Democrats	Wayne Street	89	4.4	N/A
Turnout		2,033	25.0	−4.2
Registered electors		8,119		
Labour hold		Swing		
Labour hold		Swing		
Labour hold		Swing		

=== Pentwyn (3 seats) ===
Pentwyn
Party	Candidate	Votes	%	±%
Liberal Democrats	Joe Carter*	1,802	46.5	N/A
Labour	Jess Moultrie	1,632	42.1	N/A
Liberal Democrats	Dan Naughton*	1,562	40.3	N/A
Labour	Hannah McCarthy	1,549	39.9	N/A
Liberal Democrats	Emma Sandrey*	1,516	39.1	N/A
Labour	Simon Woolston	1,500	38.7	N/A
Conservative	Michael Stewart Bryan	327	8.4	N/A
Conservative	Munawar Ahmed Mughal	320	8.2	N/A
Conservative	Joseph Thomas Kidd	305	7.9	N/A
Common Ground	Paul Morgan	203	5.2	N/A
Common Ground	Eluned Marion Press	160	4.1	N/A
Common Ground	Elliot Stitfall	144	3.7	N/A
Propel	Dean Febbo	44	1.1	N/A
TUSC	Catherine Anne Peace	36	0.9	N/A
Sovereign Party	Darren Bryant	31	0.8	N/A
Turnout		3,879	34.7	−2.9
Registered electors		11,167		
Liberal Democrats hold		Swing		
Labour hold		Swing		
Liberal Democrats hold		Swing		

=== Pentyrch and St Fagans (3 seats) ===
Common Ground candidate Andrea Gibson was elected as a Plaid Cymru councillor for Ely in a by-election in February 2019. Gibson left Plaid Cymru in October 2019 and later sat as an independent.

This ward was formed by a merger of Pentyrch and Creigiau/St Fagans, which both elected one Conservative councillor each in 2017. In this election, Pentyrch and St Fagans elected three councillors (a net increase of one).

Pentyrch and St Fagans
Party	Candidate	Votes	%	±%
Common Ground	Andrea Gibson	1,289	34.2	N/A
Common Ground	Rhys Owain Livesy	1,241	32.9	N/A
Conservative	Catriona Brown-Reckless	1,170	31.0	N/A
Conservative	Gary Dixon	1,093	29.0	N/A
Common Ground	John Rowlands	1,090	28.9	N/A
Conservative	Jena Quilter	1,032	27.4	N/A
Labour	Shane Peter Andrew	1,020	27.1	N/A
Labour	John Yarrow	944	25.0	N/A
Labour	Lexi Joanna Gauci	922	24.5	N/A
Liberal Democrats	Caroline Morris	266	7.1	N/A
Liberal Democrats	David Rees	198	5.3	N/A
Liberal Democrats	Trisha Rees	177	4.7	N/A
Volt	David Frank Davies	131	3.5	N/A
Propel	Claire Venables	78	2.1	N/A
Propel	Gareth Dommett	69	1.8	N/A
Propel	Andrew Pugh	56	1.5	N/A
Turnout		3,770	46.5	N/A
Registered electors		8,104		
Common Ground win (new seat)				
Common Ground gain from Conservative		Swing		
Conservative hold		Swing		

=== Penylan (3 seats) ===
Penylan
Party	Candidate	Votes	%	±%
Liberal Democrats	Rodney Berman*	2,376	50.8	N/A
Liberal Democrats	Imran Latif	2,053	43.9	N/A
Liberal Democrats	Jon Shimmin	1,986	42.4	N/A
Labour	Elin Bold	1,748	37.4	N/A
Labour	Emlyn James Pratt	1,460	31.2	N/A
Labour	Jonathan Mark Wilson	1,381	29.5	N/A
Common Ground	Nick Carter	579	12.4	N/A
Common Ground	Dewi John	542	11.6	N/A
Conservative	Harry Jones	480	10.3	N/A
Conservative	Tomos John Povey	432	9.2	N/A
Conservative	Frank Smith	423	9.0	N/A
Propel	Marc Phillips	76	1.6	N/A
Turnout		4,679	46.7	−3.4
Registered electors		10,014		
Liberal Democrats hold		Swing		
Liberal Democrats hold		Swing		
Liberal Democrats hold		Swing		

=== Plasnewydd (4 seats) ===
Plasnewydd
Party	Candidate	Votes	%	±%
Labour	Daniel De'Ath*	3,055	66.1	N/A
Labour	Sue Lent*	2,679	57.9	N/A
Labour	Mary McGarry*	2,675	57.8	N/A
Labour	Pete Wong*	2,651	57.3	N/A
Common Ground	Adam James Layzell	905	19.6	N/A
Common Ground	Owen Benedict Ruari McArdle	766	16.6	N/A
Liberal Democrats	Clare James	724	15.7	N/A
Common Ground	Morgan Meurig Rogers	676	14.6	N/A
Common Ground	Ned Parish	640	13.8	N/A
Liberal Democrats	Richard Anthony Jerrett	609	13.2	N/A
Liberal Democrats	Geraldine Nichols	587	12.7	N/A
Liberal Democrats	Phil Jones	531	11.5	N/A
Conservative	Luke Doherty	233	5.0	N/A
Conservative	Nigel Richards	202	4.4	N/A
Conservative	James McClean	184	4.0	N/A
Conservative	Zach Stubbings	177	3.8	N/A
TUSC	John Aaron Williams	172	3.7	N/A
Sovereign Party	Justin Lilley	57	1.2	N/A
Turnout		4,625	35.5	−3.4
Registered electors		13,016		
Labour hold		Swing		
Labour hold		Swing		
Labour hold		Swing		
Labour hold		Swing		

=== Pontprennau and Old St Mellons (2 seats) ===
Pontprennau and Old St Mellons
Party	Candidate	Votes	%	±%
Conservative	Joel Williams*	1,595	46.9	N/A
Conservative	Peter Littlechild	1,343	39.5	N/A
Labour	Nicola Savage	1,297	38.1	N/A
Labour	Khuram Chowdhry	1,201	35.3	N/A
Common Ground	Steve George	267	7.9	N/A
Common Ground	Ceri Hughes	248	7.3	N/A
Liberal Democrats	Sarah Elizabeth Mackerras	218	6.4	N/A
Liberal Democrats	Nigel Mackerras	186	5.5	N/A
Freedom Alliance	Teresa Browning	65	1.9	N/A
Turnout		3,400	37.9	−6.6
Registered electors		8,966		
Conservative hold		Swing		
Conservative hold		Swing		

=== Radyr (2 seats) ===
Radyr
Party	Candidate	Votes	%	±%
Conservative	Calum Tudur James Davies	988	33.2	N/A
Labour	Helen Margaret Lloyd Jones	968	32.5	N/A
Labour	Tyrone Davies	942	31.7	N/A
Conservative	Chris Harries	912	30.7	N/A
Common Ground	Michael Deem	818	27.5	N/A
Common Ground	Radha Nair-Roberts	796	26.8	N/A
Liberal Democrats	Annabelle Rees	133	4.5	N/A
Liberal Democrats	Matthew Peter Morgan	113	3.8	N/A
Propel	Craig Ollerton	40	1.3	N/A
Propel	Steve West	35	1.2	N/A
Turnout		2,974	52.3	−1.1
Registered electors		5,689		
Conservative hold		Swing		
Labour win (new seat)				

=== Rhiwbina (3 seats) ===
Rhiwbina
Party	Candidate	Votes	%	±%
Conservative	Jayne Louise Cowan*	2,789	51.3	N/A
Conservative	Adrian Robson*	2,430	44.7	N/A
Conservative	Oliver William Owen*	2,332	42.9	N/A
Labour	Bev Hampson	2,274	41.9	N/A
Labour	Morgan Fackrell	1,881	34.6	N/A
Labour	Christopher James Walburn	1,678	30.9	N/A
Common Ground	Cenric Clement-Evans	593	10.9	N/A
Common Ground	Alice Bethan Macintosh	574	10.6	N/A
Common Ground	Rhys Llewellyn Williams	551	10.1	N/A
Liberal Democrats	Anne Morgan	328	6.0	N/A
Liberal Democrats	Jonathan Land	290	5.3	N/A
Turnout		5,432	57.5	−4.4
Registered electors		9,440		
Conservative hold		Swing		
Conservative hold		Swing		
Conservative hold		Swing		

=== Riverside (3 seats) ===
Riverside
Party	Candidate	Votes	%	±%
Labour	Leonora Hope Thomson	2,453	57.6	N/A
Labour	Caro Wild*	2,391	56.1	N/A
Labour	Kanaya Singh	2,386	56.0	N/A
Common Ground	Sioned James	1,064	25.0	N/A
Common Ground	Rachel Susan Roberts	861	20.2	N/A
Common Ground	Ken Barker	840	19.7	N/A
Conservative	Terry Brooks	318	7.5	N/A
Conservative	Ron Michaelis	304	7.1	N/A
Conservative	Kola Ponnle	273	6.4	N/A
Liberal Democrats	Rosemary Chaloner	266	6.2	N/A
Liberal Democrats	Alun Williams	246	5.8	N/A
Liberal Democrats	Mahmood Hassan	214	5.0	N/A
Propel	Amir Alsisi	155	3.6	N/A
Propel	Amira Alsisi	128	3.0	N/A
Propel	Philip Fotiatis	97	2.3	N/A
TUSC	Lianne Francis	94	2.2	N/A
Sovereign Party	Darrin Lee Hughes	29	0.7	N/A
Turnout		4,261	41.4	−3.2
Registered electors		10,286		
Labour hold		Swing		
Labour hold		Swing		
Labour hold		Swing		

=== Rumney (2 seats) ===
Rumney
Party	Candidate	Votes	%	±%
Labour	Bob Derbyshire*	1,105	53.2	N/A
Labour	Jackie Parry*	1,080	51.9	N/A
Conservative	Gareth Llewellyn Lloyd	671	32.3	N/A
Conservative	Rhydian Thomas Payne	608	29.2	N/A
Common Ground	David Fitzpatrick	213	10.2	N/A
Liberal Democrats	Asghar Ali	161	7.7	N/A
Propel	Roy Colley	65	3.1	N/A
TUSC	Rhys Hywel Davies	53	2.5	N/A
Turnout		2,079	30.7	−2.8
Registered electors		6,763		
Labour hold		Swing		
Labour hold		Swing		

=== Splott (3 seats) ===
Splott
Party	Candidate	Votes	%	±%
Labour	Jane Henshaw	2,079	69.6	N/A
Labour	Huw Thomas*	2,058	68.9	N/A
Labour	Ed Stubbs*	1,984	66.4	N/A
Common Ground	Pip Beattie	437	14.6	N/A
Common Ground	Tom Coates	342	11.4	N/A
Common Ground	Alex Jamieson	287	9.6	N/A
Conservative	Thomas Harry James	280	9.4	N/A
Conservative	Christopher Kirkham	262	8.8	N/A
Conservative	Bob Lawrence	256	8.6	N/A
Liberal Democrats	Malcolm Evans	173	5.8	N/A
Liberal Democrats	Gary Van Der Walt	141	4.7	N/A
Propel	Anthony Eedy	137	4.6	N/A
TUSC	Dave Bartlett	87	2.9	N/A
Turnout		2,987	31.3	−1.8
Registered electors		9,541		
Labour hold		Swing		
Labour hold		Swing		
Labour hold		Swing		

=== Trowbridge (3 seats) ===
Trowbridge
Party	Candidate	Votes	%	±%
Labour	Bernie Bowen-Thomson*	1,545	57.6	N/A
Labour	Chris Lay*	1,470	54.8	N/A
Labour	Michael Michael*	1,398	52.1	N/A
Conservative	Catherine Elizabeth Dart	528	19.7	N/A
Conservative	Christopher Anthony Dart	480	17.9	N/A
Conservative	Geraint Hywel Payne	449	16.7	N/A
Common Ground	Jonathan Rhys Williams	367	13.7	N/A
Common Ground	Beca Evans	366	13.6	N/A
Common Ground	Martin Williams	278	10.4	N/A
Liberal Democrats	Chris Cogger	228	8.5	N/A
Propel	Leanne Lennox	197	7.3	N/A
Propel	Bernard Llewelyn Carleton	171	6.4	N/A
TUSC	Joanna Chojnicka	80	3.0	N/A
Turnout		2,684	22.8	−3.8
Registered electors		11,751		
Labour hold		Swing		
Labour hold		Swing		
Labour hold		Swing		

=== Whitchurch and Tongwynlais (4 seats) ===
Whitchurch & Tongwynlais
Party	Candidate	Votes	%	±%
Labour	Kate Carr	2,872	41.8	N/A
Labour	Marc Palmer	2,586	37.6	N/A
Labour	Jackie Jones	2,577	37.5	N/A
Labour	Jamie Green	2,547	37.1	N/A
Conservative	Linda Morgan*	1,941	28.2	N/A
Common Ground	Kate Prosser	1,825	26.6	N/A
Conservative	Mike Phillips*	1,812	26.4	N/A
Conservative	Mike Jones-Pritchard*	1,792	26.1	N/A
Common Ground	Gruffudd Jones	1,749	25.5	N/A
Common Ground	Tessa Hannah Marshall	1,738	25.3	N/A
Common Ground	Marc Flagg	1,727	25.1	N/A
Conservative	Sharon Owen	1,600	23.3	N/A
Liberal Democrats	Robert Godfrey	477	6.9	N/A
Liberal Democrats	Dominic Eggbeer	384	5.6	N/A
Liberal Democrats	Geraldine Marie Grant	318	4.6	N/A
Liberal Democrats	Pippa Shimmin	300	4.4	N/A
Turnout		6,872	52.9	−2.7
Registered electors		12,982		
Labour gain from Conservative		Swing		
Labour gain from Conservative		Swing		
Labour gain from Conservative		Swing		
Labour gain from Conservative		Swing		

== Reaction and aftermath ==
Labour leader Huw Thomas put the party's success down to the party's track record and a "positive campaign". The party had reached an historic third term in power, going forward Thomas promised to make Cardiff "stronger, greener, and fairer".

Adrian Robson leader of the Cardiff Conservatives blamed the election results on the national picture, Conservative party leader and Prime Minister Boris Johnson had become under fire for parties hosted during lockdown (See: Partygate)

== Changes 2022-2027 ==
=== By-elections ===
==== Grangetown (2024) ====
Grangetown by-election, 25 April 2024
Party	Candidate	Votes	%	±%
Labour	Waheeda Abdul Sattar	1,470	47.5	N/A
Common Ground	Kirstie Kopetzki	573	18.5	N/A
Conservative	Zak Weaver	387	12.5	N/A
Propel	Sash Patel	292	9.4	N/A
Independent	Ahmed Abdillahi Abdi Samater	205	6.6	N/A
Liberal Democrats	James Bear	123	4.0	N/A
Independent	Andrew Hovord	44	1.4	N/A
Majority		897	29.0	N/A
Turnout		3,049	20.3	−15.5
Registered electors				
Labour hold		Swing		

The by-election was caused by the death of Labour councillor Abdul Sattar on 15 February 2024.

==== Splott (2024) ====
Splott by-election: 5 December 2024
Party	Candidate	Votes	%	±%
Labour	Anny Anderson	711	34.0	N/A
Green	Sam Coates	362	17.3	N/A
Propel	Kyle Cullen	305	14.6	N/A
Liberal Democrats	Cadan ap Tomos	292	14.0	N/A
Reform	Lee Canning	271	13.0	N/A
Plaid Cymru	Leticia Gonzalez	88	4.2	N/A
Conservative	Tomos Llewelyn	60	2.9	N/A
Majority		349	16.7	N/A
Turnout		2,094	19.5	–11.8
Registered electors		10,762		
Labour hold		Swing	▼17.4	

The by-election was caused by the death of Labour councillor Jane Henshaw on 22/23 September 2024.

Her daughter succeeded her as Councillor.

==== Llanrumney (2025) ====
Llanrumney by-election, 24 July 2025
Party	Candidate	Votes	%	±%
Labour	Lexi Joanna Pocknell	755	39.4	N/A
Reform	Sidney Malik	630	32.9	N/A
Liberal Democrats	Wayne Street	281	14.7	N/A
Plaid Cymru	Joseph Oscar Gnagbo	138	7.2	N/A
Conservative	Ffin Elliott	64	3.3	N/A
Green	David Fitzpatrick	47	2.5	N/A
Majority		125	6.5	N/A
Turnout		1,915	24.0	−1.0
Registered electors		8,064		
Labour hold		Swing	▼20.6	

The by-election was caused by the resignation, for health reasons, of Labour councillor Heather Joyce, after representing Llanrumney for 17 years.

==== Grangetown (2025) ====
Grangetown by-election, 14 August 2025
Party	Candidate	Votes	%	±%
Green	Matt Youde	818	24.4	N/A
Labour	Khuram Chowdhry	774	23.1	N/A
Plaid Cymru	Neil Roberts	639	19.1	N/A
Reform	Joseph Martin	495	13.0	N/A
Propel	Vincent Yewlett	327	9.8	N/A
Independent	Ahmed Samater	158	4.7	N/A
Conservative	James Hamblin	139	4.1	N/A
Liberal Democrats	Irfan Latif	63	1.8	N/A
Majority		44	1.3	N/A
Turnout		3,411	26.7	−9.1
Registered electors		12,754		
Green gain from Labour		Swing		

The by-election was caused by the resignation of Labour councillor, Sara Robinson.

==== Trowbridge (2025) ====
Trowbridge by-election: 18 September 2025
Party	Candidate	Votes	%	±%
Reform	Edward Topham	1,142	39.6	N/A
Liberal Democrats	Chris Cogger	681	23.6	N/A
Labour	Gary Bowen-Thomson	615	21.3	N/A
Plaid Cymru	Carol Falcon	223	7.7	N/A
Conservative	Joe Roberts	90	3.1	N/A
Green	Jessica Ryan	67	2.3	N/A
Propel	Leanne Lennox	63	2.2	
Majority		527	16.0	N/A
Turnout		2,881		
Registered electors		11,663		
Reform gain from Labour		Swing		

There were 9 rejected ballot papers. 8 unmarked or void for uncertainty and one for voting for more than one candidate.

The by-election was caused by the resignation of Labour councillor, Chris Lay.

==== Splott (2026) ====
Splott by-election: 9 July 2026
Party	Candidate	Votes	%	±%
Labour	James Caruana	765	40.1	N/A
Green	Simran Patel	678	35.5	N/A
Reform	David John Cook	286	15.0	N/A
Liberal Democrats	Rhys William Husband	114	6.0	N/A
Conservative	Charles Agbakahi	54	2.8	N/A
Majority		87	4.6	N/A
Turnout		1,907	17.7	–1.8
Registered electors		10,762		
Labour hold		Swing		

The by-election was called following the election of Cardiff Council leader, Huw Thomas, to the Senedd in May 2026.

== See also ==
- List of electoral wards in Cardiff
