= Fairwater (Cardiff electoral ward) =

Fairwater ward
- Electoral ward
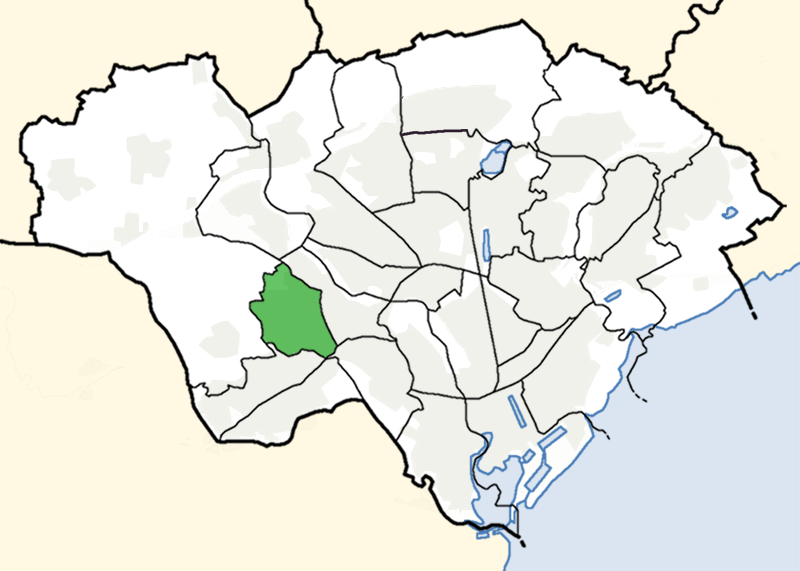
- Location of Fairwater ward within Cardiff
- Population: 12,981 (2011 census)
- Community: Fairwater
- Principal area: Cardiff
- Country: Wales
- Sovereign state: United Kingdom
- Post town: CARDIFF
- Postcode district: CF5
- Dialling code: +44-29
- UK Parliament: Cardiff West
- Senedd Cymru – Welsh Parliament: Caerdydd Penarth
- Councillors: 3

Fairwater is an electoral ward in the west of Cardiff, capital city of Wales. It covers Fairwater and Pentrebane on the outskirts of the urban area.

The Fairwater ward is bordered to the west by Pentyrch and St Fagans, to the east by Llandaff and to the south by the Ely ward.

== Background ==
Fairwater has elected three councillors to Cardiff Council since 1995, being represented by the Labour Party until May 2008 when all three seats were taken by Plaid Cymru.

Plaid Cymru (Fairwater and Pentrebane Voice) and Labour (Fairwater and Pentrebane Fightback) have both issued local campaigning newsletters containing allegations and counter-allegations against one another. These have included accusations that Cllr Michael Michael, a hairdresser, was profiting from a council leased building and allegations about Cllr McEvoy's expenses.

During the 2008 election campaign former MP Rod Richards, who lived in Fairwater, was arrested after assaulting a fellow Conservative Party campaigner.

Plaid lost a seat in May 2012 but regained it in 2017. Ward representatives have included Labour councillor Michael Michael, who was deputy leader of the Cardiff Council until 2008 and Plaid Cymru's Neil McEvoy, who was deputy leader of the council from 2008 to 2012. McEvoy had previously been a Labour Party councillor for the Riverside ward in the city and was also elected as a Plaid Cymru Assembly Member in the Wales Government in 2016. McEvoy was expelled from Plaid Cymru in 2018 and the remaining two councillors resigned the Plaid Cymru party whip in October 2019 in protest at the treatment of McEvoy. They remained as independent councillors.

McEoy retained his seat in 2022, this time standing for the Propel party.

== County councillors ==
Representation 1995 – date
Year	Labour	Plaid Cymru	Other
2022	2		1
2019	-	-	3
2018	-	2	1
2017	-	3	-
2012	1	2	-
2008	-	3	-
2004	3	-	-
1999	3	-	-
1995	3	-	-

== Elections ==
=== May 2022 ===
Attention was on the Fairwater ward in May 2022, with Neil McEvoy's new political party, Propel, hoping to win the seats previously won by his former party, Plaid Cymru. Plaid stood under the new coalition name of Common Ground. Whist McEvoy retained his seat, the other two seats were won by Labour.

2022 Cardiff Council election
Party	Candidate	Votes	%	±%
Labour	Claudia BOES	1,543	14.2	N/A
Propel	Neil McEVOY *	1,478	13.6	N/A
Labour	Saleh AHMED	1,455	13.4	N/A
Propel	Lisa FORD *	1,318	12.1	N/A
Labour	Lorna STABLER	1,300	12.0	N/A
Propel	Keith PARRY *	1,185	10.9	N/A
Common Ground	Neil ROBERTS	436	4.0	N/A
Conservative	David ADAMS	417	3.8	N/A
Common Ground	Philip CROXALL	383	3.5	N/A
Conservative	Natalie MATTHEWS	383	3.5	N/A
Common Ground	Erik WILLIAMS	344	3.2	N/A
Conservative	Clive WILLIAMS	343	3.2	N/A
Liberal Democrats	Eleri KIBALE	150	1.4	N/A
Liberal Democrats	Mark REES	126	1.2	N/A
Turnout		10,861		N/A
Registered electors		9,919		
Labour gain from Plaid Cymru		Swing		
Propel gain from Plaid Cymru		Swing		
Labour gain from Plaid Cymru		Swing		

=== May 2017 ===
2017 Cardiff Council election
Party	Candidate	Votes	%	±%
Plaid Cymru	Neil McEVOY *	2,414		
Plaid Cymru	Lisa FORD *	2,349		
Plaid Cymru	Keith PARRY	2,017		
Labour	Paul MITCHELL *	1,160		
Labour	John BAYLISS	1,101		
Labour	Irene HUMPHREYS	1,039		
Conservative	John WILLIAMS	535		
Conservative	Alan HILL	533		
Conservative	Ronald MICHAELIS	450		
Liberal Democrats	Eleri RANDERSON	203		
Green	Phillip CROXALL	190		
Liberal Democrats	Mark REES	92		
Liberal Democrats	Oliver TOWNSEND	92		
TUSC	Ross SAUNDERS	73		
Turnout			44.5%	

* = sitting councillor prior to the election
