= Canton (Cardiff electoral ward) =

Coordinates: 51.48°N 3.21°W

- Electoral ward
- Population: 16,146 (2021 census)
- Community: Canton
- Principal area: Cardiff
- Country: Wales
- Sovereign state: United Kingdom
- UK Parliament: Cardiff West
- Senedd Cymru – Welsh Parliament: Caerdydd Penarth
- Councillors: 3 (Cardiff Council)

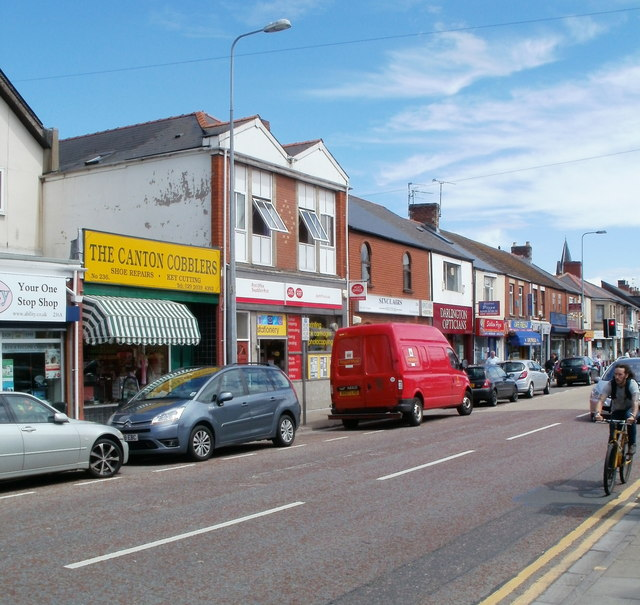

Canton is an electoral ward in the west of the city of Cardiff, Wales, which covers its namesake community, Canton. The ward elects three county councillors to the County Council of the City and County of Cardiff.

== Description and history ==
As far back as the late 19th-century Canton was a ward to Cardiff Town Council., and has served as a ward through various local government reorganisations and boundary changes.

The current Canton ward is bordered to the north by the Pencisely Road, to the west by the River Ely and stretching as far south as the Cardiff City Stadium. It is separated from the Riverside ward to the east by Llandaff Road.

The Canton ward boundaries are not aligned with the historical district of Canton, with a large section of Canton's main commercial thoroughfare Cowbridge Road East in the Riverside ward.

According to the 2011 census the population of the ward was 14,304.

In recent history Canton has been represented by the Labour Party. Councillors have included future Westminster MP, Kevin Brennan (1991-2001) and future South Glamorgan County Council leader Russell Goodway (1985-1991). Fellow Canton councillor David Thomas became Brennan's election agent during the 2001 General Election and subsequently became the MP's caseworker.

== Cardiff Council elections ==
The Canton ward has elected three Labour councillors at every election to the new Cardiff unitary authority since 1995.

At the May 2022 elections Stephen Cunnah, Susan Elsmore and Jasmin Chowdhury were elected.

May 2022 election results
Party	Candidate	Votes	%	±%
Labour	Stephen Cunnah*	2,761	47.8	N/A
Labour	Susan Elsmore*	2,629	45.5	N/A
Labour	Jasmin Chowdhury	2,460	42.5	N/A
Common Ground	Eleri Lewis	2,408	41.6	N/A
Common Ground	John ap Steffan	2,356	40.7	N/A
Common Ground	Matthew Hawkins	2,033	35.2	N/A
Conservative	Jonathon Segarty	485	8.4	N/A
Conservative	Bhupendra Pathak	440	7.6	N/A
Conservative	Muhammad Raz	414	7.2	N/A
Liberal Democrats	Henry George Mayall	205	3.5	N/A
Liberal Democrats	Ian John Newton	170	2.9	N/A
Propel	Osman Marks	132	2.3	N/A
Propel	Lucy Sarah Stayt	111	1.9	N/A
Propel	John Gabb	97	1.7	N/A
TUSC	Taryn Tarrant-Cornish	76	1.3	N/A
Turnout		5,782	47.2	−4.1
Registered electors		12,259		

* = sitting councillor prior to the election

=== 2014 by-election ===
Labour councillor (since 2008) Cerys Furlong resigned in December 2013 because of difficulties balancing her council work with her main job and her family. A by-election took place on 20 February 2014, with the Labour candidate Susan Elsmore coming top of the poll, with Plaid Cymru in second place.

== Cardiff City Council elections ==
Prior to 1995 Canton was an electoral ward to Cardiff City Council (a district council of South Glamorgan). The ward elected three city councillors. All three city councillors were from the Conservative Party, from 1976 until being replaced by the Labour Party at the 1991 election.

== South Glamorgan Council elections ==
Prior to 1995 Canton was a ward to South Glamorgan County Council. Two county councillors were elected at the 1973, 1977 and 1981 elections (both Conservatives until 1981). From 1985 the ward elected a single councillor. Labour's Russell Goodway was the representative until the 1991 election (when he became councillor for the Glan Ely ward).

== Cardiff County Borough Council ==
Canton has been an electoral ward in Cardiff since the 19th-century, to Cardiff Borough Council and (between 1889 and 1974) Cardiff County Borough Council.

At the final elections of the county borough on 7 May 1970, Canton's Conservative councillor Trevor Tyrrell successfully held his seat with a 382 majority over the Labour candidate.

Cardiff council election, May 1970
Party	Candidate	Votes	%	±%
Conservative	Trevor Tyrrell *	1,665	50.8	
Labour	Dengar Robinson Evans	1,283	39.1	
Plaid Cymru	Reginald James Stuart	332	10.1	

At the first full elections to Cardiff County Borough Council on 1 November 1889, Canton was one of only two wards to hold a contest. The two sitting Liberal Party councillors retained the seat with a healthy majority, against what the local newspaper described as a "so-called Independent" candidate.

Cardiff council election, November 1889
Party	Candidate	Votes	%	±%
Liberal	S. Mildon *	1,345		
Liberal	W. Sanders *	1,272		
Independent	Henry Butler	837		

* Ward 'retiring' councillor
