= Liberal Democrat–Green Party alliance =

Political alliance in England

In the politics of England, the term Liberal Democrat–Green Party alliance has been used to describe a series of limited and largely ad hoc electoral and political arrangements involving the Liberal Democrats and the Green Party of England and Wales. These have included candidates standing aside for one another, joint candidate lists in selected local elections, and cooperation between councillors on elected bodies. Such arrangements became more prominent following the 2016 Brexit referendum, as supporters of a wider progressive alliance experimented with local cooperation to reduce vote-splitting under the first-past-the-post electoral system. They did not develop into a permanent formal alliance between the two national parties.

== Instances ==
=== Richmond Park by-election in 2016 ===
At the 2016 Richmond Park by-election, the Green Party chose not to field a candidate and instead supported the Liberal Democrat candidate, Sarah Olney, as part of a proposed progressive alliance against former Conservative MP Zac Goldsmith. Goldsmith had resigned his seat and stood as an independent after the government backed the expansion of Heathrow Airport. Olney defeated Goldsmith by 1,872 votes.

Following the election, three members of the Kingston Green Party alleged in a leaked report that party staff had encouraged the local party to stand aside because a prospective £250,000 donation was conditional on the Greens demonstrating their commitment to the progressive alliance initiative. The allegation led to claims that the proposed donation amounted to a bribe. The Green Party denied that its decision had been influenced by the offer, stating that the prospective candidate had already withdrawn, that the offer was refused and that no donation had been conditional on the party standing aside.

In May 2017, Green Party co-leader Caroline Lucas confirmed that an offer of £250,000 had been made, but said it came after the decision not to contest the election and was rejected. The Metropolitan Police said that a complaint had been made but that prosecutors considered that no offence had been committed, because the intended Green candidate was not formally a candidate when the offer was made.

=== Richmond upon Thames London Borough Council election in 2018 ===
For the 2018 local elections, the Liberal Democrats and Greens in Richmond upon Thames reached an electoral arrangement under which joint slates of two Liberal Democrats and one Green were fielded in several three-member wards. The arrangement developed from discussions begun after the Greens chose not to field a candidate against Liberal Democrat Sarah Olney in the 2016 Richmond Park by-election, in which she defeated Zac Goldsmith.

=== General elections in 2017 and 2019 ===
In the 2017 general election, the Liberal Democrats and Green Party refrained from standing candidates against each other for certain constituencies in Brighton and Oxford. Such informal arrangements ensured the successful re-election of the only Green MP Caroline Lucas for Brighton Pavilion and resulted in the Liberal Democrats regaining Oxford West and Abingdon as Layla Moran was elected there. During the 2019 general election, this was extended to more constituencies, as part of the Unite to Remain campaign in order to boost each other's chances of winning those seats.

=== Oxfordshire County Council election in 2021 ===
Liberal Democrat and Green councillors elected to Oxfordshire County Council, following the local elections in May 2021, formed a joint group prior to negotiations to form a coalition administration also including the Labour Party. These councillors sit in a grouping formally known as the Liberal Democrat Green Alliance. The leader of this group, and of the council, was Liz Leffman.

=== Wealden District Council election in 2023 ===
Following the 2023 local elections, Wealden District Council came under no overall control with the Liberal Democrats holding 13 seats and the Green Party holding 11. The two agreed to form a co-operative alliance in which the position of council leader will rotate between the leaders of both party groups on an annual basis.

=== Dorset Council election in 2024 ===
Following the 2024 Dorset Council election, the new Liberal Democrat cabinet included Green Party councillor Clare Sutton.

== Party positions and policy ==
=== Liberal Democrat policy ===
The Liberal Democrats are officially opposed to alliances, with senior party figures preferring a non-aggression pact with Labour over unilaterally standing down.

=== Green policy ===
The Green Party has supported electoral co-operation with other progressive parties where this is considered necessary to avoid vote-splitting and maximise progressive representation, including reciprocal candidate stand-downs with the Liberal Democrats and Plaid Cymru in the 2019 general election.

== See also ==
- Co-operation between the Green Party and Plaid Cymru
- Progressive alliance (UK)
- SDP–Liberal Alliance
- Lib–Lab pact
