= Grangetown (Cardiff electoral ward) =

Grangetown ward
- Electoral ward
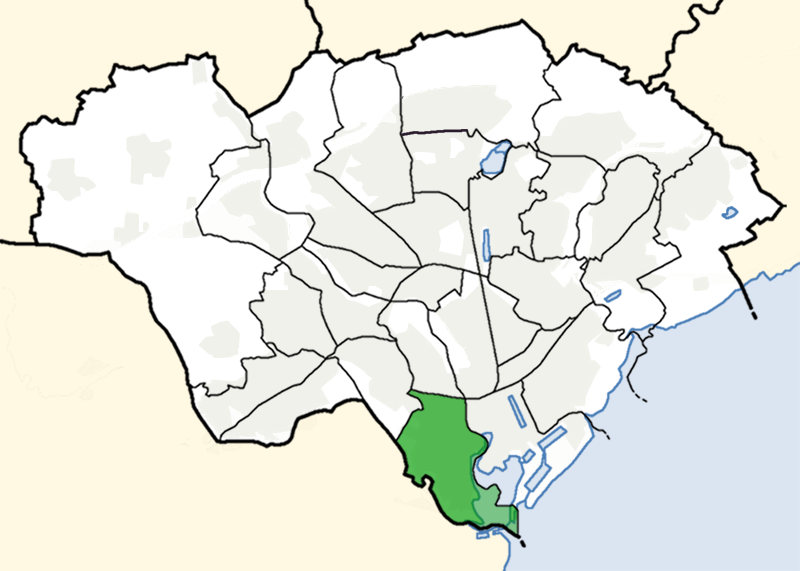
- Location of Grangetown ward within Cardiff
- Population: 20,800 (2021 census)
- Principal area: Cardiff
- Country: Wales
- Sovereign state: United Kingdom
- Post town: CARDIFF
- Postcode district: CF11
- Dialling code: +44-29
- UK Parliament: Cardiff South & Penarth
- Senedd Cymru – Welsh Parliament: Caerdydd Penarth
- Councillors: 4

Grangetown is an electoral ward in the city of Cardiff, Wales. It covers its namesake community of Grangetown. The ward was originally created in 1890 as a ward to Cardiff County Borough Council.

== Description ==
The Grangetown ward lies to the south of the city between the rivers Taff and Ely. The ward elects four councillors to Cardiff Council. Traditionally represented by the Labour Party it has, in the 2000s, also elected Liberal Democrat and Plaid Cymru councillors.

According to the 2011 census the population of the ward was 19,385, this rose to 20,800 by the 2021 census

Following a Cardiff boundary review, intended to give better electoral parity, the number of councillors for the Grangetown ward was increased from 3 to 4, effective from the 2022 Cardiff Council election.

== Election results ==
=== 2025 by-election ===
A by-election was called for the 14 August 2025, following the stepping down of Labour councillor, Sara Robinson. The vacant seat was won by the Green Party, their first ever seat on Cardiff Council and their first ever by-election win in Wales.

2025 Grangetown by-election
Party	Candidate	Votes	%	±%
Green	Matt Youde	818	24.4%	
Labour	Khuram Chowdhry	774	23.1%	
Plaid Cymru	Neil Roberts	639	19.1%	
Reform	Joseph Martin	495	13.0%	
Propel	Vincent Yewlett	327	9.8%	
Independent	Ahmed Samater	158	4.7%	
Conservative	James Hamblin	139	4.1%	
Liberal Democrats	Irfan Latif	63	1.8%	
Turnout			26.7	
Green gain from Labour				

=== 2024 by-election ===
Following the death of Abdul Sattar in February, a by-election was called for 25 April 2024. Seven candidates put themselves forward to fill the vacancy, including Sattar's widow Waheeda Sattar the eventual winner.

2024 Grangetown by-election
Party	Candidate	Votes	%	±%
Labour	Waheeda Abdul Sattar	1,470	47.5%	N/A
Common Ground	Kirstie Kopetzki	573	18.5%	N/A
Conservative	Zak Weaver	387	12.5%	N/A
Propel	Sash Patel	292	9.4%	N/A
Independent	Ahmed Abdillahi Abdi Samater	205	6.6%	N/A
Liberal Democrats	James Robin Bear	123	3.9%	N/A
Independent	Andrew Charles Hovord	44	1.4%	N/A
Turnout		3094	20.3	
Labour hold				

=== 2022 ===
Following a boundary review the number of seats increased from three to four. The boundaries themselves for this ward remained unchanged.

2022 Cardiff Council election
Party	Candidate	Votes	%	±%
Labour	Ash Lister*	2,885	56.4	N/A
Labour	Sara Elisabeth Robinson	2,733	53.4	N/A
Labour	Abdul Sattar*	2,665	52.1	N/A
Labour	Lynda Doreen Thorne*	2,533	49.5	N/A
Common Ground	Tariq Awan	1,511	29.5	N/A
Common Ground	Sarah King	1,382	27.0	N/A
Common Ground	Luke Nicholas	1,312	25.7	N/A
Common Ground	Frankie-Rose Taylor	1,131	22.1	N/A
Conservative	Joseph Anyaike	487	9.5	N/A
Conservative	Conor Holohan	478	9.3	N/A
Conservative	Llŷr Tomos Powell	442	8.6	N/A
Conservative	Vivienne Ward	425	8.3	N/A
Liberal Democrats	David Paul Morgan	266	5.2	N/A
Liberal Democrats	Irfan Latif	258	5.0	N/A
Liberal Democrats	Aamir Sheikh	250	4.9	N/A
Propel	Jonathan Paul Gee	175	3.4	N/A
Propel	Sailesh Patel	162	3.2	N/A
Propel	Michael James Voyce	150	2.9	N/A
TUSC	Joe Fathallah	109	2.1	N/A
Turnout		5,115	35.8	−1.5
Registered electors		14,304		
Labour hold		Swing		
Labour hold		Swing		
Labour hold		Swing		
Labour win (new seat)				

Abdul Sattar died suddenly aged 53, on 15 February 2024.

=== 2017 ===
At the May 2017 County Council elections Labour won all three seats, winning back the seat lost to Plaid Cymru in November 2016. Ashley Lister, grandson of the late councillor Chris Lomax (who died in September 2016) topped the poll by a single vote.

2017 Cardiff Council election
Party	Candidate	Votes	%	±%
Labour	Ashley Lister	2199		
Labour	Abdul Sattar	2198		
Labour	Lynda Thorne *	2121		
Plaid Cymru	Tariq Awan *	1757		
Plaid Cymru	Richard Vaughan	1438		
Plaid Cymru	Lisa Musa	1310		
Conservative	Michael Bryan	671		
Conservative	Jenna Malvisi	604		
Conservative	Andrew Pike	580		
Liberal Democrats	Jahangir Hussain	350		
Green	Simon Morton	272		
Liberal Democrats	Malcolm Evans	232		
Liberal Democrats	Muhammed Latif	194		
TUSC	Lianne Francis	65		
TUSC	Joe Fathallah	46		

=== 2016 by-election ===
Following the death of Labour councillor Chris Lomax a by-election was held on 3 November 2016 which was won by Plaid Cymru candidate Tariq Awan, though by only 114 votes.

2016 Grangetown by-election
Party	Candidate	Votes	%	±%
Plaid Cymru	Tariq Awan	1163		
Labour	Maliika Kaaba	1049		
Conservative	Michael Bryan	287		
UKIP	Richard Lewis	141		
Liberal Democrats	Ashgar Ali	127		

=== 2012 ===
In May 2012 Labour won back from the Liberal Democrats the three seats they had previously lost in 2004, with Plaid Cymru having a strong surge.

2012 Cardiff Council elections
Party	Candidate	Votes	%	±%
Labour	Ashley Govier	1,812		
Labour	Chris Lomax	1,709		
Labour	Lynda Doreen Thorne	1,704		
Plaid Cymru	Abdul Sattar	1,511		
Plaid Cymru	Mohammed Tariq Awan	1,467		
Plaid Cymru	Luke Nicholas	1,391		
Liberal Democrats	Francesca Eva Sara Montemaggi *	505		
Liberal Democrats	David Morgan *	501		
Liberal Democrats	Paul Harding	489		
Conservative	Vincent Bailey	308		
Conservative	Axel Kaehne	266		
Conservative	Karys Oram	251		
Green	Sian Best	215		
Green	Ken Barker	205		
Christian	Clive Stanley Bate	84		
Communist	Rick Newnham	77		

=== 2008 ===
In May 2008, the Liberal Democrats successfully defended their three seats.

2008 Cardiff Council elections
Party	Candidate	Votes	%	±%
Liberal Democrats	Francesca Montemaggi *	1,357		
Liberal Democrats	Asghar Ali *	1,319		
Liberal Democrats	David Morgan	1,317		
Labour	Lynda Doreen Thorne	1,138		
Labour	Stephen Brooks	1,131		
Labour	David Collins	1,104		
Plaid Cymru	Farida Alsam	1,099		
Plaid Cymru	Patrick Daley	1,009		
Plaid Cymru	Ioan Bellin	920		
Conservative	Benjamin Green	546		
Conservative	Mark Jones	533		
Conservative	Michael Wallbank	482		
Communist	Rick Newnham	111		

=== 2004 ===
In May 2004 the Liberal Democrats won all three seats from the Labour Party. Labour councillor Peter Perkins had represented the area since 1981, initially for the Marl ward before it became part of Grangetown.

2004 Cardiff Council elections
Party	Candidate	Votes	%	±%
Liberal Democrats	Margaret Winifred Jones	1,424		
Liberal Democrats	Francesca Montemaggi	1,417		
Liberal Democrats	Asghar Ali	1,404		
Labour	Lynda Doreen Thorne *	1,122		
Labour	Iftakhar Mohammad Khan	1,113		
Labour	Peter George Perkins *	1,072		
Plaid Cymru	Patrick Daley	838		
Plaid Cymru	Abul Faiz M. Belal	764		
Plaid Cymru	Jason Scott Toby	749		
Conservative	Jean Summerhayes	427		
Conservative	Adrian John Spinola	420		
Conservative	Richard Peter Mendelssohn	369		

== Cardiff County Borough Council ==
=== 1970 ===
At the last elections to the pre-1974 county borough council on 7 May 1970, Labour's Bernard Matthewson returned to the council, defeating Grangetown's sitting Conservative councillor after a recount.

1970 Cardiff City Council election
Party	Candidate	Votes	%	±%
Labour	Armour Bernard Matthewson	1,260		
Conservative	Anthea Jean Thomas *	1,249		
Plaid Cymru	Peter Stayeley McMullen	315		
Turnout				
Labour gain from Conservative		Swing		

=== 1890 ===
At the first Grangetown election on 1 November 1890, John Jenkins, a shipwright and a nominee of Cardiff Trades Council, was declared to be the first genuine working man's representative elected to the council. There were a large number of seafaring households in the south of the ward.

1890 Cardiff City Council election
Party	Candidate	Votes	%	±%
Lib-Lab	John Jenkins	484		
Conservative	Robert Upham	260		
Turnout		753	61.4	

=== Ward creation ===
In July 1890, following the creation of Cardiff County Borough Council, Grangetown was the name of one of the ten new electoral wards created in the county borough. Each of the three councillors took turns to stand for re-election, on a three-yearly cycle.

* = sitting councillor prior to the election
