= Plasnewydd =

Plasnewydd ward
- Electoral ward
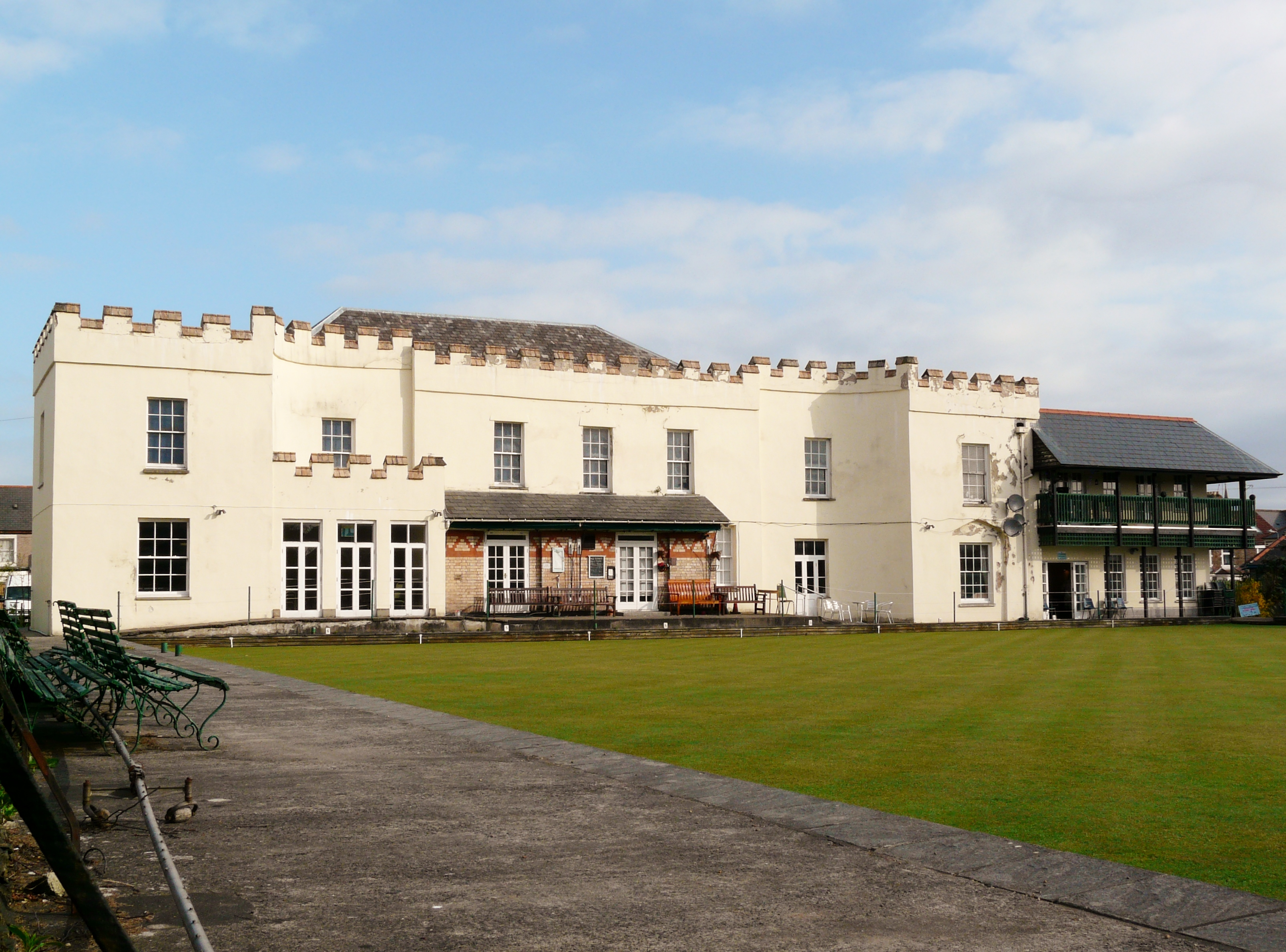
- The Mackintosh Centre

- Location within Cardiff
- Population: 18,166 (2011 Census)
- OS grid reference: ST191775
- Principal area: Cardiff
- Country: Wales
- Sovereign state: United Kingdom
- Post town: CARDIFF
- Postcode district: CF24
- Dialling code: 29
- UK Parliament: Cardiff East
- Senedd Cymru – Welsh Parliament: Caerdydd Ffynnon Taf
- Councillors: 4
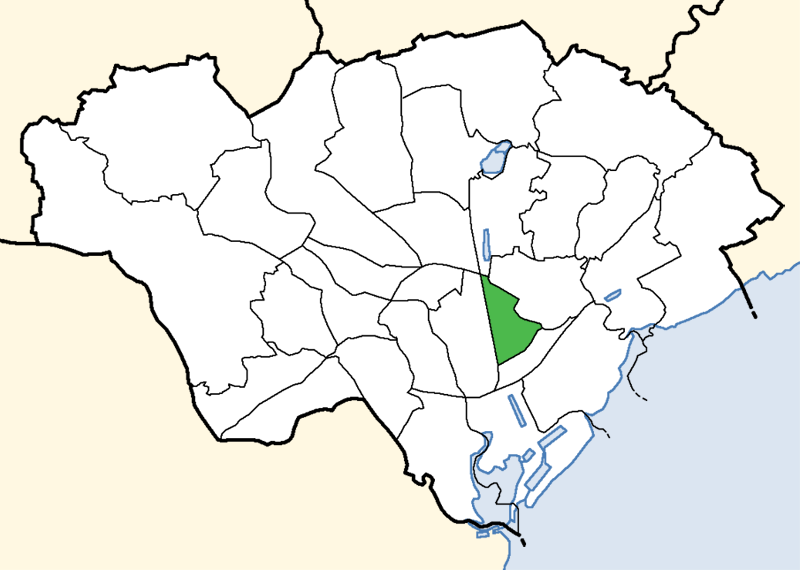
- List of places UK Wales Cardiff 51.491°N 3.167°W Location of Plasnewydd ward in Cardiff

Plasnewydd (meaning New Manor or New Place) is an electoral ward (and formerly the name of a community) of Cardiff, Wales. It is within the UK parliamentary constituency of Cardiff East and Senedd constituency of Caerdydd Ffynnon Taf. It is bounded by the electoral wards of Cyncoed (Roath Park) to the north; Penylan to the northeast; Adamsdown (main Newport Road) to the southwest; and Cathays (Cardiff to Caerphilly railway) to the west. It covers what is now the community of Roath.

The ward population taken at the 2011 census was 18,166.

== History ==
Plasnewydd takes its name from a 17th-century house called "The New Place", originally a home of Edwards Richard and, in 1890, given to the local people. It later became the Mackintosh Community Centre. Roath and Plasnewydd were absorbed into Cardiff in 1875. The main road through the village, Castle Road, was renamed City Road in 1905 to mark Cardiff's new city status.

Plasnewydd was previously the name of the Roath community until the Boundary Commission renamed it in the 2010s.

== Electoral ward ==
Plasnewydd ward elects four councillors to sit on Cardiff Council. In 2010 a Boundary Commission report was published recommending a number of boundary changes and ward renaming in Cardiff. Amongst them was a proposal to change the name of Plasnewydd electoral division to "Roath". Ultimately the changes were not taken forward.

=== Local elections ===
==== 2022 ====
Cardiff Council election, 5 May 2022
Party	Candidate	Votes	%	±%
Labour	Daniel Martin De'Ath *	3,055	17%	
Labour	Sue Lent *	2,679	15%	
Labour	Mary McGarry *	2,675	15%	
Labour	Peter Wong*	2,651	15%	
Common Ground	Adam James Layzell	905	5%	
Common Ground	Owen Benedict Ruari McArdle	766	4%	
Liberal Democrats	Clare James	724	4%	
Common Ground	Morgan Meurig Rogers	676	4%	
Common Ground	Ned Parish	640	4%	
Liberal Democrats	Richard Anthony Jerrett	609	3%	
Liberal Democrats	Geraldine Nichols	587	3%	
Liberal Democrats	Phil Jones	531	2%	
Conservative	Luke Doherty	233	1%	
Conservative	Nigel Richards	202	1%	
Conservative	James McClenn	184	1%	
Conservative	Zach Stubbings	177	1%	
TUSC	John Aaron Williams	172	1%	
The Sovereign Party / Plaid Sofren	Justin Lilley	57	0%	
Turnout				

* = sitting councillor prior to the election

==== 2017 ====
Cardiff Council election, 4 May 2017
Party	Candidate	Votes	%	±%
Labour	Susan Janet Lent *	2,408	14%	
Labour	Daniel Martin De'Ath *	2,311	13%	
Labour	Deborah Mary Samothrakis	2,159	12%	
Labour	Peter Wong	2,055	12%	
Liberal Democrats	Manzoor Ahmed	1,545	9%	
Liberal Democrats	Robin Thomas Rea *	1,531	9%	
Liberal Democrats	Cadan Dyfynnog Hedd Ap Tomos	1,410	8%	
Liberal Democrats	Richard Anthony Jerrett	1,300	7%	
Green	Daniel Stuart William Ward	560	3%	
Plaid Cymru	Mariana Diaz Montiel	371	2%	
Plaid Cymru	Angharad Florence Price Lewis	346	2%	
Plaid Cymru	Matthew Gwyn Lloyd	331	2%	
Conservative	Enid Margaret Harries	297	2%	
Conservative	Lucy Golding	289	2%	
Conservative	Rowland Hemingway	252	1%	
Conservative	Marc Gonzalez	223	1%	
Turnout		4,611	39%	

* = sitting councillor prior to the election

==== 2016 by-election ====
Following the death of Labour councillor, Mohammed Javed, early in 2016, a by-election was held for the vacant seat. It was won by the Liberal Democrats with a 15% increase on their 2012 vote.

Plasnewydd by-election, 20 September 2016
Party	Candidate	Votes	%	±%
Liberal Democrats	Robin Thomas Rea	1,258	48%	
Labour	Peter Wong	910	34%	
Plaid Cymru	Glenn Charles Page	177	7%	
Conservative	Munawar Ahmed Mughal	115	5%	
Green	Michael David Cope	93	4%	
UKIP	Lawrence Gwynn	62	2%	
Turnout		2,615	23%	

==== 2012 ====
The council's Liberal Democrat leader Rodney Berman had previously represented the Plasnewydd ward until he was defeated, following two recounts, in the May 2012 Council elections. Following the election, all four seats were represented by the Labour Party.

==== Cardiff City Council 1973–1996 ====
Plasnewydd was a ward for Cardiff City Council between 1973 and 1996, electing three Conservative councillors at the 1973, 1976 and 1979 elections. In 1983 the size of the ward increased and representation increased to 4 councillors, with the Conservatives losing their control of the ward over the next two elections. Four Labour councillors were elected at the May 1991 elections.
