= SDP–Liberal Alliance =

1981–1988 electoral alliance in the UK

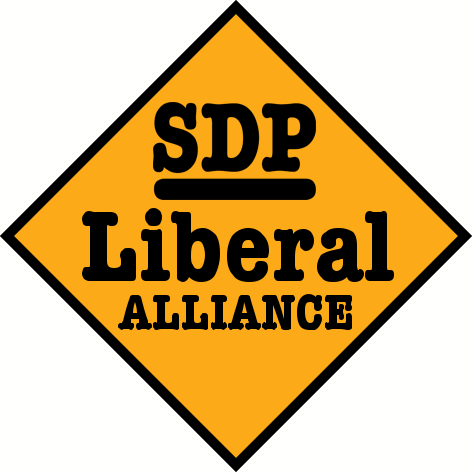
- Founded: 16 June 1981
- Dissolved: 3 March 1988
- Succeeded by: Liberal Democrats
- Ideology: Social liberalism
- Political position: Centre
- Member parties: Social Democratic Party; Liberal Party
- Colours: Gold (1987)

The SDP–Liberal Alliance was a centrist and social liberal political and electoral alliance in the United Kingdom between the Social Democratic Party (SDP) and Liberal Party.

The SDP–Liberal Alliance was established in 1981, initially on an informal basis, between Roy Jenkins of the SDP and David Steel of the Liberals. They contested the 1982 United Kingdom local elections, 1983 United Kingdom local elections, 1983 general election, 1984 United Kingdom local elections, 1984 European election, 1985 United Kingdom local elections, 1986 United Kingdom local elections, 1987 United Kingdom local elections and 1987 general election. Throughout, the two parties remained distinct, but deliberately did not contest races where the other had a candidate. Despite receiving about a quarter of the vote in 1983 and 1987, the Alliance never achieved major parliamentary success.

The SDP–Liberal Alliance ceased to exist in 1988, when the majority of both component parties merged to form the Social and Liberal Democrats. They stood in the 1988 United Kingdom local elections under that label, before being renamed the Liberal Democrats.

== History ==
Following the establishment of the Social Democratic Party (SDP) by the 'Gang of Four' (Roy Jenkins, David Owen, Bill Rodgers, Shirley Williams), who had left the Labour Party in March 1981, the SDP entered into an informal alliance with the Liberal Party, led by David Steel. The SDP fought its first by-election, in Warrington, with future leader Roy Jenkins standing as "SDP with Liberal support".

On 16 June 1981, this arrangement was formalised into an alliance, with both parties agreeing to stand down in each other's favour and govern as a coalition government if the two parties ever won enough seats between them for a majority. Between 1981 and 1983, the parties together won seats in by-elections in:

- Croydon North West (Bill Pitt, a Liberal),
- Crosby (Shirley Williams of the SDP),
- Glasgow Hillhead (Roy Jenkins of the SDP), and
- Bermondsey (Simon Hughes of the Liberals, with the largest swing ever recorded in any British election).

The formation of the SDP and the subsequent alliance came at a time when the British economy was in a deep recession and Margaret Thatcher's Conservative government was proving unpopular; since coming to power in May 1979, unemployment had risen from over 1,500,000 to 3,000,000 and beyond by 1982, driven mainly by a sharp contraction in the manufacturing sector. In 1981, there were riots in London's Brixton, Birmingham's Handsworth, Leeds' Chapeltown, Liverpool's Toxteth and Manchester's Moss Side.

Meanwhile, Labour had shifted dramatically to the left since the election in 1980 of Michael Foot as party leader. As much distaste as some voters had for Thatcher's Conservative government, many people were just as opposed to the prospect of Foot as Prime Minister. Many also viewed Tony Benn negatively. Having moved over to the hard left, he had been given the position of Shadow Minister without Portfolio which freed him up from formal ministerial obligations while still affording him high status. His public appearances at events organised by Militant, a far-left entryist group, alienated key Labour figures.

As part of the Alliance, Steel agreed to serve in the coalition government under the SDP leader as prime minister. With an election not due until May 1984, the Alliance proved to be an instant hit with voters who were disgruntled with the Conservatives and Labour, as many opinion polls in late 1981 and early 1982 showed the Alliance leading opinion polling by a wide margin, peaking with a 50% showing – up to twice the level of support shown for the Conservatives around this time. Steel was so certain that the Liberals would be part of a government for the first time in over half a century that when he addressed the 1981 Liberal Party conference, he famously declared, "Go back to your constituencies, and prepare for government!"

However, a series of events followed which saw the political tables turn. Argentine forces invaded the British dependent territory of the Falkland Islands on 2 April 1982. A Security Council Resolution 502 was passed the next day demanding an immediate Argentine withdrawal, which was ignored, so Thatcher sent out a task force to recapture the islands—by military means, if necessary. The UK won the conflict on 14 June, and subsequent opinion polls showed the Conservatives firmly in the lead. With a general election due by May 1984, it seemed that the most anticipated outcome would be whether the Alliance or Labour formed the next opposition. A Conservative re-election was looking even more likely as 1982 drew to a close, as the recession came to an end and inflation had been cut to 4% from a massive 27% within four years, although unemployment remained above 3,000,000. She felt confident enough to hold an election in June 1983 – a year earlier than necessary.

The Alliance exploited the nation's mass unemployment in the run-up to the election, running a "Working Together for Britain" campaign which it promised would see unemployment reduced by up to 1,000,000.

=== 1983 general election and aftermath ===
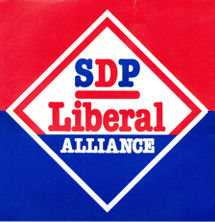
SDP–Liberal Alliance electoral logo in 1983

The Alliance won 25.4% of the national vote in the 1983 general election, compared to Labour's 27.6%. However, a mere 23 Alliance Members of Parliament (MPs) were elected (17 of whom were Liberal), compared to Labour's 209. The SDP came second in many constituencies, including nearly 70% of the Conservative-won seats, though the bulk of Labour's defectors to the SDP in 1981 lost their seats. Due to the first past the post electoral system, this success did not translate into parliamentary seats. The SDP's support was spread out across the country, and was not concentrated in enough areas to win more seats. The split in the centre-left vote is claimed to have helped the Conservatives to win the election by a landslide.

Both the SDP and the Liberals were committed to proportional representation, under which system they would have elected more MPs to the House of Commons.

The Alliance came under heavy criticism from Foot in the aftermath of the 1983 election; he condemned them for "siphoning" support away from the Labour Party and enabling the Conservatives to win more seats.

The 1983 election had given the Conservatives a triple-digit majority, but within months a strong challenge to their power – and to the challenge posed by the Alliance – was showing as Foot stood down in favour of Neil Kinnock, who immediately reversed the party's hard-left turn. This resulted in a dramatic rise in Labour fortunes in the opinion polls – some of which showed them ahead of the Conservatives and the Alliance by March 1984. However, at least one opinion poll showed the Alliance ahead of the Conservatives and Labour as late as September 1985. By this stage, the recession had ended three years earlier and the battle against inflation had clearly been won; however unemployment – seen as a major factor in a string of inner city riots that autumn – was still above 3,000,000. With the economy further improving over the next 18 months and unemployment finally starting to fall, however, Thatcher felt confident to call a general election for 11 June 1987 – although the deadline for the election was 12 months later.

=== 1987 general election and aftermath ===
The Alliance failed to maintain momentum. In the 1987 general election, each party's vote share fell slightly; the Liberals won 17 seats (the same as in 1983), while the SDP won five (one fewer than four years previously), while Labour were firmly established as Britain's second major political party with a much stronger showing than in 1983, although the Conservatives still achieved a third successive election win with Thatcher still at the helm.

=== 1988 merger ===
By 1987, relations had become fraught. Despite this, Steel proposed a merger of the two parties following the 1987 general election. The majority of members of both parties agreed, and a merger was effected early in 1988. The new party was named the Social and Liberal Democrats, shortened in October 1989 to the Liberal Democrats.

=== Remaining factions ===
Small factions of both parties continued under the names of the SDP and the Liberal Party but, as each was made up of those members who least trusted the other party, there was no chance that the two 'continuing' parties would co-operate.

The SDP was re-established under the leadership of one of the founders of the SDP, David Owen, who had objected to the merger of the two parties. Owen and the party's national executive dissolved the party in 1990, but another group of party members continue the party under the SDP name.

The Liberal Party was re-established under the leadership of Michael Meadowcroft and continues to operate. However, many members of this continuity party, including Meadowcroft himself, have since joined the mainstream Liberal Democrats.

== General election results ==
Election	Leaders	Votes		Seats		Position	Government
Election	Leaders	No.	%	No.	±	Position	Government
1983	Roy Jenkins (SDP) and David Steel (Liberal)	7,780,949	25.4	23 / 650	▲12	3rd	Conservative
1987	David Owen (SDP) and David Steel (Liberal)	7,341,651	22.6	22 / 650	▼1	3rd	Conservative
Parties merged in 1988 to form the Liberal Democrats

== See also ==
- List of Liberal Party and Liberal Democrats (UK) general election manifestos
- Lib–Lab pact
- Liberal Democrat–Green Party alliance
