= Joseff Gnagbo =

Welsh activist (born c. 1974)

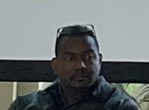
- Josef Gnagbo speaking at one of Melin Drafod's events in 2023
- Born: 1974 (age 51–52); Abidjan, Ivory Coast
- Other name: Joseph Gnagbo
- Political party: Plaid Cymru

Joseff Oscar Gnagbo (born c. 1974) is an Ivorian–born Welsh activist, teacher, linguist and musician from Cardiff. He was chairman of the Welsh Language Society between 2023 and 2025. Gnagbo came to Wales from the Ivory Coast in 2017 as an asylum seeker, in the midst of the military revolution. He quickly learned the Welsh language and became a Welsh tutor. He became chairman of Cymdeithas yr Iaith in October 2023. He is the first person who was born outside Wales to chair the Association. He was re-elected Chairman of the Association in 2024.

== Background ==
Gnagbo was a native of Abidjan, where he was a journalist and language teacher. Gnagbo was a musician and rapper, using his music to rally support for President Laurent Gbagbo during the 2010–2011 Ivorian crisis. In 2010, with the beginning of the civil war, French-backed rebels took over Abidjan and tracked down government supporters, including Gnagbo. He evaded capture twice by armed rebels, who killed several of his relatives during other searches. Gnagbo fled the country in 2011, first living in Morocco for six years before seeking asylum in the United Kingdom in 2017, following increased military relations between Morocco and Ivory Coast.

Before arriving in Wales, Gnagbo spoke and composed music in French, German, Italian, English, and Swahili. But in an interview with the Radio YesCymru podcast he stated that he could not speak any of the indigenous languages of the Ivory Coast as none of them were taught to him by his parents, and the influence of French was so strong. His father spoke the Dida language. This influenced his belief in the importance of learning native languages. In an interview, he said: "I really like the sound of the Welsh language—and one of my favourite words is 'gwdihoo'!" One of the reasons he learned Welsh was because he saw similarities in the situation with the power of languages in his homeland.

He has two children who go to a Welsh medium school in Cardiff.

== Campaigner ==
As well as being Chairman of the Cymdeithas yr Iaith Welsh, Gnagbo has been vocal in his support for independence for Wales. He is a campaigner for refugee rights.

He spoke at a meeting of the pro-independence think tank, Melin Drafod at the Plaid Cymru conference in 2024 discussing the importance of the Welsh language to the campaign for independence and in an independent Wales again. He was a Plaid Cymru candidate in the Llanrumney ward at the 2025 by-election to Cardiff Council. He stood as a candidate in the Caerdydd Ffynnon Taf constituency in the 2026 Senedd election but was not elected, though he became the first refugee to stand as a candidate in the Senedd.

== Honours ==
At the 2024 National Eisteddfod of Wales he was inaugurated into the blue robe of Gorsedd y Beirdd.
