= Radyr (electoral ward) =

Electoral ward in Wales

Radyr ward
- electoral ward
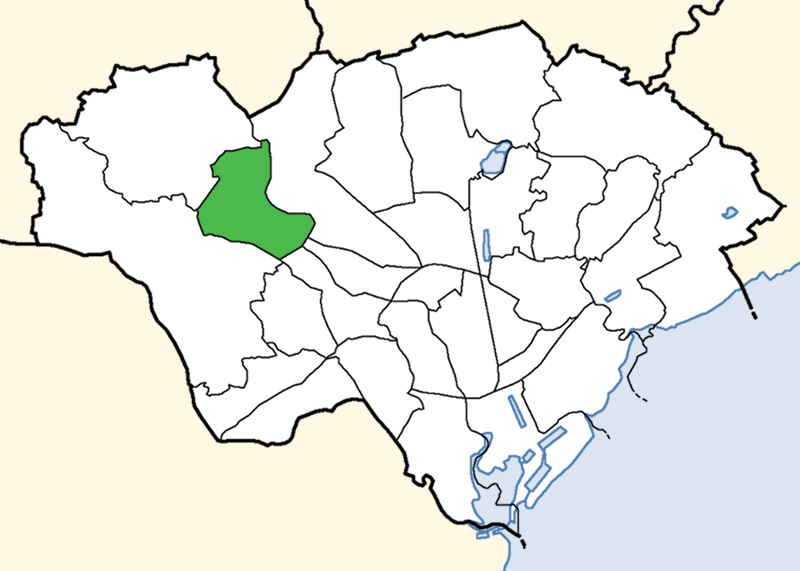
- Radyr ward location within Cardiff
- Population: 6,417 (2011 census)
- Community: Radyr and Morganstown
- Principal area: Cardiff
- Country: Wales
- Sovereign state: United Kingdom
- Post town: CARDIFF
- Postcode district: CF15
- Dialling code: +44-29
- UK Parliament: Cardiff West
- Senedd Cymru – Welsh Parliament: Cardiff West
- Councillors: 1 (Cardiff Council)

Radyr is an electoral ward (sometimes known as Radyr and Morganstown) in the northwest of the city of Cardiff, Wales. It is coterminous with the community of Radyr and Morganstown which as the name suggests includes the villages of Radyr and Morganstown.

According to the 2011 UK Census the population of the ward was 6,417.

== Background ==
The Radyr ward was created in 1999 following The City and County of Cardiff (Electoral Arrangements) Order 1998, coming into effect with the county council elections in 1999. Prior to this, Radyr had been joined with St Fagans as part of a Radyr and St Fagans ward, which had been created in 1982.

== Community Council ==
For the purposes of elections to Radyr and Morganstown Community Council, the ward is divided into three community wards of Morganstown, Radyr North and Radyr South, which elect a total of twelve community councillors.

== County council elections ==
The Radyr ward elects one county councillor to the City of Cardiff Council. Between 1999 and 2008 the ward was represented by Labour Party councillor, Marion Drake. At the 2008 council elections the ward was won by Rod McKerlich for the Conservative Party.

2017 Cardiff Council election
| Party | Candidate | Votes | % | ±% |
|---|---|---|---|---|
| Conservative | Roderick McKerlich * | 1,193 | 43% | −10% |
| Plaid Cymru | Michael Andrew Christopher Deem | 999 | 36% | +29% |
| Labour | Mohammed Rafiqul Islam | 358 | 13% | −19% |
| Liberal Democrats | Hilary Elizabeth Borrow | 218 | 8% | +4% |

2012 Cardiff Council election
| Party | Candidate | Votes | % | ±% |
|---|---|---|---|---|
| Conservative | Roderick McKerlich * | 1,215 | 53% | −7% |
| Labour | Moray Grant | 738 | 32% | +12% |
| Plaid Cymru | Ian Hughes | 164 | 7% | −3% |
| Liberal Democrats | Laura Pearcy | 95 | 4% | −7% |
| Green | Zabelle Aslanyan | 68 | 3% | +3% |
