= Propel (political party) =

Welsh political party

- Chair: Vacant as of January 2022
- Leader: Neil McEvoy
- Founded: 15 January 2020; 6 years ago
- Split from: Plaid Cymru
- Headquarters: 321 Cowbridge Road East; Canton; Cardiff; CF5 1JD
- Ideology: Welsh nationalism; Welsh independence
- Political position: Big-tent
- Colours: Green, white, and red
- Slogan: Not politics as usual
- Senedd: 0 / 96
- Local government in Wales: 1 / 1,254

Website
- propel.wales www.propel.cymru

Propel (formerly the Welsh National Party and later Welsh Nation Party) is a sovereignist and Welsh nationalist political party in Wales which advocates Welsh independence from the United Kingdom. The party was formed in early 2020 by its current leader Neil McEvoy. Propel currently has one county councillor in Wales.

== History ==
In 2018, Neil McEvoy started a pressure group called 'Propel Wales' and officially launched the group at a meeting in the Cardiff Coal Exchange on 21 May 2018. McEvoy, sitting as an independent AM at the time due to his expulsion from Plaid Cymru in March 2018, stated that while Propel Wales was 'within Plaid Cymru', it sought to reach out to those outside of Plaid Cymru and to people who were disengaged with Welsh politics altogether.

On 10 July 2019, McEvoy withdrew his application to re-join Plaid Cymru, citing an "absence of natural justice" and "due process" as the reason behind his decision. By late 2019, Propel Wales had changed their description from 'members and supporters of Plaid Cymru' to 'without ties to any political party'.

On 23 October 2019, Cardiff Council's three remaining Plaid Cymru councillors resigned the party's whip, accusing the party of becoming "too close to Labour." McEvoy also sat as a Plaid Cymru councillor for the Fairwater ward prior to his expulsion from that party.

The Welsh National Party was registered with the Electoral Commission on 15 January 2020. On 7 February, McEvoy confirmed to Nation.Cymru that the party had been registered and said that "exciting news will follow in the near future." In an interview with ITV Wales' political editor, Adrian Masters, McEvoy said that the party aimed to "offer an alternative to Labour and Plaid Cymru" and "shake up the status quo." He described the party as being 'sovereignist', which he says is about 'more than just national independence'. He stated that the party would field candidates in the 2021 Senedd election and confirmed that he would challenge the First Minister, Mark Drakeford, in his Cardiff West constituency. McEvoy came a close second in Cardiff West at the 2016 National Assembly election as a Plaid Cymru candidate, reducing Drakeford's majority from 21.3% in 2011 to 3.7%.

In February 2020, the WNP gained its first local government representation when McEvoy and his three former Plaid Cymru colleagues on Cardiff Council announced that they would form a Welsh National Party group. Cllr Keith Parry was chosen to lead the group, stating that the group would focus on promoting "individual, community and national sovereignty for Wales" as well as "putting forward positive proposals for sorting the housing crisis, tackling corruption and ending severe poverty in our city." On 30 March 2020, Cllr Martyn Peters, councillor for the Dyffryn ward on Neath Port Talbot Council, left Plaid Cymru and joined the Welsh National Party, stating that he believed that "this nation needs fresh new thinking to take it forward." On 30 April 2020, the WNP gained its first councillor in North Wales after Cllr Dylan Bullard, an independent councillor for the Pwllheli North ward on Gwynedd Council, announced that he was joining the party. McEvoy welcomed the news of Bullard's defection, saying that "with the addition of Dylan to our team we are demonstrating that the WNP truly is a national party for Wales." On 13 May 2020, Cllr Peter Read, councillor for the Abererch ward, left Plaid Cymru and joined Bullard to sit as the WNP's second councillor on Gwynedd Council. Both councillors cited opposition to elements of Gwynedd Council's Local Development Plan as motivating factors in their defections and as a key focus of their new group.

The party was scheduled to hold its official launch on 3 April 2020 at the Cardiff Marriott Hotel, but this was postponed due to the COVID-19 pandemic.

The Electoral Commission rejected the name Welsh Nation Party in January 2021, having previously rejected the name Welsh National Party as well, saying that the official Welsh translation of the name was "confusingly similar to another already registered party [Plaid Cymru]". McEvoy stated he would instead seek to register the name Propel, a name which was accepted by the Electoral Commission in March 2021.

Propel put forward 10 constituency candidates in the 2021 Senedd election as well contesting each regional list seat. It was not a successful night for the new party as they registered less than 1% of the vote nationwide and lost a number of deposits. McEvoy achieved their best result on the night, accruing 9.5% of the vote in Cardiff West, finishing 4th behind Plaid Cymru, the Conservative Party and the victorious Mark Drakeford of the Labour Party. In the 2022 Cardiff Council election, two of the three councillors lost their seats, leaving McEvoy as the only councillor.

McEvoy was Propel's sole candidate at the 2024 general election, polling 1,041 votes (2.3%) in Cardiff West.

Propel stood 4 candidates, including McEvoy and his wife, across Cardiff's two 6-member seats in the 2026 Senedd election. The party polled 4,032 votes (0.32%).

== Policies ==
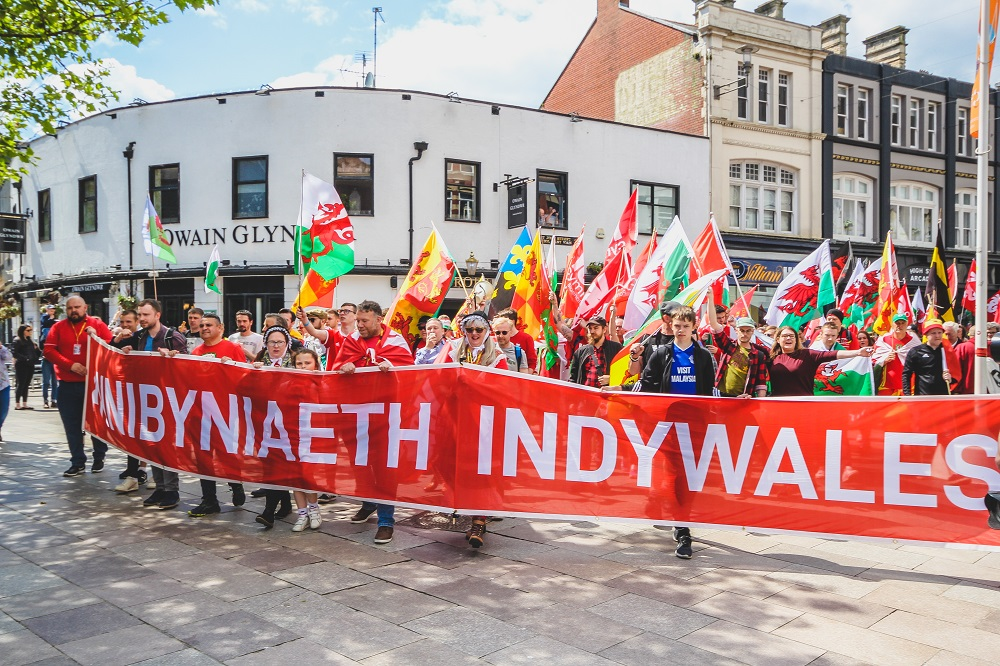
Propel Leader Neil McEvoy at the AUOB Cymru March for Independence in Cardiff, 11 May 2019

The party is explicitly Welsh nationalist and advocates Welsh independence from the United Kingdom. On 22 October 2019, Neil McEvoy (then sitting as an independent AM) introduced a motion calling for a referendum on 'Welsh national sovereignty'. This was the first time that a Welsh legislature had voted on the proposal for a Welsh independence referendum. The motion was defeated by 8 votes to 43, with even some Plaid Cymru AMs failing to support the motion, despite it being official Plaid Cymru policy to hold an independence referendum.

The party's platform is built around the principles of individual sovereignty, community sovereignty and national sovereignty. The party released a statement of their principles on their website, with much of it derived from the earlier 'Propel Wales Statement'.

In the statement, the party advocates for:

- Natural justice, due process and free speech to be enshrined in a Welsh constitution and bill of rights.
- The right of communities to influence local policy through referendums.
- The decentralisation of decision making to a community level.
- Making 'actions that would lessen national sovereignty' subject to a national referendum.
- A just and fair market economy.
- The elimination of severe poverty in Wales.
- Tackling corruption, nepotism and corporate lobbying and money in politics.
- Breaking up monopolies.
- A welfare state which acts as a 'strong safety net'.
- The sustainable reindustrialisation of Wales

Propel has also expressed a strongly anti-nuclear stance, particularly in relation to the dumping of dredged mud from Hinkley Point in Somerset off the coast of Cardiff. Anti-nuclear campaigners have raised fears that dredging the seabed near the site of the new Hinckley Point C nuclear power station could be churning up contamination from the old Hinkley Point A and Hinckley Point B nuclear reactors and in turn meaning that contaminated mud is being dumped along the Cardiff coastline. McEvoy has been a long-term critic of the plans.

Propel and Neil McEvoy have also expressed opposition to transgender rights, such as gender self-identification and access to gender-affirming care for minors, as well as to 20 mph roads.

== Leadership ==
#	Name	Portrait	Took office	Left office
1	Neil McEvoy (b. 1970)		15 January 2020	Incumbent

== Name controversy ==
In February 2020, the Electoral Commission decided that the party could not use the Welsh name Plaid Genedlaethol Cymru, on the grounds that it was too similar to Plaid Cymru, but accepted the registration of the English-language name Welsh National Party. In response, McEvoy stated that "we will be known as Plaid Genedlaethol Cymru in our national language, whatever appears on a ballot paper."

On 1 May 2020, it was reported that Plaid Cymru was preparing to take the Electoral Commission to court over its decision to allow McEvoy to register the English name Welsh National Party. Plaid Cymru had been formed in 1925 as Plaid Genedlaethol Cymru (English: 'The National Party of Wales'), but the party had abandoned this name at some point in the 1940s in favour of using Plaid Cymru (English: The Party of Wales) and was often referred to as 'The Welsh Party' in party literature of the time.

On 6 May 2020, following the threat of legal action from Plaid Cymru, the Electoral Commission removed the Welsh National Party from the register of political parties, so that a second application to register a name would need to be made. In response, McEvoy described the decision as representing "a shameful day for democracy" and said that the party was seeking 'urgent legal advice' as well as a statement from the Speaker's Committee on the Electoral Commission, which oversees the Electoral Commission.

In November 2020, McEvoy announced plans to rebrand the party as the Welsh Nation Party ahead of the 2021 elections. This rebranding had already taken place on the party's official website, "wnp.wales".

In January 2021, the Electoral Commission rejected the new name, saying it was "confusingly similar to another already registered party Plaid Cymru", and McEvoy stated he would seek to register the name Propel instead.

In March 2021, the Electoral Commission accepted the application to register the name Propel, to be used in both Welsh and English. The application included a Welsh dragon and a silhouette map of Wales as the party's symbols, together with four descriptions: "Neil McEvoy Propel", "Propel: Better for Wales / Propel: Gwell i Gymru", "Propel: Wales Needs Champions / Propel: Mae Cymru Angen Pencampwyr", and "Propel: Not Politics as Usual / Propel: Nid Gwleidyddiaeth fel Arfer".

== Leader controversy ==
On 2 December 2020, McEvoy was excluded from Senedd proceedings for 21 calendar days, was barred from Senedd buildings and had his pay docked after a Senedd Committee found him to have breached Senedd rules following an altercation with Labour MS Mick Antoniw where McEvoy behaved in a threatening manner and employed physical and verbal aggression to do so.

== Elected members ==
Local Authorities in Wales
Local Authority	Seats
Cardiff Council	1 / 79

== Electoral performance ==
=== Senedd ===
Election	Constituency			Regional			Votes	%	Total seats	+/–	Government
Election	Votes	%	Seats	Votes	%	Seats	Votes	%	Total seats	+/–	Government
2021	9,825	0.9%	0 / 20	8,864	0.8%	0 / 40			0 / 60		Extraparliamentary
2026 (Note: Starting with the 2026 election, the Senedd was increased to 96 members who are all elected through closed list proportional representation (using the D'Hondt method) in sixteen six-member constituencies)							4,032	0.32	0 / 96	Steady	Extraparliamentary

=== House of Commons ===
Year	Number of seats contested		Cardiff West Result		Overall seats	Change
2024	3.1%	1 / 32	1,041 votes	2.3%	0 / 32	New Party
