= Co-operation between the Green Party and Plaid Cymru =

Party collaboration in Welsh politics

Plaid Cymru and the Green Party of England and Wales have a history of collaborative working, including running candidates together, under the names of both parties. The parties have done this at a number of different elections, including to successfully elect an MP, Cynog Dafis, at the 1992 general election.

While the United Kingdom was part of the European Union, the two parties sat as part of the same European political group, the Greens–European Free Alliance.

== History of Collaboration between the parties ==
Cynog Dafis documented the history of co-operation between the parties leading up to the 1992 general election at which the parties ran joint candidates, in a speech delivered in Welsh entitled 'Plaid Cymru a'r Gwyrddiaid: Tân siafins neu wers ir dyfodol' (English: Plaid Cymru and the Greens: A flash in the pan or a lesson for the future) as the 2005 Welsh Political Archive annual lecture.

== Joint Electoral Results ==
=== UK Parliament ===
==== 1991 Monmouth By-election ====
At the 1991 Monmouth by-election, following the death of Monmouth MP John Stradling Thomas, Plaid Cymru and the Green party put forth a joint candidate - Melvin Witherden. Witherden came fifth and received 0.6% of the vote.

==== 1992 General Election ====
| Candidate | Primary Party | Constituency | Votes | Vote % | Elected |
|---|---|---|---|---|---|
| Cynog Dafis | Plaid Cymru | Ceredigion and Pembroke North | 16,020 | 30.3 | Yes |
| Alun Davies (Note: Ran under the name Thomas Davies) | Plaid Cymru | Blaenau Gwent | 2,099 | 4.8% | No |
| Helen Mary Jones | Plaid Cymru | Islwyn | 1,606 | 3.9% | No |
| John Cox | Unknown | Torfaen | 1,210 | 2.6% | No |
| Stephen M. Ainley | Unknown | Newport East | 716 | 1.7% | No |
| Peter Keelan | Plaid Cymru | Newport West | 653 | 1.4% | No |
| Melvin Witherden | Green | Monmouth | 431 | 0.6% | No |

Joint Green-Plaid candidates stood in seven seats at the 1992 General Election, Blaenau Gwent, Ceredigion and Pembroke North, Islwyn, Monmouth, Newport West, Newport East and Torfaen.

In Ceredigion and Pembroke North, Cynog Dafis of Plaid Cymru was elected as a joint Plaid-Green MP, with a 14.1% increase on his vote at the previous election. He had contested the constituency at the two previous general elections as a Plaid Candidate, and had been unsuccessful. He sat as a joint Green-Plaid MP until the 1997 general election, when he was re-elected as the MP for the Ceredigion constituency, but only under the Plaid Cymru banner. Dafis would later describe himself as a 'hybrid' and say that Caroline Lucas was the Green Party's first MP.

In Blaenau Gwent, Alun Davies received 2,099 votes, which represented 4.8% of the vote. Davies would later become a notable member of the Welsh Labour party, serving as Member of the Senedd for Blaenau Gwent having also served as a member for Mid and West Wales. In Islwyn, Helen Mary Jones contested the constituency on the joint ticket. She received 3.9% of the vote. Jones would later be elected to the Senedd as a Plaid Cymru MS for Llanelli and Mid and West Wales from 1999-2011 and again from 2018-2021.

Melvin Witherden of the Green Party stood again for the Monmouth constituency at the 1992 general election, receiving 0.8% of the vote. He had previously stood for the Green party in the Torfaen constituency at the 1987 general election. In Newport West, Plaid Cymru's Peter Keelan stood on the common ticket, and received 653 votes, and 1.4% of the vote. In Newport East, Stephen Ainley received 716 votes and 1.7% of the vote. John Cox contested Torfaen, and won 1,210 votes, representing 2.6% of voters.

=== Local Elections ===
==== Cardiff ====
Joint Plaid-Green candidates contested the 2022 Cardiff Council elections under the jointly registered 'Common Ground Alliance' name. Two councillors were successfully elected.

== Common Ground Alliance ==
Common Ground Alliance
- Founded: September 2021
- Merger of: Plaid Cymru (Cardiff); Wales Green Party (Cardiff)
- Cardiff Council: 2 / 79

In September 2021, Plaid Cymru and the Green Party announced an electoral pact for Cardiff Council elections into the future, which would see the two parties run a joint slate of candidates. Neither party had sitting councillors: Plaid Cymru's councillors elected in 2017 had been either expelled or had quit the party. In the election, the two parties fielded a common slate of candidates, known as the Common Ground Alliance. Of the 70 Common Ground Alliance candidates, 46 were from Plaid Cymru with the remaining 24 from the Green Party. The alliance's campaign was formally launched on 24 April 2022.

=== 2022 Campaign ===
The Alliance published one joint manifesto entitled "Manifesto for Cardiff 2022: A City for Communities, A City for Culture, A City that Cares". It promised improvements to transport in the city, with "20 minute communities", a faster council housing building programme, an Independent chair for the Planning Committee and other measures to make the planning process more independent.

In the election, Common Ground won 17% of votes across the city, coming third behind Labour and the Conservatives. They won two seats, both in the Pentyrch and St Fagans ward. The Alliance's elected councillors are Andrea Gibson and Rhys Owain Livesy.

== Co-operation in the Senedd ==
=== Government of Rhun ap Iowerth ===
In the 7th Senedd, the Green Party's two Senedd members voted for Rhun ap Iorwerth as First Minister of Wales. Anthony Slaughter also seconded Plaid Cymru's nomination for Dirprwy Lywydd (Deputy Presiding Officer), Kerry Ferguson.

== Policy Collaboration ==
In 2022, Plaid Cymru and the Wales Green Party, a semi-autonomous component of the Green Party of England and Wales, jointly created the Future Cymru Forum, to focus on developing policy on six economic topics. The co-operation was announced at Plaid Cymru's 2022 Conference, by leader Adam Price.

== See also ==
- Liberal Democrat–Green Party alliance
