= 1971 Cardiff City Council election =

Local election in Cardiff, Wales

The 1971 Cardiff City Council election was held on Thursday 13 May 1971 to elect councillors to Cardiff City Council in Cardiff, Glamorgan, Wales. It took place on the same day as several other county borough elections in Wales and England.

The previous elections to this one were in May 1970 and the next elections would be in May 1972. The 1971 election would be the penultimate all-Cardiff election before the dissolution of the unitary authority and the creation of the new second-tier district authority of Cardiff City Council in 1974.

The election saw the Labour Party taking a significant number of seats back from the Conservatives.

== Background ==
Cardiff County Borough Council had been created in 1889. Cardiff became a city in 1905. Elections to the local authority were held annually, though not all council seats were included in each contest, because each of the three councillors in each ward stood down for election in rotation. The councillors elected in 1971 would serve for less than three years, before the dissolution of the present Council in April 1974.

The local government elections took place in the context of Edward Heath's new Conservative UK government (which had been elected only 11 months previously) and rising prices and unemployment.

== Overview of the result ==
Nineteen seats in 19 electoral wards were up for election in May 1971. In what was described as a "night of disaster for the Conservatives" the Labour Party more than recovered the position they had been in Cardiff prior to the 1967 elections. Labour gained a total of 11 seats, including one in the previous Tory stronghold of Whitchurch. A number of former Cardiff Labour councillors won their seats back, including Eva Davies, Emyr Currie-Jones, Philip Dunleavy, Harold Bartlett and Dengar Evans.

=== Council composition ===
Following the May 1970 election the balance on the city council was 57 Conservatives, 18 Labour and one Plaid Cymru. With 11 out of 19 seats changing hands in May 1971, Cardiff Labour chairman Cllr Jack Brooks called for the other two thirds of Cardiff seats to be put up for election, saying it was unfair that the Conservatives should remain in control.

== Ward results ==
Contests took place in every ward at this election.

=== Adamsdown ===
Adamsdown ward 1971
Party	Candidate	Votes	%	±%
Labour	Eva Davies	1,706		
Conservative	Christopher Matthew Peterson *	663		
Liberal	Henry Charles Edwards	153		
Majority		1,043		
Labour gain from Conservative		Swing		

=== Canton ===
Canton ward 1971
Party	Candidate	Votes	%	±%
Labour	Dengar Robinson Evans	1,807		
Conservative	Anthea Jean Thomas *	1,294		
Liberal	Richard Michael James	205		
Majority		513		
Labour gain from Conservative		Swing		

=== Cathays ===
Cathays ward 1971
Party	Candidate	Votes	%	±%
Labour	Emyr Currie-Jones	2,730		
Conservative	Hubert George Nunn *	1,726		
Majority		1,004		
Labour gain from Conservative		Swing		

=== Central ===
Central ward 1971
Party	Candidate	Votes	%	±%
Labour	Gordon William Fish	1,563		
Conservative	William Lawford Gower *	1,118		
Majority		445		
Labour gain from Conservative		Swing		

=== Ely ===
Ely ward 1971
Party	Candidate	Votes	%	±%
Labour	Albert William Buttle *	3,376		
Conservative	Leslie Albert Roderick	770		
Plaid Cymru	Charles Stephen Craves	598		
Majority		2,606		
Labour hold		Swing		

=== Gabalfa ===
Gabalfa ward 1971
Party	Candidate	Votes	%	±%
Labour	Arthur William George Brown	2,290		
Conservative	Bernard Hugh Rees	1,243		
Independent Labour	Gertrude Louise Baines	688		
Liberal	Alan Edward Hiscock	170		
Majority		1,047		
Labour gain from Conservative		Swing		

=== Grangetown ===
Grangetown ward 1971
Party	Candidate	Votes	%	±%
Labour	Harold George Bartlett	1,750		
Conservative	Tim Cronin *	987		
Plaid Cymru	Peter Staveley McMullen	324		
Majority		763		
Labour gain from Conservative		Swing		

=== Llanishen ===
Llanishen ward 1971
Party	Candidate	Votes	%	±%
Conservative	Henry Peter Farthing *	2,447		
Labour	Leslie Bernard Goodrum	2,108		
Liberal	Olive Mary Langdon	905		
Majority		339		
Conservative hold		Swing		

=== Llandaff ===
Llandaff ward 1971
Party	Candidate	Votes	%	±%
Conservative	Beti Jones *	2,128		
Labour	Lionel John James	813		
Plaid Cymru	Gwen Humphreys	724		
Majority		1,315		
Conservative hold		Swing		

=== Penylan ===
Penylan ward 1971
Party	Candidate	Votes	%	±%
Conservative	William Vaughan Barraby	3,674		
Labour	George Ewart Baylis	1,386		
Liberal	John Evan Lee	536		
Majority		2,288		
Conservative hold		Swing		

=== Plasmawr ===
Plasmawr ward 1971
Party	Candidate	Votes	%	±%
Labour	Albert Arthur Huish	2,909		
Plaid Cymru	David Eurig Davies	1,329		
Conservative	Doreen Muriel Norman *	1,032		
Majority		1,580		
Labour gain from Conservative		Swing		

=== Plasnewydd ===
Plasnewydd ward 1971
Party	Candidate	Votes	%	±%
Conservative	Tony Lewis *	1,554		
Labour	Michael John Parry	1,429		
Plaid Cymru	Philip Brian Richards	312		
Liberal	Elizabeth Davina Forrest	158		
Majority		125		
Conservative hold		Swing		

=== Rhiwbina ===
Rhiwbina ward 1971
Party	Candidate	Votes	%	±%
Conservative	William Davies *	2,269		
Labour	William Michael Walker	1,155		
Plaid Cymru	Gwynfor Hughes	676		
Majority		1,114		
Conservative hold		Swing		

=== Riverside ===
Riverside ward 1971
Party	Candidate	Votes	%	±%
Conservative	Joseph Donovan *	1,271		
Labour	Thomas Clifford Lee	1,019		
Plaid Cymru	Roy Adam Lee	326		
Majority		252		
Conservative hold		Swing		

=== Roath ===
Roath ward 1971
Party	Candidate	Votes	%	±%
Conservative	Ian Hermer *	2,257		
Labour	John Scrivens	945		
Majority		1,312		
Conservative hold		Swing		

=== Rumney ===
Rumney ward 1971
Party	Candidate	Votes	%	±%
Labour	David Myfr Evans	3,895		
Conservative	Samuel Parker *	1,593		
Plaid Cymru	Michael Coughlin	433		
Majority		2,302		
Labour gain from Conservative		Swing		

=== South ===
South ward 1971
Party	Candidate	Votes	%	±%
Labour	Philip Dunleavy	2,165		
Conservative	Stefan Terlezki *	1,198		
Majority		167		
Labour gain from Conservative		Swing		

=== Splott ===
Splott ward 1971
Party	Candidate	Votes	%	±%
Labour	John Edward Brooks	2,600		
Conservative	Robert Edward Glover	1,342		
Communist	Richard Horatio Spencer	59		
Majority		258		
Labour gain from Conservative		Swing		

=== Whitchurch ===
Whitchurch ward 1971
Party	Candidate	Votes	%	±%
Labour	Henry Gordon Howell	2,100		
Conservative	Victor Riley	2,024		
Liberal	Alexander Thomas Reeves	316		
Plaid Cymru	David Gareth Williams	247		
Majority		76		
Labour gain from Conservative		Swing		

* = 'retiring' ward councillor for re-election

== See also ==
- 1973 Cardiff City Council election
