= 1972 Cardiff City Council election =

Local election in Cardiff, Wales

The 1972 Cardiff City Council election was held on Thursday 4 May 1972 to elect councillors to Cardiff City Council in Cardiff, Glamorgan, Wales. It took place on the same day as several other county borough elections in Wales and England.

The previous elections to this one were in May 1971. The 1972 election would be the final all-Cardiff election to this council before the dissolution of the unitary authority and the creation of the new second-tier district authority of Cardiff City Council in 1974.

The election saw the Labour Party taking a significant number of seats, to cut the Conservative Party majority.

== Background ==
Cardiff County Borough Council had been created in 1889. Cardiff became a city in 1905. Elections to the local authority were held annually, though not all council seats were included in each contest, because each of the three councillors in each ward stood down for election in rotation. The councillors elected in 1972 would only serve for less two years, before the dissolution of the Council in April 1974.

There were a total of 76 seats on the council, including 19 aldermen.

== Overview of the result ==
Nineteen seats in 19 electoral wards were up for election in May 1972. The Labour Party won an additional ten seats on the council, mainly from the ruling Conservative Party, cutting the Tory majority to 12. One of the gains was in the Whitchurch ward, which until last year had been a Tory stronghold.

== Ward results ==
Contests for one ward councillor seat took place in each of the nineteen wards at this election.

=== Adamsdown ===
Adamsdown ward 1972
Party	Candidate	Votes	%	±%
Labour	John Iorwerth Jones *	1,316		
Conservative	Christopher Paterson	391		
Independent	Thelma Mackie	57		
Majority		925		
Labour hold		Swing		

=== Canton ===
Canton ward 1972
Party	Candidate	Votes	%	±%
Labour	George E. Bayliss	1,396		
Conservative	William Albert J. Adams *	1,316		
Majority		80		
Labour gain from Conservative		Swing		

=== Cathays ===
Cathays ward 1972
Party	Candidate	Votes	%	±%
Labour	Derek Allinson	1,988		
Conservative	David John Evans *	1,587		
Plaid Cymru	Gareth Ap Sion	430		
People's Candidate	Morris W. Bradshaw	165		
Majority		401		
Labour gain from Conservative		Swing		

=== Central ===
Central ward 1972
Party	Candidate	Votes	%	±%
Labour	John D. Leonard *	1,535		
Conservative	Bernard H. Rees	932		
Majority		603		
Labour hold		Swing		

=== Ely ===
Ely ward 1972
Party	Candidate	Votes	%	±%
Labour	Thomas Clifford Lee	2,674		
Conservative	John F. G. Phillips *	775		
Plaid Cymru	Charles Stephen Cravos	524		
Majority		1,899		
Labour gain from Conservative		Swing		

=== Gabalfa ===
Gabalfa ward 1972
Party	Candidate	Votes	%	±%
Labour	Michael Jn. Parry	2,290		
Conservative	Gwilym Haydn Jones *	1,405		
Majority		885		
Labour gain from Conservative		Swing		

=== Grangetown ===
Grangetown ward 1972
Party	Candidate	Votes	%	±%
Labour	(Mrs) E. M. Matthewson	1,543		
Conservative	Lawrence Charles Johnson *	876		
Majority		667		
Labour gain from Conservative		Swing		

=== Llandaff ===
Llandaff ward 1972
Party	Candidate	Votes	%	±%
Conservative	Keith Flynn *	2,041		
Labour	Carys Meinir Evans	727		
Plaid Cymru	Gwen Humphreys	614		
Majority		1,314		
Conservative hold		Swing		

=== Llanishen ===
Llanishen ward 1972
Party	Candidate	Votes	%	±%
Conservative	Jeffrey P. Sainsbury *	2,579		
Labour	Leslie Bernard Goodrum	2,131		
Liberal	Olive Mary Langdon	924		
Majority		448		
Conservative hold		Swing		

=== Penylan ===
Penylan ward 1972
Party	Candidate	Votes	%	±%
Conservative	Stefan Terlezki	4,087		
Labour	Violet Jones	2,007		
Majority		2,080		
Conservative hold		Swing		

=== Plasmawr ===
Plasmawr ward 1972
Party	Candidate	Votes	%	±%
Labour	Fred George Tyrrell	2,385		
Plaid Cymru	(Dr) Dafydd Hughes*	1,584		
Conservative	Doreen Muriel Norman	859		
Majority		801		
Labour gain from Plaid Cymru		Swing		

=== Plasnewydd ===
Plasnewydd ward 1972
Party	Candidate	Votes	%	±%
Conservative	Geoffrey Donald Edmunds *	1,489		
Labour	Patrick Joseph Troy	1,361		
Plaid Cymru	Philip Brian Richards	431		
Liberal	Henry Charles Edwards	358		
Majority		128		
Conservative hold		Swing		

=== Rhiwbina ===
Rhiwbina ward 1972
Party	Candidate	Votes	%	±%
Conservative	William John A. Bain *	2,145		
Plaid Cymru	H. Lloyd Davies	964		
Liberal	Howard John O'Brien	803		
Labour	Mervyn G. Powell-Davies	785		
Majority		1,191		
Conservative hold		Swing		

=== Riverside ===
Riverside ward 1972
Party	Candidate	Votes	%	±%
Conservative	Alec Johnson *	1,219		
Labour	John A. Hennessey	1,013		
Plaid Cymru	Roy A. Lee	315		
Liberal	Richard M. James	131		
Majority		206		
Conservative hold		Swing		

=== Roath ===
Roath ward 1972
Party	Candidate	Votes	%	±%
Conservative	Gerald Michael Brinks *	2,093		
Labour	Fred Hodges	802		
Plaid Cymru	Paul Anthony Cravos	379		
Majority		1,291		
Conservative hold		Swing		

=== Rumney ===
Rumney ward 1972
Party	Candidate	Votes	%	±%
Labour	John Randall Phillips	3,122		
Conservative	David Howard Burnett	1,071		
Independent	(Dr) Bryan Sandford-Hill *	514		
Majority		2,051		
Labour gain from Independent		Swing		

=== South ===
South ward 1972
Party	Candidate	Votes	%	±%
Labour	Frederick John Smith	2,011		
Conservative	David Stanley Cooper *	779		
Majority		1,232		
Labour gain from Conservative		Swing		

=== Splott ===
Splott ward 1972
Party	Candidate	Votes	%	±%
Labour	Dermot R. Ormond	2,239		
Conservative	Cyril Frederick Hutchings *	1,128		
Communist	Stella Garrett Jones	94		
Majority		1,111		
Labour gain from Conservative		Swing		

=== Whitchurch ===
Whitchurch ward 1972
Party	Candidate	Votes	%	±%
Labour	Philip Norton	2,569		
Conservative	John Meurig Davies *	2,399		
Majority		170		
Labour gain from Conservative		Swing		

* = 'retiring' ward councillor for re-election

== See also ==
- 1973 Cardiff City Council election
