= 1973 Cardiff City Council election =

Local election in Cardiff, Wales

The 1973 Cardiff City Council election was held on Thursday 10 May 1973 to elect councillors to the new Cardiff District Council (later to become known as Cardiff City Council) in Cardiff, Wales. It took place on the same day as other district council elections in the United Kingdom.

These were the first elections to the new district council, which would come into effect on 1 April 1974. The previous all-Cardiff elections to the old Cardiff City Council took place in May 1972. Future elections would take place every three years, with the next election scheduled for 6 May 1976.

The 1973 election saw the Labour Party win a significant majority on the Council.

== Background ==
Previously a unitary authority from 1889, Cardiff's council was to become a second-tier district authority to South Glamorgan County Council from 1 April 1974. This followed local government reorganisation enacted by the Local Government Act 1972. The 1973 election was the first to the new local authority, with councillors acting in a shadow capacity until April 1974. The election to South Glamorgan County Council had taken place in April 1973, with many Cardiff councillors standing for election to this authority.

Until 1973, elections to Cardiff City Council had been annual, with each of the three ward councillors standing down for election in rotation. In May 1973 all ward councillors were elected at the same election, to sit for three years.

== Wards ==
The wards to the new council remained the same in 1973 as the previous Cardiff City Council, but with the addition of two new wards: Lisvane, Llanedeyrn and St Mellons (1 seat); and Radyr, St Fagans, Tongwynlais (2 seats). Fourteen of the wards continued to have three councillors, but five wards had their representation doubled to six councillors.

The position of alderman was to be abolished, with all members of the new council being elected ward councillors.

== Results ==
Contests took place in all except one of the wards at this election.^{(a)} Labour won control of the new council.

Cardiff District Council election result 1973
Party	Seats	Gains	Losses	Net gain/loss	Seats %	Votes %	Votes	+/−
Labour	42	42	N/A	N/A	56.0			N/A
Conservative	33	33	N/A	N/A	44.0			N/A
Liberal	0	0	N/A	N/A	0.0			N/A
Plaid Cymru	0	0	N/A	N/A	0.0		5,566	N/A
Communist	0	0	N/A	N/A	0.0		186	N/A
Independent	0	0	N/A	N/A	0.0		91	N/A

== Results by ward ==
=== Adamsdown (3 seats) ===
Adamsdown
Party	Candidate	Votes	%	±%
Labour	D Evans ^{+}	1,139	74.2	N/A
Labour	John Iorwerth Jones ^{o+}	1,102		
Labour	R Costley	1,046		
Conservative	E Canning	306	19.9	N/A
Independent	Thelma Mackie	91	5.9	N/A
Turnout			25.3	N/A
Registered electors		6,071		
Labour win (new seat)				
Labour win (new seat)				
Labour win (new seat)				

=== Canton (3 seats) ===
Canton
Party	Candidate	Votes	%	±%
Labour	N. Jenkins	1,343	50.4	N/A
Conservative	Bella Brown ^{A+}	1,323	49.6	N/A
Labour	P. W. Thomas	1,299		
Labour	Patrick Kitson	1,283		
Conservative	Trevor Tyrell ^{o+}	1,230		
Conservative	W. Adams	1,171		
Turnout			34.8	N/A
Registered electors		7,653		
Labour win (new seat)				
Conservative win (new seat)				
Labour win (new seat)				

=== Cathays (3 seats) ===
Cathays
Party	Candidate	Votes	%	±%
Labour	Derek Allinson ^{o+}	1,721	44.6	N/A
Labour	John Charles Edwards ^{o+}	1,581		
Labour	W. J. Davies	1,525		
Conservative	I. Jones	1,049	27.2	N/A
Conservative	J. G. Miles	891		
Conservative	M. P. Rivlin	851		
Liberal	H. C. Edwards	620	16.1	N/A
Plaid Cymru	G. ap Sion	466	12.1	N/A
Turnout			39.5	N/A
Registered electors		9,752		
Labour win (new seat)				
Labour win (new seat)				
Labour win (new seat)				

=== Central (3 seats) ===
Central
Party	Candidate	Votes	%	±%
Labour	William Herbert ^{o+}	1,217	62.2	N/A
Labour	Gordon William Fish ^{o+}	1,209		
Labour	David Seligman ^{+}	1,119		
Conservative	L. A. Walters	741	37.8	N/A
Turnout			33.4	N/A
Registered electors		5,864		
Labour win (new seat)				
Labour win (new seat)				
Labour win (new seat)				

=== Ely (6 seats) ===
Ely
Party	Candidate	Votes	%	±%
Labour	William Carling ^{o+}	2,362	67.3	N/A
Labour	Albert Buttle ^{o+}	2,314		
Labour	Reverend Robert H. Morgan ^{+}	2,243		
Labour	Charlie Gale	2,112		
Labour	J. Sloman	2,099		
Labour	Thomas Clifford Lee^{o+}	2,049		
Conservative	W. Clode	791	22.5	N/A
Conservative	A. Fitzpatrick	751		
Conservative	John F. C. Phillips	723		
Conservative	Joan Joshua	714		
Conservative	W. E. T. Jones	665		
Conservative	A. H. Hinder	654		
Plaid Cymru	G. Dowling	358	10.2	N/A
Plaid Cymru	P. Lane	325		
Plaid Cymru	Pedr McMullen	307		
Plaid Cymru	J. Storm	294		
Plaid Cymru	E. J. Maynard	201		
Turnout			24.2	N/A
Registered electors		14,526		
Labour win (new seat)				
Labour win (new seat)				
Labour win (new seat)				
Labour win (new seat)				
Labour win (new seat)				
Labour win (new seat)				

=== Gabalfa (3 seats) ===
Gabalfa
Party	Candidate	Votes	%	±%
Labour	Emrys Pride ^{o+}	1,647	66.2	N/A
Labour	Michael Parry ^{o+}	1,636		
Labour	Arthur Brown ^{o+}	1,590		
Conservative	R. C. Oldridge	842	33.8	N/A
Turnout			25.1	N/A
Registered electors		9,917		
Labour win (new seat)				
Labour win (new seat)				
Labour win (new seat)				

=== Grangetown (3 seats) ===
Grangetown
Party	Candidate	Votes	%	±%
Labour	M. Matthewson ^{o}	1,299	52.0	N/A
Labour	Harold Bartlett ^{o+}	1,273		
Labour	P. Owen	1,206		
Conservative	J. P. O'Reilly	1,198	48.0	N/A
Conservative	Gwendoline Judd	1,089		
Turnout			33.1	N/A
Registered electors		7,540		
Labour win (new seat)				
Labour win (new seat)				
Labour win (new seat)				

=== Lisvane, Llanedeyrn and St Mellons (1 seat) ===
Lisvane, Llanedeyrn and St Mellons
Party	Candidate	Votes	%	±%
Conservative	T. H. Davies	Unopposed		
Turnout		0	0.0	N/A
Registered electors		2,418		
Conservative win (new seat)				

=== Llandaff (3 seats) ===
Llandaff
Party	Candidate	Votes	%	±%
Conservative	H. Ferguson-Jones ^{A+}	1,834	59.0	N/A
Conservative	Keith Flynn ^{o}	1,759		
Conservative	Sir Charles S. Hallinan ^{A}	1,625		
Labour	Norma Maylin	650	20.9	N/A
Labour	A. Saunders	628		
Plaid Cymru	Anne-Marie Petty	623	20.1	N/A
Labour	J. D. Berridge	508		
Turnout			33.4	N/A
Registered electors		9,293		
Conservative win (new seat)				
Conservative win (new seat)				
Conservative win (new seat)				

=== Llanishen (6 seats) ===
Llanishen
Party	Candidate	Votes	%	±%
Conservative	Jeffrey Sainsbury ^{o+}	2,475	36.5	N/A
Conservative	Lionel Pugh ^{o+}	2,475		
Conservative	Ronald Watkiss ^{A+}	2,396		
Conservative	N. Morgan	2,360		
Conservative	D. O'Neill	2,332		
Conservative	William Barraby ^{o}	2,299		
Liberal	Olive Langdon	1,862	27.5	N/A
Labour	Mary Beasley	1,723	25.4	N/A
Labour	E. Goodrun	1,642		
Labour	F. Beatson	1,633		
Labour	M. Powell-Davies	1,618		
Labour	L. Goodrun	1,605		
Plaid Cymru	R. Griffiths	723	10.7	N/A
Turnout			49.7	N/A
Registered electors		13,635		
Conservative win (new seat)				
Conservative win (new seat)				
Conservative win (new seat)				
Conservative win (new seat)				
Conservative win (new seat)				
Conservative win (new seat)				

=== Penylan (6 seats) ===
Penylan
Party	Candidate	Votes	%	±%
Conservative	Stefan Terlezki ^{o+}	3,866	50.0	N/A
Conservative	G. A. S. Turnbull ^{Ao+}	3,628		
Conservative	L. Johnson	3,601		
Conservative	Cecil Rapport	3,540		
Conservative	A. Austin	3,490		
Conservative	A. Thomas	3,437		
Liberal	Joan Davies	2,573	33.3	N/A
Liberal	D. A. T. Thomas	2,510		
Liberal	M. Williams	2,450		
Liberal	Mary Jones	2,278		
Liberal	R. E. Westerman	2,193		
Liberal	A. Miranthis	2,190		
Labour	M. Davies	1,287	16.7	N/A
Labour	G. Jenkins	1,278		
Labour	R. Bent	1,255		
Labour	A. Jobbins	1,205		
Labour	B. Jones	1,174		
Labour	K. O'Brien	1,163		
Turnout			40.7	N/A
Registered electors		18,983		
Conservative win (new seat)				
Conservative win (new seat)				
Conservative win (new seat)				
Conservative win (new seat)				
Conservative win (new seat)				
Conservative win (new seat)				

=== Plasmawr (6 seats) ===
Plasmawr
Party	Candidate	Votes	%	±%
Labour	Hubert Harding ^{o+}	1,983	57.4	N/A
Labour	Frederick Tyrrell ^{o+}	1,886		
Labour	Albert Huish ^{o+}	1,823		
Labour	H. Davies	1,777		
Labour	J. Leondr	1,717		
Labour	E. West	1,643		
Conservative	W. Hall	863	25.0	N/A
Conservative	D. Norman	820		
Conservative	F. J. Jones	819		
Conservative	V. Lloyd	798		
Conservative	P. Baynham	770		
Plaid Cymru	S. Quick	608	17.6	N/A
Plaid Cymru	S. S. Smith	573		
Plaid Cymru	R. C. Rowlands	560		
Plaid Cymru	G. Aaron	526		
Plaid Cymru	W. D. Wilson	513		
Plaid Cymru	B. Nicholson	479		
Turnout			24.8	N/A
Registered electors		13,951		
Labour win (new seat)				
Labour win (new seat)				
Labour win (new seat)				
Labour win (new seat)				
Labour win (new seat)				
Labour win (new seat)				

=== Plasnewydd (3 seats) ===
Plasnewydd
Party	Candidate	Votes	%	±%
Conservative	Olwen Watkin ^{Ao+}	1,542	40.2	N/A
Conservative	S. James ^{+}	1,325		
Conservative	D. J. Evans	1,107		
Labour	P. Troy	986	25.7	N/A
Labour	A. Mills	924		
Labour	J. B. Cocks	879		
Plaid Cymru	Philip B. Richards	704	18.3	N/A
Liberal	R. Nott	605	15.8	
Plaid Cymru	Owen John Thomas	582		
Plaid Cymru	P. W. Riley	505		
Turnout			46.5	N/A
Registered electors		8,251		
Conservative win (new seat)				
Conservative win (new seat)				
Conservative win (new seat)				

=== Radyr, St Fagans, Tongwynlais (2 seats) ===
Radyr, St Fagans, Tongwynlais
Party	Candidate	Votes	%	±%
Conservative	L. B. Clarke	898	52.7	N/A
Conservative	G. W. Millard	838		
Labour	R. B. Hughes	806	47.3	N/A
Labour	G. Bailey	780		
Turnout			46.5	N/A
Registered electors		8,251		
Conservative win (new seat)				
Conservative win (new seat)				

=== Rhiwbina (3 seats) ===
Rhiwbina
Party	Candidate	Votes	%	±%
Conservative	William John A. Bain ^{o+}	1,912	40.7	N/A
Conservative	Martin Davies ^{o+}	1,877		
Conservative	G. Jones	1,785		
Liberal	H. J. O'Brien	1,519	32.3	N/A
Liberal	S. H. Cotsen	1,482		
Liberal	G. K. Davies	1,463		
Plaid Cymru	D. C. G. Davies	692	14.7	N/A
Plaid Cymru	Doris Hughes	652		
Labour	M. Mullins	577	12.3	N/A
Labour	B. Morris	556		
Labour	T. R. Morris	546		
Plaid Cymru	R. C. F. Williams	539		
Turnout			46.5	N/A
Registered electors		8,251		
Conservative win (new seat)				
Conservative win (new seat)				
Conservative win (new seat)				

=== Riverside (3 seats) ===
Riverside
Party	Candidate	Votes	%	±%
Conservative	K. Davies	1,530	47.7	N/A
Conservative	Alec Johnson ^{o}	1,323		
Conservative	S. Doxsey	1,235		
Labour	V. Jones	946	29.5	N/A
Labour	Dr. C. M. Hartnett	924		
Labour	V. A. White	858		
Liberal	E. Robinson	394	12.3	N/A
Plaid Cymru	R. A. Lee	337	10.5	N/A
Turnout			42.4	N/A
Registered electors		7,571		
Conservative win (new seat)				
Conservative win (new seat)				
Conservative win (new seat)				

=== Roath (3 seats) ===
Roath
Party	Candidate	Votes	%	±%
Conservative	N. Lloyd-Edwards	1,811	49.0	N/A
Conservative	Gerald Brinks ^{o}	1,639		
Conservative	C. Hutchings	1,636		
Liberal	D. W. Wood	929	25.2	N/A
Liberal	J. Beauchamp	773		
Liberal	J. S. Davies	762		
Labour	T. O'Callaghan	633	17.1	N/A
Plaid Cymru	P. Cravos	320	8.7	N/A
Turnout			35.8	N/A
Registered electors		10,317		
Conservative win (new seat)				
Conservative win (new seat)				
Conservative win (new seat)				

=== Rumney (6 seats) ===
Rumney
Party	Candidate	Votes	%	±%
Labour	Y. Bonar	2,653	52.7	N/A
Labour	David Myfr Evans ^{o+}	2,626		
Labour	F. Yeomans	2,551		
Labour	Alun Michael	2,520		
Labour	John Randall Phillips ^{o}	2,503		
Labour	John Reynolds	2,483		
Conservative	S. Parker	1,643	32.7	N/A
Conservative	S. Brown	1,491		
Conservative	T. R. Laurie	1,450		
Conservative	D. Floyd	1,428		
Conservative	H. R. James	1,398		
Plaid Cymru	S. R. Trevarthen	735	14.6	N/A
Turnout			26.7	N/A
Registered electors		18,837		
Labour win (new seat)				
Labour win (new seat)				
Labour win (new seat)				
Labour win (new seat)				
Labour win (new seat)				
Labour win (new seat)				

=== South (3 seats) ===
South
Party	Candidate	Votes	%	±%
Labour	Frederick John Smith ^{o+}	1,540	60.8	N/A
Labour	Philip Dunleavy ^{o+}	1,537		
Labour	P. H. Bowen	1,347		
Conservative	Terence Roche ^{o}	994	39.2	N/A
Conservative	E. Williams	811		
Conservative	Frances M. Arnold	800		
Turnout			37.3	N/A
Registered electors		6,788		
Labour win (new seat)				
Labour win (new seat)				
Labour win (new seat)				

=== Splott (3 seats) ===
Splott
Party	Candidate	Votes	%	±%
Labour	John Brooks ^{o+}	1,830	65.9	N/A
Labour	V. Minton	1,786		
Labour	R. Ormonde ^{o}	1,780		
Conservative	D. O'Connell	761	27.4	N/A
Conservative	K. C. Lewis	698		
Conservative	J. Stark	692		
Communist	S. Garrett-Jones	186	6.7	N/A
Turnout			32.5	N/A
Registered electors		8,553		
Labour win (new seat)				
Labour win (new seat)				
Labour win (new seat)				

=== Whitchurch (3 seats) ===
Whitchurch
Party	Candidate	Votes	%	±%
Conservative	David Purnell ^{A}	2,672	50.3	N/A
Labour	Philip Norton ^{o+}	2,641	49.7	N/A
Conservative	J. M. Davies	2,596		
Conservative	Victor Riley	2,533		
Labour	A. Doone	2,269		
Labour	D. Weeks	2,132		
Turnout			50.4	N/A
Registered electors		10,543		
Conservative win (new seat)				
Labour win (new seat)				
Conservative win (new seat)				

KEY

o = sitting councillor on (pre-1974) Cardiff City Council
A = sitting alderman on (pre 1974) Cardiff City Council
+ = elected as councillor to South Glamorgan County Council in April 1973
