= 1970 Cardiff City Council election =

Local election in Cardiff, Wales

The 1970 Cardiff City Council election was held on Thursday 7 May 1970 to elect councillors to Cardiff City Council in Cardiff, Glamorgan, Wales. It took place on the same day as many other local elections in Wales and England.

The previous elections to this one were in May 1969 and the next elections would be in May 1971. These would be some of the last all-Cardiff elections before the dissolution of the unitary authority and the creation of the new second-tier district authority of Cardiff City Council in 1974.

The election saw the Labour Party taking seats from the Conservatives.

== Background ==
Cardiff County Borough Council had been created in 1889. Cardiff became a city in 1905. Elections to the local authority were held annually, though not all council seats were included in each contest, because each of the three councillors in each ward stood down for election in rotation. The councillors elected in 1970 would be the last to serve a full three year term in office. Nineteen seats in 19 electoral wards were up for election in May 1970.

== Overview of the result ==
The Labour Party recovered the position they had been in prior to the 1967 election, gaining three seats from the Conservatives. This was credited to the fact Labour's supporters had come out to vote, rather than staying home as they had done at the last election. The campaign against the new hook road in the north of the city was a factor. Two wards where Labour made gains, Cathays and Central, were directly affected. Bill Herbert, who won in the Central ward, was chairman of the Cardiff United Residents Association and a leading campaigner against the new road.

The most prominent casualty of the election was Councillor Mary Hallinan, the Lady Mayoress, who lost her seat in the Central ward. The morning after the election, the Lord Mayor of Cardiff, Alderman Lincoln Hallinan, broke an 18 year tradition when he refused to welcome the three newly elected (Labour) councillors, Herbert, Matthewson and Edwards, in his parlour. He later agreed to meet them before the first council meeting the following week.

Despite winning their first seat on the council in 1969, and fielding a large number of candidates at the 1970 election, Plaid Cymru performed poorly, though managed to come second in Llandaff.

=== Council composition ===
Following the May 1970 election the balance on the city council was 57 Conservatives, 18 Labour and one Plaid Cymru.

== Ward results ==
Contests took place in every ward at this election.

=== Adamsdown ===
Adamsdown ward 1970
Party	Candidate	Votes	%	±%
Labour	John Patrick Keohane *	1,503		
Conservative	John Terence Curran	960		
Majority		543		
Labour hold		Swing		

=== Canton ===
Canton ward 1970
Party	Candidate	Votes	%	±%
Conservative	Trevor Tyrrell *	1,665		
Labour	Dengar Robinson Evans	1,283		
Plaid Cymru	Reginald James Stuart	332		
Majority		382		
Conservative hold		Swing		

=== Cathays ===
Cathays ward 1970
Party	Candidate	Votes	%	±%
Labour	John Charles Edwards	2,323		
Conservative	Bernard Arthur Bateman *	1,955		
Plaid Cymru	Terence Hiley O'Neill	507		
Majority		368		
Labour gain from Conservative		Swing		

=== Central ===
Central ward 1970
Party	Candidate	Votes	%	±%
Labour	William Penry Herbert	1,385		
Conservative	Mary Hallinan *	1,090		
Liberal	Richard Michael James	186		
Plaid Cymru	Dennis O'Neill	152		
Ratepayer	Denis George Parberry	35		
Majority		295		
Labour gain from Conservative		Swing		

=== Ely ===
Ely ward 1970
Party	Candidate	Votes	%	±%
Labour	William Carling *	2,989		
Conservative	Joan Joshua	1,239		
Plaid Cymru	Gerallt Wyn Davies	649		
Majority		1,750		
Labour hold		Swing		

=== Gabalfa ===
Gabalfa ward 1970
Party	Candidate	Votes	%	±%
Labour	William Emrys Pride *	2,752		
Conservative	Russell Gabe-Wilkinson	1,598		
Plaid Cymru	Brian Morgan Edwards	620		
Majority		1,154		
Labour hold		Swing		

=== Grangetown ===
Grangetown ward 1970
Party	Candidate	Votes	%	±%
Labour	Armour Bernard Matthewson	1,260		
Conservative	Anthea Jean Thomas	1,249		
Plaid Cymru	Peter Stayeley McMullen	315		
Majority		11		
Labour gain from Conservative		Swing		

Bernard Matthewson, a former city councillor, won after a recount.

=== Llanishen ===
Llanishen ward 1970
Party	Candidate	Votes	%	±%
Conservative	Lionel E. Pugh *	3,317		
Labour	John Gilbert May	1,763		
Plaid Cymru	Hugh Rosser Jordan	617		
Majority		1,554		
Conservative hold		Swing		

=== Llandaff ===
Llandaff ward 1970
Party	Candidate	Votes	%	±%
Conservative	Julius Hermer *	2,642		
Plaid Cymru	Gwen Humphreys	842		
Labour	Norma Lorraine Maylin	701		
Majority		1,800		
Conservative hold		Swing		

=== Penylan ===
Penylan ward 1970
Party	Candidate	Votes	%	±%
Conservative	Jean Lewis *	4,410		
Labour	Yvette Roblin	1,479		
Plaid Cymru	(Mrs) Ron Morgan Edwards	568		
Majority		3,231		
Conservative hold		Swing		

This was claimed to be the first ever all-woman ward election in Cardiff.

=== Plasmawr ===
Plasmawr ward 1970
Party	Candidate	Votes	%	±%
Labour	Hubert Harding *	2,538		
Conservative	Frederick John Jones	1,560		
Plaid Cymru	David John Davies	1,066		
Majority		978		
Labour hold		Swing		

=== Plasnewydd ===
Plasnewydd ward 1970
Party	Candidate	Votes	%	±%
Conservative	Olwen Watkin *	2,188		
Labour	Michael John Parry	1,190		
Plaid Cymru	Philip Broan Richards	398		
Liberal	Elizabeth Davina Forrest	276		
Majority		998		
Conservative hold		Swing		

=== Rhiwbina ===
Rhiwbina ward 1970
Party	Candidate	Votes	%	±%
Conservative	Martin Rodney Davies *	3,042		
Labour	William Michael Walker	938		
Plaid Cymru	William Gwynfor Hughes	858		
Majority		2.102		
Conservative hold		Swing		

=== Riverside ===
Riverside ward 1970
Party	Candidate	Votes	%	±%
Conservative	David C. Parnell *	1,525		
Labour	Thomas Clifford Lee	885		
Plaid Cymru	Robert Francis Thomas	324		
Majority		640		
Conservative hold		Swing		

=== Roath ===
Roath ward 1970
Party	Candidate	Votes	%	±%
Conservative	Ronald Richards *	3,242		
Labour	John Stuart Scrivens	851		
Majority		2,391		
Conservative hold		Swing		

=== Rumney ===
Rumney ward 1970
Party	Candidate	Votes	%	±%
Labour	John Noel Rees *	2,876		
Conservative	Sylvia Brown	1,777		
Plaid Cymru	Michael Coughlin	498		
Majority		1,099		
Labour hold		Swing		

=== South ===
South ward 1970
Party	Candidate	Votes	%	±%
Conservative	Terence Roche *	1,660		
Labour	Harold George Bartlett	1,504		
Communist	Frank Taylor	64		
Majority		156		
Conservative hold		Swing		

=== Splott ===
Splott ward 1970
Party	Candidate	Votes	%	±%
Labour	Manuel C. Delgado *	2,438		
Conservative	Francis Joseph McCarthy	1,619		
Communist	Richard Horatio Spencer	45		
Majority		819		
Labour hold		Swing		

=== Whitchurch ===
Whitchurch ward 1970
Party	Candidate	Votes	%	±%
Conservative	George Everson Brown *	2,490		
Labour	Henry Gordon Howell	1,168		
Plaid Cymru	David Gareth Williams	401		
Majority		1,322		
Conservative hold		Swing		

* = 'retiring' ward councillor for re-election
