= 2017 Cardiff Council election =

Local election in Cardiff, Wales

- 4 May 2017

All 75 seats to Cardiff Council 38 seats needed for a majority

	First party	Second party	Third party
Leader	Phil Bale	David Walker	Elizabeth Clark
Party	Labour	Conservative	Liberal Democrats
Leader's seat	Llanishen	Lisvane	Cathays (defeated)
Seats before	44	7	17
Seats won	40/75	20/74	11/75
Seat change	▼4	▲13	▼6
Popular vote	113,025	72,920	44,823
Percentage	39.5%	25.5%	15.7%
Swing	▲3.2%	▲7.6%	▼0.7%
	Fourth party	Fifth party
Leader	Neil McEvoy	Fenella Bowden
Party	Plaid Cymru	Heath & Birchgrove Independents
Leader's seat	Fairwater	Heath
Seats before	3	1
Seats won	3/60	1/3
Seat change	0	0
Popular vote	41,243	3,810 (Heath)
Percentage	14.8%	1.3%
Swing	▲2.0%	▼0.2%
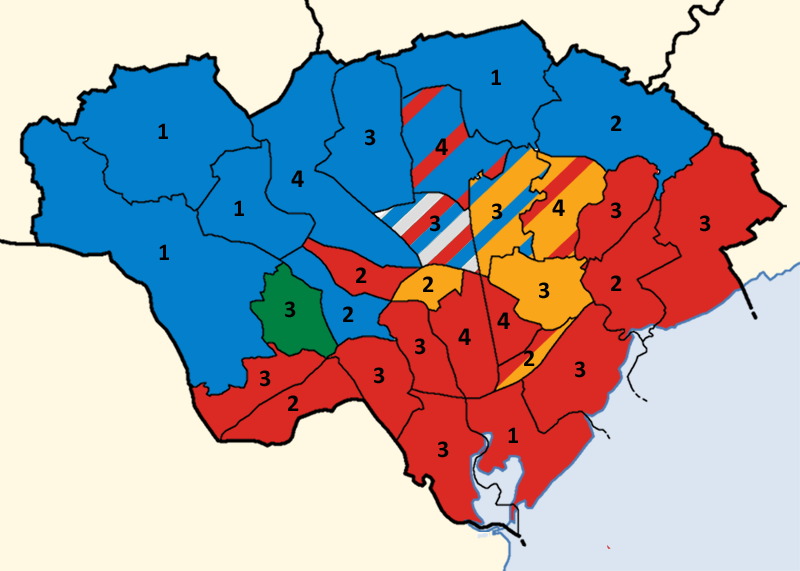
- Map showing the results of the 2017 City of Cardiff Council Elections.
Council control before election
Labour
Council control after election
Labour

The 2017 Cardiff Council election was held on 4 May 2017 as part of the national 2017 Welsh local elections. The elections were preceded by the 2012 elections and were followed by the 2022 elections.

== Election result ==
Labour maintained control of the authority following these elections, gaining their highest popular vote since 1995, but ending up with a reduced number of seats. The Conservatives achieved their best result since the unitary council was created in 1995, winning twenty seats and replacing the Liberal Democrats as the official opposition on the council. Plaid Cymru also secured their highest popular vote, despite standing in fewer seats than in 2012, but only won three seats. The Liberal Democrats in Cardiff suffered their worst election result in terms of total seats won (eleven) since 1995, whilst the local Green Party failed to win its first seat on the council, suffering a fall in support when compared to the 2012 election. The only independent candidate to be elected was Fenella Bowden in the Heath ward, who would become Cardiff Council's longest serving Independent councillor during the council term.

The only member of the original council elected in 1995 who had served continuously since then is Russell Goodway, former leader of the Council, who was again returned for the Ely ward. Others elected in 1995 but who had not remained members continuously included Graham Hinchey, Susan Lent, Sarah Merry, Lynda Thorne (Labour) and Fenella Bowden (LD/Independent).

Leader of the Plaid Cymru group, Neil McEvoy, was the only party leader to remain in post immediately after the election. Leader of the Liberal Democrats, Elizabeth Clark lost her Cathays seat to Labour. Conservative group leader, David Walker, also stood down immediately after the elections. Council leader and leader of the Labour group prior to the election, Phil Bale, was replaced by Splott councillor Huw Thomas.

City of Cardiff Council Composition 2017

Cardiff Council Election 2017
Party	Seats	Gains	Losses	Net gain/loss	Seats %	Votes %	Votes	+/−
Labour	40	4	8	-4	53.3	39.5	113,025	+3.2
Conservative	20	13	0	+13	26.6	25.5	72,920	+7.6
Liberal Democrats	11	0	5	-6	14.6	15.7	44,823	-0.7
Plaid Cymru	3	1	1	±0.0	4.0	14.8	42,352	+2.0
Heath/Birchgrove Ind.	1	0	0	±0.0	1.3	1.3	3,810	-0.2
Green	0	0	0	±0.0	0.0	1.3	3,822	-5.2
UKIP	0	0	0	±0.0	0.0	0.8	2,373	+0.3
Independent	0	0	3	-3	0.0	0.7	2,056	N/A
TUSC	0	0	0	±0.0	0.0	0.3	810	-0.2

== Manifestos ==
The four largest political groups on Cardiff Council produced manifestos for the 2017 local election campaign. The Heath Independents committed to six pledges ahead of the election.

The South Wales Echo also interviewed the four largest political group leaders prior to election day.

Cardiff Labour
Cardiff Conservatives
Cardiff Liberal Democrats
Plaid Cymru

== Ward results ==
* = sitting councillor in this ward prior to election

=== Adamsdown (2 seats) ===
Adamsdown
Party	Candidate	Votes	%	±%
Liberal Democrats	Nigel Howells*	917	42.8	+3.0
Labour	Owen Jones	913	42.6	+3.4
Labour	Gwenda Owen	874		
Liberal Democrats	John Dixon	863		
Conservative	Catherine Hemingway	107	5.0	+2.1
Plaid Cymru	Edward Mason	105	4.9	−0.4
Plaid Cymru	Esyllt Meurig	100		
Green	Mark Pritchard	99	4.6	−1.8
Conservative	Pauline Ambani	97		
TUSC	David Reid	27	1.3	−2.4
Turnout		2,144	36.1	+7.4
Registered electors		5,946		
Liberal Democrats hold		Swing		
Labour hold		Swing		

=== Butetown (1 seat) ===
Butetown
Party	Candidate	Votes	%	±%
Labour	Saeed Ebrahim	1,462	56.3	+19.0
Plaid Cymru	Arreyeh-Naasir Aadan	462	17.8	−0.7
Conservative	Heather Ward	356	13.7	+2.8
Liberal Democrats	Michail Arapis	237	9.1	−23.2
Green	Neil Monteiro	85	3.3	−0.3
Turnout		2,597	34.9	+4.6
Registered electors		7,438		
Labour hold		Swing		

=== Caerau (2 seats) ===
Caerau
Party	Candidate	Votes	%	±%
Labour	Peter Bradbury*	1,340	51.1	−7.2
Labour	Elaine Simmons*	1,152		
Plaid Cymru	Matthew Harvey	881	33.6	+23.5
Plaid Cymru	Jonathan Swan	788		
Conservative	Edna Huntley	382	14.6	+6.3
Conservative	Kolawole Ponnle	277		
Liberal Democrats	John Speake	71	2.7	−14.8
Liberal Democrats	Laura Speake	61		
TUSC	John Williams	28	1.1	N/A
Turnout		2,623	33.4	+4.1
Registered electors		7,859		
Labour hold		Swing		
Labour hold		Swing		

=== Canton (3 seats) ===
Canton
Party	Candidate	Votes	%	±%
Labour	Susan Elsmore*	2,370	42.3	−5.3
Labour	Stephen Cunnah	2,314		
Labour	Ramesh Patel*	2,301		
Plaid Cymru	Rhys ab Owen	2,105	37.5	+17.3
Plaid Cymru	Elin Tudur	1,944		
Plaid Cymru	John Lowes	1,867		
Conservative	David Davies	666	11.9	+1.1
Conservative	Barbara Davies	649		
Liberal Democrats	Morgan Griffith-David	376	6.7	+4.2
Conservative	Aileen Ashmore	363		
Green	Daniel McGowan	363	6.5	−9.1
Liberal Democrats	Peter Harding	281		
Liberal Democrats	Andrew Owen	274		
Turnout		5,607	51.3	+10.0
Registered electors		10,929		
Labour hold		Swing		
Labour hold		Swing		
Labour hold		Swing		

=== Cathays (4 seats) ===
Labour won all four seats. Ali Ahmed previously represented Butetown.

Cathays
Party	Candidate	Votes	%	±%
Labour	Sarah Merry*	1,639	50.3	+20.6
Labour	Ali Ahmed	1,581		
Labour	Chris Weaver*	1,468		
Labour	Norma Mackie	1,458		
Liberal Democrats	Elizabeth Clark*	976	30.0	+2.5
Liberal Democrats	Jack Satterthwaite	843		
Liberal Democrats	Thomas Pilliner	834		
Liberal Democrats	Paul Bailey	809		
Green	Helen Westhead	416	12.8	−8.7
Plaid Cymru	Daniel Bryant	318	9.8	+0.8
Conservative	Emily Higham	308	9.4	+1.7
Conservative	Simon Rees	300		
Conservative	Joseph Ventre	297		
Plaid Cymru	Peter Davies	280		
Plaid Cymru	Emily Cole	274		
Plaid Cymru	Emyr Gruffydd	250		
Conservative	Callum Sloper	244		
TUSC	Calum Glanville-Ellis	81	2.5	N/A
TUSC	Sebastian Robyns-Landricombe	63		
Turnout		3,256	28.1	+10.5
Registered electors		11,589		
Labour hold		Swing		
Labour hold		Swing		
Labour hold		Swing		
Labour gain from Liberal Democrats		Swing		

=== Creigiau & St. Fagans (1 seat) ===
Creigiau & St. Fagans
Party	Candidate	Votes	%	±%
Conservative	Graham Thomas*	948	47.0	+9.8
Plaid Cymru	Wynford Owen	644	31.9	−4.8
Labour	John Yarrow	334	16.6	−2.3
Liberal Democrats	Peter Borrow	91	4.5	+1.4
Turnout		2,018	50.3	+7.4
Registered electors		4,011		
Conservative hold		Swing		

=== Cyncoed (3 seats) ===
Cyncoed
Party	Candidate	Votes	%	±%
Liberal Democrats	Wendy Congreve	1,874	39.9	−4.8
Conservative	Kathryn Kelloway	1,852	39.4	+12.4
Liberal Democrats	Bablin Molik	1,769		
Conservative	Lee Canning	1,737		
Conservative	Lee Gonzalez	1,733		
Liberal Democrats	Jayne Lutwyche	1,727		
Labour	Ian Bounds	996	21.2	+4.3
Labour	Alvin Shum	757		
Labour	Louise Thomas	710		
Green	Timothy Jones	415	8.8	+3.4
Turnout		4,696	56.3	+13.0
Registered electors		8,344		
Liberal Democrats hold		Swing		
Conservative gain from Liberal Democrats		Swing		
Liberal Democrats hold		Swing		

=== Ely (3 seats) ===
Ely
Party	Candidate	Votes	%	±%
Labour	Irene Goddard*	1,472	51.4	−4.9
Labour	James Murphy*	1,380		
Labour	Russell Goodway*	1,269		
Plaid Cymru	Lowri Brown	786	27.4	
Plaid Cymru	Christopher Newth	745		
Plaid Cymru	Andrea Gibson	622		
Conservative	Owen Robbins	509	17.8	+9.4
Conservative	Leighton McEwan	507		
Liberal Democrats	Linda Amoss	267	9.3	+5.9
Liberal Democrats	Michael Rees	97		
Liberal Democrats	Matthew Hemsley	84		
TUSC	Richard Edwards	64	2.2	N/A
Turnout		2,864	29.5	+0.8
Registered electors		9,710		
Labour hold		Swing		
Labour hold		Swing		
Labour hold		Swing		

=== Fairwater (3 seats) ===
Fairwater
Party	Candidate	Votes	%	±%
Plaid Cymru	Neil McEvoy*	2,414	56.3	+13.5
Plaid Cymru	Lisa Ford*	2,349		
Plaid Cymru	Keith Parry	2,017		
Labour	Paul Mitchell*	1,160	27.1	−9.7
Labour	John Bayliss	1,101		
Labour	Irene Humphreys	1,039		
Conservative	John Williams	535	12.5	−1.5
Conservative	Alan Hill	533		
Conservative	Ronald Michaelis	450		
Liberal Democrats	Eleri Randerson	203	4.7	+2.9
Green	Phillip Croxall	190	4.4	−0.2
Liberal Democrats	Mark Rees	92		
Liberal Democrats	Oliver Townsend	92		
TUSC	Ross Saunders	73	1.7	N/A
Turnout		4,287	44.5	+3.7
Registered electors		9,639		
Plaid Cymru hold		Swing		
Plaid Cymru hold		Swing		
Plaid Cymru gain from Labour		Swing		

=== Gabalfa (2 seats) ===
Gabalfa
Party	Candidate	Votes	%	±%
Liberal Democrats	Rhys Taylor	922	44.1	−7.0
Liberal Democrats	Ashley Wood	920		
Labour	Joycelyn Coughlin	818	39.1	+11.8
Labour	Matthew Hexter	719		
Plaid Cymru	Sioned Treharne	178	8.5	+1.7
Plaid Cymru	Gareth Kennard-Holden	169		
Conservative	Niall Piercy	165	7.9	+1.6
Conservative	Margaret Evans	149		
Turnout		2,091	35.7	+10.1
Registered electors		5,863		
Liberal Democrats hold		Swing		
Liberal Democrats hold		Swing		

=== Grangetown (3 seats) ===
Plaid Cymru lost a seat they had gained in a by-election in November 2016.

Grangetown
Party	Candidate	Votes	%	±%
Labour	Ashley Lister	2,199	44.7	+4.5
Labour	Abdul Sattar	2,198		
Labour	Lynda Thorne*	2,121		
Plaid Cymru	Tariq Awan*	1,758	35.7	+2.2
Plaid Cymru	David Vaughan	1,438		
Plaid Cymru	Elizabeth Musa	1,310		
Conservative	Michael Bryan	671	13.6	+6.8
Conservative	Jenna Malvisi	604		
Conservative	Andrew Pike	580		
Liberal Democrats	Jahangir Hussain	350	7.1	−4.1
Green	Simon Morton	272	5.5	+0.7
Liberal Democrats	Malcolm Evans	232		
Liberal Democrats	Muhammad Latif	194		
TUSC	Lianne Francis	65	1.3	N/A
TUSC	Joseph Fathallah	46		
Turnout		4,924	37.3	+0.5
Registered electors		13,215		
Labour gain from Plaid Cymru		Swing		
Labour hold		Swing		
Labour hold		Swing		

=== Heath (3 seats) ===
The independent candidates stood again as Heath & Birchgrove Independents.

Heath
Party	Candidate	Votes	%	±%
Labour	Graham Hinchey*	2,010	38.2	+10.5
Conservative	Lyn Hudson*	1,830	34.8	+9.9
Heath Independent	Fenella Bowden*	1,737	33.0	+3.7
Labour	Penelope Owen	1,704		
Labour	Michael Ash-Edwards	1,667		
Conservative	Peter Hudson	1,602		
Conservative	Michelle Michaelis	1,477		
Heath Independent	Steven Bowden	1,143		
Heath Independent	Jane Reece	930		
Plaid Cymru	Helen Smith	410	7.8	+1.5
Green	Christopher Von Ruhland	251	4.8	−0.1
Liberal Democrats	Peter Randerson	244	4.6	−2.2
Liberal Democrats	Wijdan Said	163		
Liberal Democrats	Daniel Schmeising-Barnes	119		
Turnout		5,264	55.1	+11.0
Registered electors		9,490		
Labour hold		Swing		
Conservative hold		Swing		
Heath Independent hold		Swing		

=== Lisvane (1 seat) ===
Lisvane
Party	Candidate	Votes	%	±%
Conservative	David Walker*	1,232	75.6	+2.5
Labour	Jessica Taylor	219	13.4	−3.5
Liberal Democrats	Myfanwy Price	130	8.0	+3.5
Plaid Cymru	Anthony Couch	49	3.0	−0.6
Turnout		1,635	56.3	+8.6
Registered electors		2,903		
Conservative hold		Swing		

=== Llandaff (2 seats) ===
Llandaff
Party	Candidate	Votes	%	±%
Conservative	Sean Driscoll	1,370	35.7	+13.0
Conservative	Philipa Hill-John	1,169		
Plaid Cymru	Judith Allan	1,087	28.3	+18.9
Plaid Cymru	Angharad Llwyd	1,017		
Labour Co-op	Catherine Antippas	944	24.6	−3.1
Labour Co-op	Keith Jackson	853		
Independent	Mike Baker	349	9.1	+5.9
Liberal Democrats	Alexander Meredith	270	7.0	−24.5
Liberal Democrats	Christine Lutwyche	259		
Green	Benjamin Smith	130	3.4	−0.3
Turnout		3,836	55.6	+9.9
Registered electors		6,903		
Conservative gain from Liberal Democrats		Swing		
Conservative gain from Liberal Democrats		Swing		

=== Llandaff North (2 seats) ===
Llandaff North
Party	Candidate	Votes	%	±%
Labour	Dilwar Ali*	1,400	55.2	+7.8
Labour	Jennifer Burke-Davies	1,349		
Conservative	Elizabeth Morgan	531	20.9	+15.0
Plaid Cymru	Steffan Webb	439	17.3	+11.9
Conservative	Diana Abuzaid	422		
Plaid Cymru	Gillian Griffin	394		
Liberal Democrats	Elinor Dixon	171	6.7	−7.6
Liberal Democrats	Matthew Dixon	104		
Independent	Jonathan Bishop	56	2.2	−21.0
TUSC	Gwilym Evans	39	1.5	N/A
Turnout		2,537	43.9	+3.3
Registered electors		5,782		
Labour hold		Swing		
Labour hold		Swing		

=== Llanishen (4 seats) ===
Llanishen
Party	Candidate	Votes	%	±%
Conservative	Shaun Jenkins	2,890	43.8	+9.0
Labour Co-op	Phillip Bale*	2,805	42.5	+1.5
Conservative	John Lancaster	2,804		
Conservative	Thomas Parkhill	2,528		
Labour Co-op	Garry Hunt*	2,523		
Conservative	Daniel Ruff	2,383		
Labour Co-op	Jacqueline Jones	2,282		
Labour Co-op	Masudah Ali	2,254		
Plaid Cymru	Lona Roberts	666	10.1	+2.9
Liberal Democrats	Karl Mudd	593	9.0	+4.1
Liberal Democrats	Sarah Bridges	575		
Liberal Democrats	Anabella Rees	543		
Green	Michael Cope	528	8.0	+2.6
Liberal Democrats	Robert Godfrey	449		
UKIP	Lawrence Gwynn	323	4.9	−1.9
UKIP	Crispin John	240		
UKIP	Vivian Evans	220		
UKIP	John Hill	180		
Turnout		6,594	50.0	+12.9
Registered electors		13,175		
Conservative hold		Swing		
Labour Co-op hold		Swing		
Conservative gain from Labour Co-op		Swing		
Conservative gain from Labour Co-op		Swing		

=== Llanrumney (3 seats) ===
Llanrumney
Party	Candidate	Votes	%	±%
Labour	Keith Jones*	1,269	56.1	−11.9
Labour	Heather Joyce*	1,258		
Labour	Lee Bridgeman	1,195		
Conservative	Giles Cross	551	24.4	+10.0
Conservative	Maria Hill	484		
Conservative	Aled Jones-Pritchard	432		
UKIP	Gary Oldfield	255	11.3	N/A
UKIP	Teresa Davies	207		
Plaid Cymru	Trevor Keane	200	8.8	
UKIP	Robert Lewis	151		
Liberal Democrats	Wayne Street	126	5.6	+2.8
Plaid Cymru	Colin Lewis	114		
Plaid Cymru	Ceri Ann Tegwyn	96		
Liberal Democrats	Jonathan Bird	77		
Liberal Democrats	Patricia Rees	73		
Turnout		2,260	29.2	−0.4
Registered electors		7,744		
Labour hold		Swing		
Labour hold		Swing		
Labour hold		Swing		

=== Pentwyn (4 seats) ===
Pentwyn
Party	Candidate	Votes	%	±%
Liberal Democrats	Joseph Carter*	1,822	45.6	+1.8
Liberal Democrats	Emma-Janey Sandry	1,627		
Liberal Democrats	Daniel Naughton	1,548		
Labour	Frank Jacobsen	1,411	35.3	−2.4
Labour	Michael Fogg	1,409		
Liberal Democrats	Jonathan Shimmin	1,346		
Labour	Samsunear Ali	1,325		
Labour	Margaret Thomas	1,119		
Conservative	Kathleen Fisher	663	16.6	+9.7
Conservative	Munawar Mughal	623		
Conservative	Nathan Watson	559		
Conservative	Jack Sellers	530		
Plaid Cymru	Andrew Morgan	236	5.9	+1.3
Plaid Cymru	Pauline Morgan	228		
Plaid Cymru	Martin Pollard	202		
Plaid Cymru	Huw Hughes	172		
TUSC	Steve Williams	98	2.5	N/A
Turnout		3,994	37.6	+6.6
Registered electors		10,623		
Liberal Democrats hold		Swing		
Liberal Democrats hold		Swing		
Liberal Democrats hold		Swing		
Labour gain from Liberal Democrats		Swing		

=== Pentyrch (1 seat) ===
Pentyrch
Party	Candidate	Votes	%	±%
Conservative	Gavin Hill-John*	733	47.4	−7.0
Plaid Cymru	Hywel Wigley	518	33.5	+21.4
Labour	Richard Hughes	234	15.1	−14.0
Liberal Democrats	Caroline Morris	63	4.1	+2.5
Turnout		1,548	55.4	+3.1
Registered electors		2,790		
Conservative hold		Swing		

=== Penylan (3 seats) ===
Penylan
Party	Candidate	Votes	%	±%
Liberal Democrats	Joe Boyle*	2,519	25.6	−22.5
Liberal Democrats	Rodney Berman	2,195		
Liberal Democrats	Asghar Ali	2,078		
Labour	Louise Westlake	1,317	13.4	−12.6
Labour	Bethan Proctor	1,231		
Labour	Sajad Nazari	1,044		
Conservative	Sara Canning	855	8.7	−1.2
Conservative	Rhys Gadsby	743		
Conservative	Sophie Tyrill	723		
Plaid Cymru	Nick Carter	543	5.5	−2.2
Green	Huw Burrows	495	5.0	−3,3
Independent	Leigh Worrall	316	3.2	N/A
Turnout		9,897	50.1	+8.6
Registered electors		9,897		
Liberal Democrats hold		Swing		
Liberal Democrats hold		Swing		
Liberal Democrats hold		Swing		

=== Plasnewydd (4 seats) ===
The Liberal Democrats lost a seat they had gained in a by-election.

Plasnewydd
Party	Candidate	Votes	%	±%
Labour	Susan Lent*	2,408	52.2	+15.4
Labour	Daniel De'ath*	2,311		
Labour	Mary McGarry*	2,159		
Labour	Peter Wong	2,055		
Liberal Democrats	Manzoor Ahmed	1,545	33.5	+0.8
Liberal Democrats	Robin Rea*	1,531		
Liberal Democrats	Cadan Ap Tomos	1,410		
Liberal Democrats	Richard Jerrett	1,300		
Green	Daniel Ward	560	12.1	−0.7
Plaid Cymru	Mariana Montiel	371	8.0	−4.1
Plaid Cymru	Angharad Lewis	346		
Plaid Cymru	Matthew Lloyd	331		
Conservative	Enid Harries	297	6.4	+0.8
Conservative	Lucy Golding	289		
Conservative	Rowland Hemingway	252		
Conservative	Marc Gonzalez	223		
Turnout		4,611	38.9	+13.3
Registered electors		11,851		
Labour hold		Swing		
Labour hold		Swing		
Labour hold		Swing		
Labour gain from Liberal Democrats		Swing		

=== Pontprennau and Old St Mellons (2 seats) ===
Pontprennau & Old St Mellons
Party	Candidate	Votes	%	±%
Conservative	Dianne Rees*	1,851	57.6	+21.7
Conservative	Joel Williams	1,760		
Labour	Georgina Phillips*	1,134	35.3	−13.7
Labour	Shane Andrews	891		
Plaid Cymru	David Davies	200	6.2	−1.4
Liberal Democrats	Mary Naughton	176	5.5	+0.3
Liberal Democrats	David Keigwin	167		
Turnout		3,216	44.5	+10.4
Registered electors		7,221		
Conservative hold		Swing		
Conservative gain from Labour		Swing		

=== Radyr (1 seat) ===
Radyr
Party	Candidate	Votes	%	±%
Conservative	Roderick McKerlich*	1,193	43.1	−10.2
Plaid Cymru	Michael Deem	999	36.1	+28.9
Labour	Mohammed Islam	358	12.9	−19.5
Liberal Democrats	Hilary Borrow	218	7.9	+3.7
Turnout		2,772	53.4	+7.6
Registered electors		5,195		
Conservative hold		Swing		

=== Rhiwbina (3 seats) ===
Two of the three Independent councillors elected in 2012 rejoined the Conservatives in 2015 and the third Independent was defeated by a Conservative in this election.

Rhiwbina
Party	Candidate	Votes	%	±%
Conservative	Jayne Cowan*	3,595	63.0	+51.4
Conservative	Adrian Robson*	3,230		
Conservative	Oliver Owen	2,565		
Independent	Eleanor Sanders*	1,565	27.4	−41.5
Labour	Meurig Williams	1,524	26.7	+15.3
Labour	Clare Jones	1,500		
Labour	Alan Golding	1,159		
Plaid Cymru	Stephen Lake	402	7.0	+2.9
Liberal Democrats	Jonathan Land	371	6.5	+5.1
Liberal Democrats	Philippa Willmot	198		
Liberal Democrats	Dale Hargrove	170		
Turnout		5,710	61.9	+7.8
Registered electors		9,219		
Conservative gain from Independent		Swing		
Conservative gain from Independent		Swing		
Conservative gain from Independent		Swing		

=== Riverside (3 seats) ===
Riverside
Party	Candidate	Votes	%	±%
Labour	Iona Gordon*	2,278	53.2	+6.5
Labour	Caro Wild*	2,050		
Labour	Kanaya Singh	1,941		
Plaid Cymru	Ruksana Begum	1,126	26.3	−4.8
Plaid Cymru	Richard Williams	1,054		
Plaid Cymru	Mubashar Sawati	959		
Conservative	Jason Griffin	510	11.9	+4.2
Conservative	Leon Bancroft	464		
Conservative	Gaener Davies	415		
Liberal Democrats	Alun Williams	401	9.3	+5.5
Green	Kenneth Barker	400	9.3	+1.4
Liberal Democrats	Molik Ahmed	255		
Liberal Democrats	Callum Littlemore	218		
Independent	Ahmed Alsisi	86	2.0	N/A
Turnout		4,283	44.6	+9.4
Registered electors		9,595		
Labour hold		Swing		
Labour hold		Swing		
Labour hold		Swing		

=== Rumney (2 seats) ===
Rumney
Party	Candidate	Votes	%	±%
Labour	Robert Derbyshire*	1,030	46.3	−2.1
Labour	Jacqueline Parry*	1,017		
Conservative	Gareth Lloyd	871	39.2	+11.5
Conservative	James Roach	684		
UKIP	John Ireland	221	9.9	N/A
UKIP	Wayne Cashin	204		
Liberal Democrats	Peter Amoss	104	4.7	+2.6
Liberal Democrats	Hugh Minor	91		
TUSC	Emily Stables	39	1.8	−0.1
Turnout		2,222	33.5	+3.6
Registered electors		6,629		
Labour hold		Swing		
Labour hold		Swing		

=== Splott (3 seats) ===
Splott
Party	Candidate	Votes	%	±%
Labour	Elizabeth Henshaw	1,685	55.3	+7.4
Labour	Huw Thomas*	1,658		
Labour	Edward Stubbs*	1,656		
Conservative	Robert Lawrence	416	13.6	+9.3
Liberal Democrats	Zara England	413	13.5	−16.5
Conservative	Gail Morgan	401		
Plaid Cymru	Stephanie Greedy	398	13.1	+6.0
Plaid Cymru	Rhys Cisuelo	385		
Conservative	Vivienne Ward	373		
Liberal Democrats	Philip Dore	356		
Liberal Democrats	James Bear	322		
Plaid Cymru	Favour Egbekayi	292		
Green	Samuel Patterson	170	5.6	−1.1
TUSC	Katrine Williams	70	2.3	−0.7
TUSC	David Bartlett	67		
TUSC	Jioao Felix	50		
Turnout		3,047	33.1	+3.0
Registered electors		9,211		
Labour hold		Swing		
Labour hold		Swing		
Labour hold		Swing		

=== Trowbridge (3 seats) ===
Ralph Cook was elected as a Labour candidate in 2012.

Trowbridge
Party	Candidate	Votes	%	±%
Labour	Christopher Lay	1,239	42.0	−16.5
Labour	Mary Bowen-Thomson	1,145		
Labour	Michael Costas-Michael*	1,061		
Liberal Democrats	Ralph Cook*	741	25.1	+11.1
Conservative	Richard Foley	692	23.4	+10.0
UKIP	Thomas Harrison	620	21.0	N/A
Conservative	Janine Jones-Pritchard	584		
Liberal Democrats	Jade Smith	540		
Liberal Democrats	Russell Tysoe	479		
Conservative	Thomas Hall	249		
Plaid Cymru	Cerith Griffiths	235	8.0	−2.5
Plaid Cymru	Catrin Davies	211		
Plaid Cymru	Patrick Daley	196		
UKIP	Richard Lewis	193		
UKIP	Lawrence Lado	172		
Turnout		2,951	26.6	+4.6
Registered electors		11,089		
Labour hold		Swing		
Labour hold		Swing		
Labour hold		Swing		

=== Whitchurch and Tongwynlais (4 seats) ===
Whitchurch & Tongwynlais
Party	Candidate	Votes	%	±%
Conservative	Michael Phillips	2,905	41.5	+0.3
Conservative	Timothy Davies	2,900		
Conservative	Linda Morgan	2,856		
Conservative	Michael Jones-Pritchard	2,753		
Labour	Hannah Buckingham	2,700	38.6	−2.6
Labour	Marc Palmer	2,488		
Labour	Norman Gettings	2,461		
Labour	Maliika Kaaba	2,234		
Plaid Cymru	Mali Rowlands	962	13.8	+3.4
Plaid Cymru	Daniel Allsobrook	951		
Plaid Cymru	Glenys Evans	885		
Plaid Cymru	Julia Burns	856		
Liberal Democrats	Lynne Barrett-Lee	540	7.7	+3.4
Liberal Democrats	Dominic Eggbeer	516		
Liberal Democrats	Geraldine Nichols	365		
Liberal Democrats	Usman Bukhari	312		
Turnout		6,994	55.6	+13.1
Registered electors		12,589		
Conservative gain from Labour		Swing		
Conservative gain from Labour		Swing		
Conservative gain from Labour		Swing		
Conservative gain from Labour		Swing		

== By-elections between 2017 and 2022 ==
=== Ely ===
Ely by-election, 21 February 2019
Party	Candidate	Votes	%	±%
Plaid Cymru	Andrea Gibson	831	43.1	+17.8
Labour	Irene Humphreys	779	40.4	−7.1
Conservative	Gavin Brookman	271	14.1	−2.4
Liberal Democrats	Richard Jerrett	46	2.4	−6.2
Majority		52	2.7	N/A
Turnout		1,927	20.3	−9.2
Registered electors		9,482		
Plaid Cymru gain from Labour		Swing		

The by-election was caused by the death of Labour councillor Jim Murphy on 1 December 2018.

=== Cyncoed ===
Cyncoed by-election 16 July 2019
Party	Candidate	Votes	%	±%
Liberal Democrats	Robert Hopkins	1,920	55.3	+18.9
Conservative	Peter Hudson	838	24.1	−11.9
Labour	Madhu Khanna-Davies	560	16.1	−3.3
Plaid Cymru	Morgan Rogers	152	4.4	N/A
Majority		1,082	31.1	+13.4
Turnout		3,484	42.1	−1.2
Registered electors		8,268		
Liberal Democrats hold		Swing	+15.4	

The by-election was caused by the death of Liberal Democrat Councillor Wendy Congreve on 14 May 2019.

=== Whitchurch & Tongwynlais ===
Whitchurch & Tongwynlais by-election 3 October 2019
Party	Candidate	Votes	%	±%
Conservative	Mia Rees	1,544	36.4	−4.5
Labour	Marc Palmer	1,190	28.0	−10.0
Plaid Cymru	Dan Allsobrook	674	15.9	+2.3
Liberal Democrats	Sian Donne	588	13.9	+6.3
Green	David Griffin	248	5.8	−2.3
Majority		354	8.4	+3.2
Turnout		4,244	33.7	−11.7
Registered electors		12,589		
Conservative hold		Swing	+2.7	

The by-election was caused by the death of Conservative councillor Tim Davies on 4 June 2019.

=== Llanishen ===
Llanishen by-election 21 November 2019
Party	Candidate	Votes	%	±%
Conservative	Siân-Elin Melbourne	1,566	43.4	+6.3
Labour	Garry Hunt	1,254	34.7	−1.2
Liberal Democrats	Will Ogborne	387	10.7	+3.1
Plaid Cymru	Chris Haines	209	5.8	−2.7
Green	Michael Cope	138	3.8	−3.0
Independent	Lawrence Gwynn	59	1.6	N/A
Majority		312	8.7	N/A
Turnout		3,613	27.3	−18.9
Registered electors		13,227		
Conservative gain from Labour		Swing		

The by-election was caused by the resignation of Labour councillor Phil Bale in Autumn 2019.

=== Heath ===
Heath by-election 11 November 2021
Party	Candidate	Votes	%	±%
Labour	Julie Sangani	1,729	47.1	+16.1
Conservative	Peter Hudson	1,128	30.8	+2.5
Liberal Democrats	Kathryn Lock	561	15.3	+11.5
Plaid Cymru	Gwennol Haf	250	6.8	+0.5
Majority		601	16.3	N/A
Turnout		3,668	38.4	−16.6
Registered electors		9,552		
Labour gain from Independent		Swing		

The by-election was caused by the resignation of Councillor Fenella Bowden, who stepped down for health reasons in September 2021.

== Other changes between 2017 and 2021 ==
Neil McEvoy was expelled by Plaid Cymru for 18 months on 19 March 2018, and then sat under the label "Fairwater Cardiff West". In February 2020 he formed the Welsh National Party, later to become "Propel" along with 3 other former Plaid Cymru councillors. One of those, Ely councillor Andrea Gibson, later left the party and sat as an independent.

An Electoral Review undertaken by the Local Democracy and Boundary Commission for Wales recommended an increase to the total number of council seats in Cardiff from 75 to 79 ahead of the next election. The changes were accepted with only slight modification, to take effect from the 2022 council election.
