= 2012 Cardiff Council election =

Local election in Cardiff, Wales

2012 Cardiff City and County Council election
- 3 May 2012

All 75 seats to Cardiff Council 38 seats needed for a majority

	First party	Second party	Third party
Leader	Heather Joyce	Rodney Berman	David Walker
Party	Labour	Liberal Democrats	Conservative
Leader's seat	Llanrumney	Plasnewydd	Lisvane
Seats before	14	35	17
Seats won	46/75	16/75	7/74
Seat change	▲32	▼19	▼10
Popular vote	36,148	15,878	17,886
Percentage	37.3%	18.5%	25.5%
	Fourth party	Fifth party	Sixth party
Leader	Neil McEvoy	Adrian Robson	Fenella Bowden
Party	Plaid Cymru	Rhiwbina Independents	Heath Independent
Leader's seat	Fairwater	Rhiwbina	Heath
Seats before	7	3	0
Seats won	2/70	3/3	1/3
Seat change	▼5	0	▲1
Popular vote	12,397	4,581 (Rhiwbina)	1,500 (Heath)
Percentage	12.8%	4.7%	1.5%
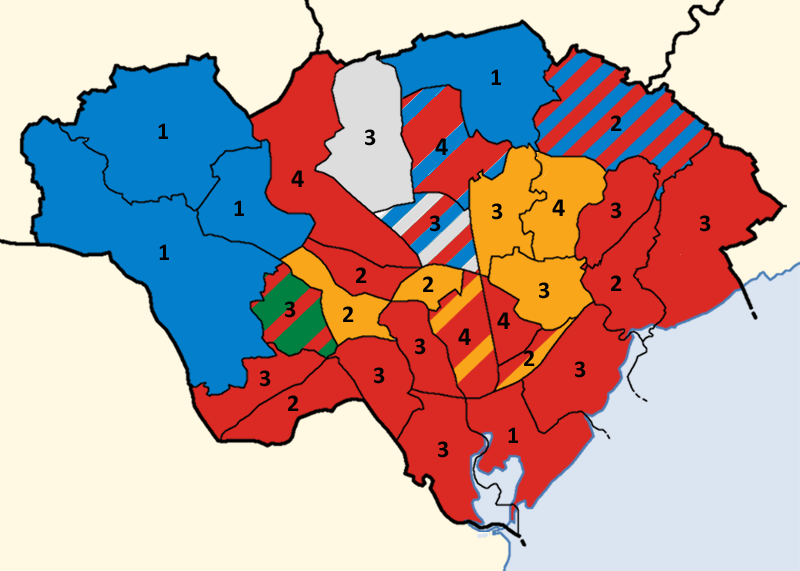
- Map showing the results of the 2012 City of Cardiff Council Elections.
Council control before election
Lib Dem / Plaid Cymru Coalition
Council control after election
Labour

The 2012 Cardiff Council election took place on Thursday 3 May 2012 to elect members of Cardiff Council in Wales. This was the same day as the national 2012 Welsh local elections. It was preceded by the 2008 election and followed by the 2017 election

== Election result ==
Labour gained control of the council from the Liberal Democrats and Plaid Cymru, after gaining 32 seats. The Liberal Democrat leader of the council, Rodney Berman, lost his seat by 51 votes after two recounts, bringing Labour's gains to 33. Sixty-one-year-old Labour councillor Heather Joyce, nicknamed 'Supernan' by the local newspaper, became the new council leader.

Cardiff Council Election 2012
Party	Seats	Gains	Losses	Net gain/loss	Seats %	Votes %	Votes	+/−
Labour	46	32	0	+32	61.3	37.3	36,148	+10.5
Liberal Democrats	16	0	19	-19	21.3	16.4	15,878	-8.3
Conservative	7	1	11	-10	9.3	18.5	17,886	-8.0
Independent	4	1	0	0	4.0	4.7	4,581	-0.3
Plaid Cymru	2	0	4	-4	2.7	12.8	12,397	-0.6
Green	0	0	0	±0.0	0.0	6.5	6,307	+4.3
Heath/Birchgrove Ind.	1	1	0	+1	1.3	1.5	1,500	N/A
Llandaff North Ind.	0	0	0	±0.0	0.0	0.6	607	N/A
TUSC	0	0	0	±0.0	0.0	0.5	456	N/A
UKIP	0	0	0	±0.0	0.0	0.5	445	+0.1
Communist	0	0	0	±0.0	0.0	0.3	335	+0.2
Christian Party (Wales)	0	0	0	±0.0	0.0	0.2	205	N/A
Socialist Labour	0	0	0	±0.0	0.0	0.1	106	N/A

^{A} The consolidated vote figures used in the above table appear to represent the total votes cast for the highest placed candidates in each ward. The figures are not the popular vote cast for each party in the 2012 elections.
^{B} The figures below are the total votes cast for all candidates for each party in the 2012 elections, based on data from The Elections Centre at Plymouth University - Lab: 99,391 (46/75); Con: 45,293 (7/74); LD: 43,418 (16/75); PC: 30,989 (2/70); Rhiwbina Ind: 10,908 (3/3); Green: 8,925 (0/37); Heath Ind: 3,539 (1/3); LN Ind: 1,114 (0/2); Ind: 773 (0/4); TUSC: 456 (0/6); UKIP: 445 (0/2); Communist: 335 (0/4); Christian: 205 (0/3); Socialist Lab: 106 (0/1)

== Manifestos ==
Cardiff Greens

Cardiff Labour

Cardiff Liberal Democrats

Cardiff Plaid Cymru

== Ward results ==
* = sitting councillor in this ward prior to election

=== Adamsdown (2 seats) ===
Adamsdown
Party	Candidate	Votes	%	±%
Liberal Democrats	Nigel Howells*	731	39.8	−13.5
Labour	Manzoor Ahmed	719	39.2	+14.4
Liberal Democrats	John Dixon*	683		
Labour	Sian Thomas	681		
Green	Matthew Townsend	117	6.4	N/A
Plaid Cymru	Phillip Evans	97	5.3	+1.5
TUSC	Dave Bartlett	68	3.7	N/A
Plaid Cymru	Dean Minto	67		
Conservative	Joel Jackson	53	2.9	−6.3
Communist	Fran Rawlings	50	2.7	N/A
Conservative	Robert Price	37		
Turnout		1,771	28.7	+1.5
Registered electors		6,182		
Liberal Democrats hold		Swing		
Labour gain from Liberal Democrats		Swing		

=== Butetown (1 seat) ===
Butetown
Party	Candidate	Votes	%	±%
Labour	Ali Ahmed	777	37.3	+3.1
Liberal Democrats	Delme Greening*	673	32.3	−8.5
Plaid Cymru	Liz Musa	386	18.5	N/A
Conservative	Laura Pike	126	6.0	−10.9
Green	Sam Roads	72	3.5	N/A
UKIP	Simon Zeigler	49	2.4	N/A
Turnout		2,096	30.3	+1.4
Registered electors		6,918		
Labour gain from Liberal Democrats		Swing		

=== Caerau (2 seats) ===
Caerau
Party	Candidate	Votes	%	±%
Labour	Peter Bradbury	1,390	58.4	+27.5
Labour	Elaine Simmons	1,290		
Liberal Democrats	Jacqui Gasson*	417	17.5	−31.0
Liberal Democrats	Roger Burley*	318		
Plaid Cymru	Stuart Cosslet	240	10.1	+1.3
Conservative	Clive Williams	198	8.3	−3.5
Conservative	Alec Burns	186		
Plaid Cymru	Ruksana Begum	160		
Green	Anne Greagsby	134	5.6	N/A
Turnout		4,333	29.3	−2.3
Registered electors		7,722		
Labour gain from Liberal Democrats		Swing		
Labour gain from Liberal Democrats		Swing		

=== Canton (3 seats) ===
Canton
Party	Candidate	Votes	%	±%
Labour	Ramesh Patel*	2,230	47.6	+11.0
Labour	Cerys Furlong*	2,130		
Labour	Richard Cook*	2,128		
Plaid Cymru	Sian Powell	910	19.4	−5.9
Plaid Cymru	Lieu Williams	837		
Plaid Cymru	Ben Foday	824		
Green	David Griffiths	730	15.6	+5.2
Green	Nigel Pugh	564		
Conservative	Robert Cadman	505	10.8	−6.5
Green	Stephanie Griggs	503		
Conservative	Pamela Richards	468		
Conservative	Hussain Bayoomi	426		
Liberal Democrats	Matthew Dixon	118	2.5	−4.8
Socialist Labour	Simon Parsons	106	2.3	N/A
Liberal Democrats	Matthew O'Grady	98		
TUSC	Ross Saunders	90	1.9	N/A
Liberal Democrats	Stephen Hyde	84		
Turnout		4,461	41.3	−2.9
Registered electors		10,814		
Labour hold		Swing		
Labour hold		Swing		
Labour hold		Swing		

=== Cathays (4 seats) ===
Cathays
Party	Candidate	Votes	%	±%
Labour	Sarah Merry	877	29.7	+12.4
Labour	Sam Knight	873		
Liberal Democrats	Elizabeth Clark*	810	27.5	−14.9
Labour	Chris Weaver	807		
Liberal Democrats	Matthew Smith	794		
Labour	Peter Wong	786		
Liberal Democrats	Jonathan Aylwin*	775		
Liberal Democrats	Asghar Ali	702		
Green	Jack Parker	633	21.5	+8.7
Green	Sam Coates	593		
Green	Sian Howson	526		
Green	Sebastian Power	469		
Plaid Cymru	Emyr Gruffydd	266	9.0	−6.1
Plaid Cymru	Cerith Jones	244		
Plaid Cymru	Glenn Page	235		
Conservative	Jennifer Ankers	228	7.7	−4.8
Conservative	Oliver Wannell	214		
Conservative	Ryan Hunter	207		
Plaid Cymru	Andrew Pearce	204		
Conservative	George Carrol	189		
Independent	Adrian Norris	135	4.6	N/A
Turnout		2,788	17.6	+1.2
Registered electors		15,853		
Labour gain from Liberal Democrats		Swing		
Labour gain from Liberal Democrats		Swing		
Liberal Democrats hold		Swing		
Labour gain from Liberal Democrats		Swing		

=== Creigiau & St. Fagans (1 seat) ===
Creigiau & St. Fagans
Party	Candidate	Votes	%	±%
Conservative	Graham Thomas	648	38.2	+15.1
Plaid Cymru	Wynford Owen	623	36.7	−25.4
Labour	Sarah-Anne Evans	321	18.9	+9.1
Liberal Democrats	Hilary Borrow	53	3.1	−1.8
Green	Timothy Jones	52	3.1	N/A
Turnout		1,702	42.9	−6.3
Registered electors		3,966		
Conservative gain from Plaid Cymru		Swing		

=== Cyncoed (3 seats) ===
Cyncoed
Party	Candidate	Votes	%	±%
Liberal Democrats	Kate Lloyd*	1,809	44.7	−6.0
Liberal Democrats	Margaret Jones*	1,727		
Liberal Democrats	David Rees*	1,698		
Conservative	Ross England	1,093	27.0	−4.8
Conservative	Michael Flynn	1,006		
Conservative	Lee Gonzalez	966		
Labour	Samsunear Ali	683	16.9	+5.5
Labour	Robert Sherrington	661		
Labour	Shukri Masseri	614		
Plaid Cymru	Alun Ogwen	241	6.0	−0.1
Green	Geraldine Allen-Manson	217	5.4	N/A
Plaid Cymru	Gwenno Williams	177		
Plaid Cymru	Jonathan Edwards	168		
Turnout		8,782	43.3	−6.4
Registered electors		8,782		
Liberal Democrats hold		Swing		
Liberal Democrats hold		Swing		
Liberal Democrats hold		Swing		

=== Ely (3 seats) ===
Ely
Party	Candidate	Votes	%	±%
Labour	Irene Goddard*	1,597	56.3	+9.7
Labour	James Murphy	1,481		
Labour	Russell Goodway*	1,468		
Plaid Cymru	Lynda Sullivan	791	27.9	+2.8
Plaid Cymru	Neil Branson	776		
Plaid Cymru	Peter Sullivan	767		
Conservative	Rhodri Jones-Pritchard	237	8.4	−10.8
Conservative	Joshua Noon	236		
Conservative	Vivienne Ward	230		
Green	Delyth Horle	115	4.1	N/A
Liberal Democrats	Sian Cliff	95	3.4	−5.7
Liberal Democrats	Thomas Donne	83		
Liberal Democrats	John Richards	75		
Turnout		2,795	29.2	+0.5
Registered electors		9,579		
Labour hold		Swing		
Labour hold		Swing		
Labour hold		Swing		

=== Fairwater (3 seats) ===
Fairwater
Party	Candidate	Votes	%	±%
Plaid Cymru	Neil McEvoy*	1,643	42.8	−5.8
Plaid Cymru	Lisa Ford	1,562		
Labour	Paul Mitchell	1,412	36.8	+12.2
Labour	Joseph Monks	1,384		
Plaid Cymru	Keith Parry*	1,341		
Labour	Ryan Williams	1,315		
Conservative	Sean Driscoll	539	14.0	−7.7
Conservative	James Roach	419		
Conservative	David Morrison	387		
Green	Brian Pearce	176	4.6	N/A
Liberal Democrats	Peter Randerson	68	1.8	−3.3
Liberal Democrats	Jean Scullion	64		
Liberal Democrats	Molik Ahmed	62		
Turnout		3,653	37.9	+2.9
Registered electors		9,632		
Plaid Cymru hold		Swing		
Plaid Cymru hold		Swing		
Labour gain from Plaid Cymru		Swing		

=== Gabalfa (2 seats) ===
Gabalfa
Party	Candidate	Votes	%	±%
Liberal Democrats	Ed Bridges*	936	51.1	−1.7
Liberal Democrats	Gareth Holden	891		
Labour	Clare Jones	500	27.3	+7.7
Labour	Gerald Crocker	497		
Plaid Cymru	Brian Coman	125	6.8	−2.5
Conservative	Jonathan Breeze	115	6.3	−5.2
Green	Edward Mason	106	5.8	−1.0
Conservative	Purdey Miles	91		
Plaid Cymru	Stuart Evans	86		
TUSC	David Hamblin	51	2.8	N/A
Turnout		1,756	25.6	−0.1
Registered electors		6,859		
Liberal Democrats hold		Swing		
Liberal Democrats hold		Swing		

=== Grangetown (3 seats) ===
Grangetown
Party	Candidate	Votes	%	±%
Labour	Ashley Govier	1,812	40.2	+13.5
Labour	Chris Lomax	1,709		
Labour	Lynda Thorne	1,704		
Plaid Cymru	Abdul Sattar	1,511	33.5	+7.7
Plaid Cymru	Mohammed Awan	1,467		
Plaid Cymru	Luke Nicholas	1,391		
Liberal Democrats	Francesca Montemaggi*	505	11.2	−20.7
Liberal Democrats	David Morgan*	501		
Liberal Democrats	Paul Harding	489		
Conservative	Vincent Bailey	308	6.8	−6.0
Conservative	Axel Kaehne	266		
Conservative	Karys Oram	251		
Green	Sian Best	215	4.8	N/A
Green	Ken Barker	205		
Christian	Clive Bate	84	1.9	N/A
Communist	Rick Newnham	77	1.7	−1.0
Turnout		4,427	34.1	−2.7
Registered electors		13,002		
Labour gain from Liberal Democrats		Swing		
Labour gain from Liberal Democrats		Swing		
Labour gain from Liberal Democrats		Swing		

=== Heath (3 seats) ===
Fenella Bowden, elected as a Liberal Democrat in 2008, stood as a Heath & Birchgrove Independent.

Heath
Party	Candidate	Votes	%	±%
Heath Independent	Fenella Bowden*	1,500	29.3	N/A
Labour	Graham Hinchey*	1,416	27.7	+12.5
Conservative	Lyn Hudson	1,277	24.9	−12.6
Conservative	Ron Page*	1,242		
Labour	Marie John	1,240		
Heath Independent	Steve Bowden	1,151		
Labour	Ewan Moor	1,116		
Conservative	Mark Branton	1,101		
Heath Independent	Katrin O'Malley	888		
Liberal Democrats	Jim James	349	6.8	−25.1
Plaid Cymru	Mali Rowlands	325	6.3	−1.7
Heath Independent	Robert Smith	262		
Green	Tom Coates	253	4.9	−2.5
Liberal Democrats	Steven Price	175		
Liberal Democrats	Ashley Wood	140		
Turnout		4,318	44.1	−7.7
Registered electors		9,799		
Independent gain from Liberal Democrats		Swing		
Labour hold		Swing		
Conservative hold		Swing		

=== Lisvane (1 seat) ===
Lisvane
Party	Candidate	Votes	%	±%
Conservative	David Walker*	999	73.1	−6.8
Labour	Joshua Lovell	231	16.9	+4.9
Liberal Democrats	Myfanwy Price	61	4.5	−3.6
Plaid Cymru	Anthony Couch	49	3.6	N/A
Green	Rosa Thomas	27	2.0	N/A
Turnout		1,368	47.7	−8.3
Registered electors		2,868		
Conservative hold		Swing		

=== Llandaff (2 seats) ===
Llandaff
Party	Candidate	Votes	%	±%
Liberal Democrats	Kirsty Davies*	1,121	31.5	−1.5
Liberal Democrats	Gareth Aubrey*	1,081		
Labour	Catherine Antippas	989	27.7	+1.3
Labour	Simon Jones	932		
Conservative	Jason Griffin	809	22.7	−6.1
Conservative	Oliver Owen	791		
Plaid Cymru	Gillian Green	335	9.4	−2.4
Plaid Cymru	Heulwen James	312		
Green	Benedict Frude	132	3.7	N/A
Independent	Steve West	114	3.2	N/A
Christian Party (Wales)	Derek Thomson	64	1.8	N/A
Turnout		3,436	46.8	−3.6
Registered electors		7,342		
Liberal Democrats hold		Swing		
Liberal Democrats hold		Swing		

=== Llandaff North (2 seats) ===
Llandaff North
Party	Candidate	Votes	%	±%
Labour	Siobhan Corria	1,244	47.4	+15.2
Labour	Dilwar Ali	1,156		
Independent	David Cogan	607	23.2	N/A
Independent	Megan Price	507		
Liberal Democrats	Ann Rowland-James*	375	14.3	−26.5
Liberal Democrats	Jacqui Hooper*	356		
Conservative	Joe Trigg	154	5.9	−13.0
Plaid Cymru	Wyn Jones	141	5.4	−2.7
Green	Tim Ware	101	3.9	N/A
Turnout		2,448	42.7	+0.5
Registered electors		5,734		
Labour gain from Liberal Democrats		Swing		
Labour gain from Liberal Democrats		Swing		

=== Llanishen (4 seats) ===
Llanishen
Party	Candidate	Votes	%	±%
Labour	Garry Hunt	2,394	41.0	+11.3
Labour	Phil Bale	2,362		
Labour	Julia Magill	2,302		
Conservative	Andrew Graham	2,033	34.8	−14.3
Labour	James Brinning	1.992		
Conservative	Richard Foley*	1,980		
Conservative	Chris O'Brien	1,948		
Conservative	Richard John	1,782		
Plaid Cymru	Gwynfor Davies	418	7.2	−2.8
UKIP	Lawrence Gwynn	396	6.8	N/A
Plaid Cymru	Lona Roberts	384		
Green	Linda Atkins	313	5.4	N/A
Plaid Cymru	Emma Caresimo	308		
Liberal Democrats	Molly Hughes	286	4.9	−6.3
Liberal Democrats	Patricia Rees	268		
Plaid Cymru	Vito Caresimo	246		
Liberal Democrats	Ann Hyde	222		
Liberal Democrats	Judith Ahmed	215		
Turnout		5,315	37.1	−9.1
Registered electors		13,400		
Labour gain from Conservative		Swing		
Labour gain from Conservative		Swing		
Labour gain from Conservative		Swing		
Conservative hold		Swing		

=== Llanrumney (3 seats) ===
Llanrumney
Party	Candidate	Votes	%	±%
Labour	Heather Joyce*	1,671	68.0	+25.7
Labour	Keith Jones	1,653		
Labour	Derrick Morgan*	1,643		
Conservative	John Driscoll	353	14.4	−10.0
Conservative	Wes Jones	318		
Conservative	Dai Lowsy	291		
Plaid Cymru	Colin Lewis	269	11.0	−17.2
Plaid Cymru	Baindu Foday	186		
Plaid Cymru	David Reeves	134		
Green	Bethan Lloyd	94	3.8	N/A
Liberal Democrats	Malcolm Evans	69	2.8	−2.3
Liberal Democrats	Matthew Batten	66		
Liberal Democrats	Michael Rees	62		
Turnout		2,386	29.6	−3.4
Registered electors		8,049		
Labour hold		Swing		
Labour hold		Swing		
Labour hold		Swing		

=== Pentwyn (4 seats) ===
Pentwyn
Party	Candidate	Votes	%	±%
Liberal Democrats	Judith Woodman*	1,633	43.8	−6.3
Liberal Democrats	Joseph Carter*	1,563		
Liberal Democrats	Keith Hyde*	1,557		
Liberal Democrats	Paul Chaundy*	1,546		
Labour	David Haines	1,406	37.7	+13.5
Labour	Michael Imperato	1,267		
Labour	Bernie Bowen-Thomson	1,262		
Labour	Jasminc Chowdhury	1,249		
Conservative	Kathleen Fisher	256	6.9	−8.7
Conservative	Michael Prothero	254		
Conservative	Susan Williams	232	2.4	−13.2
Conservative	Lizzie Lumley	217		
Plaid Cymru	Gwenno George	173	4.6	N/A
Green	Megan David	167	4.5	N/A
Plaid Cymru	Elin Llyr	150		
Plaid Cymru	Meic Peterson	146		
Plaid Cymru	John Roberts	134		
Communist	Steve Williams	91	2.4	N/A
Turnout		3,604	31.0	−3.5
Registered electors		10,774		
Liberal Democrats hold		Swing		
Liberal Democrats hold		Swing		
Liberal Democrats hold		Swing		
Liberal Democrats hold		Swing		

=== Pentyrch (1 seat) ===
Pentyrch
Party	Candidate	Votes	%	±%
Conservative	Craig Williams	772	54.4	+20.0
Labour	Christine Priday	413	29.1	−1.7
Plaid Cymru	Penri Williams	171	12.1	−7.7
Green	Lucy Hiscox	40	2.8	N/A
Liberal Democrats	Adam Evans	22	1.6	−6.3
Turnout		1,426	52.3	+1.5
Registered electors		2,729		
Conservative hold		Swing		

=== Penylan (3 seats) ===
Penylan
Party	Candidate	Votes	%	±%
Liberal Democrats	Tricia Burfoot*	2,173	48.1	−1.5
Liberal Democrats	Bill Kelloway*	2,131		
Liberal Democrats	Joe Boyle	2,101		
Labour	Michael Fogg	1,176	26.0	+11.3
Labour	Reece Emmitt	1,158		
Labour	Akbar Mookhtiar	929		
Conservative	Peter Hudson	446	9.9	−6.7
Conservative	Roland Hemingway	440		
Conservative	Michael Wallbank	379		
Green	Kathryn Brock	377	8.3	N/A
Plaid Cymru	Kelvin Evans	349	7.7	+0.1
Plaid Cymru	Ann Miles	268		
Plaid Cymru	Malachy McEvoy	237		
Turnout		4,215	41.5	−3.3
Registered electors		10,161		
Liberal Democrats hold		Swing		
Liberal Democrats hold		Swing		
Liberal Democrats hold		Swing		

=== Plasnewydd (4 seats) ===
Plasnewydd
Party	Candidate	Votes	%	±%
Labour	Susan Lent	1,535	36.8	+7.5
Labour	Daniel De'ath	1,438		
Labour	Mary McGarry	1,436		
Labour	Mohammad Javed	1,413		
Liberal Democrats	Rodney Berman*	1,362	32.7	−4.3
Liberal Democrats	Geraldine Nichols	1,314		
Liberal Democrats	Richard Jerrett*	1,297		
Liberal Democrats	Elgan Morgan*	1,236		
Green	Anthony Matthews	535	12.8	−0.4
Plaid Cymru	Mohammed Ali	505	12.1	−1.2
Plaid Cymru	Mohammed Hannan	434		
Plaid Cymru	Ned Parish	344		
Plaid Cymru	Ian Mullis	338		
Conservative	Enid Harries	232	5.6	−4.1
Conservative	Hannah Moscrop	193		
Conservative	Aled Jones-Pritchard	174		
Conservative	Marc Gonzalez	171		
Turnout		3,815	27.7	+0.6
Registered electors		13,792		
Labour gain from Liberal Democrats		Swing		
Labour gain from Liberal Democrats		Swing		
Labour gain from Liberal Democrats		Swing		
Labour gain from Liberal Democrats		Swing		

=== Pontprennau and Old St. Mellons (2 seats) ===
Pontprennau & Old St. Mellons
Party	Candidate	Votes	%	±%
Labour	Georgina Phillips	1,326	49.0	+8.4
Conservative	Dianne Rees*	1,004	37.1	−13.5
Labour	Mark Watkins	993		
Conservative	Jane Rogers*	940		
Liberal Democrats	Edward Wilson	141	5.2	−3.6
Plaid Cymru	Mauro Caresimo	130	4.8	N/A
Green	Matthew Lovett	107	4.0	N/A
Liberal Democrats	Charles Woodman	79		
Plaid Cymru	Ceri Tegwyn	73		
Turnout		2,538	35.9	−4.4
Registered electors		7,063		
Labour gain from Conservative		Swing		
Conservative hold		Swing		

=== Radyr (1 seat) ===
Radyr and Morganstown
Party	Candidate	Votes	%	±%
Conservative	Roderick McKerlich*	1,215	53.3	−6.9
Labour	Moray Grant	738	32.4	+12.7
Plaid Cymru	Ian Hughes	164	7.2	−2.4
Liberal Democrats	Laura Pearcy	95	4.2	−6.3
Green	Zabelle Aslanyan	68	3.0	N/A
Turnout		2,278	45.7	−5.8
Registered electors		4,986		
Conservative hold		Swing		

=== Rhiwbina (3 seats) ===
Rhiwbina
Party	Candidate	Votes	%	±%
Independent	Jayne Cowan*	3,808	68.9	+13.8
Independent	Adrian Robson*	3,680		
Independent	Eleanor Sanders	3,420		
Conservative	Adam Johns	643	11.6	−14.3
Labour	Andrew Newton	631	11.4	+2.5
Labour	Geraint Denison	611		
Conservative	Leslie Hopkins	560		
Labour	Steven Cushen	521		
Conservative	John Lancaster	507		
Plaid Cymru	Christopher Davies	225	4.1	+0.1
Green	Daniel Bearpark	140	2.5	−0.7
Liberal Democrats	Peter Borrow	78	1.4	−1.6
Liberal Democrats	Emma-Jayne Sandrey	67		
Liberal Democrats	Charlotte Lightman	52		
Turnout		5,087	55.2	−7.1
Registered electors		9,220		
Independent hold		Swing		
Independent hold		Swing		
Independent hold		Swing		

=== Riverside (3 seats) ===
Riverside
Party	Candidate	Votes	%	±%
Labour	Iona Gordon	1,731	46.7	+14.3
Labour	Cecilia Love	1,555		
Labour	Phil Hawkins	1,431		
Plaid Cymru	Mohammed Islam*	1,153	31.1	−12.8
Plaid Cymru	Jaswant Singh*	944		
Plaid Cymru	Haf Roberts	940		
Green	Ceri Hughes	294	7.9	N/A
Conservative	Jennifer Lay	286	7.7	−4.5
Conservative	Michael Bryan	276		
Green	Yvan Maurel	272		
Conservative	Gaener Davies	263		
Green	Jan Tucker	189		
Liberal Democrats	Gwilym Owen	142	3.8	−7.7
Liberal Democrats	Jeremy Townsend	129		
Liberal Democrats	Eleri Randerson	122		
TUSC	Garmon Gruffudd	99	2.7	N/A
Turnout		3,468	37.2	−2.7
Registered electors		9,327		
Labour hold		Swing		
Labour gain from Plaid Cymru		Swing		
Labour gain from Plaid Cymru		Swing		

=== Rumney (2 seats) ===
Duncan Macdonald had been elected as a Conservative in 2008.

Rumney
Party	Candidate	Votes	%	±%
Labour	Jacqueline Parry	1,095	48.4	+6.8
Labour	Robert Derbyshire	1,087		
Conservative	John Ireland*	625	27.7	−21.5
Conservative	Phillip James	473		
Independent	Duncan MacDonald*	262	11.6	N/A
Plaid Cymru	Ian Jones	78	3.4	N/A
Plaid Cymru	Chad Rickard	63		
Christian Party (Wales)	Dave Pritchard	57	2.5	N/A
Green	Jack Price	53	2.3	N/A
Liberal Democrats	Anabella Rees	48	2.1	−7.1
TUSC	Andrew Wilkes	43	1.9	N/A
Liberal Democrats	Elizabeth Woodman	37		
Turnout		2,067	31.5	−3.0
Registered electors		6,565		
Labour gain from Conservative		Swing		
Labour gain from Conservative		Swing		

=== Splott (3 seats) ===
Splott
Party	Candidate	Votes	%	±%
Labour	Luke Holland	1,686	47.9	+8.3
Labour	Huw Thomas	1,624		
Labour	Gretta Marshall	1,432		
Liberal Democrats	Gavin Cox*	1,055	30.0	−9.7
Liberal Democrats	Bablin Molik	815		
Liberal Democrats	Anna White	775		
Plaid Cymru	Jebun Choudhury	250	7.1	−0.2
Plaid Cymru	Ioan Bellin	197		
Plaid Cymru	Patrick Daley	167		
Green	Kelda Rimington	157	4.5	N/A
Conservative	Margaret Evans	151	4.3	−5.6
Conservative	Janine Jones-Pritchard	137		
Conservative	Kyle Smith	130		
Communist	Robert Griffiths	117	3.3	−0.1
TUSC	James Connolly	105	3.0	N/A
Turnout		3,161	33.5	−4.9
Registered electors		9,426		
Labour hold		Swing		
Labour hold		Swing		
Labour gain from Liberal Democrats		Swing		

=== Trowbridge (3 seats) ===
Trowbridge
Party	Candidate	Votes	%	±%
Labour	Ralph Cook	1,619	58.5	+22.0
Labour	Monica Walsh	1,535		
Labour	Michael Costas-Michael	1,380		
Liberal Democrats	Emma Woodman	388	14.0	−19.3
Conservative	Michelle Michaelis	372	13.4	−1.3
Conservative	Pamela Cunningham	367		
Conservative	Wayne Cashin	358		
Plaid Cymru	Leanne Lennox	292	10.5	N/A
Liberal Democrats	Jacqui Sullivan	255		
Liberal Democrats	Ian Walton	244		
Plaid Cymru	Leigh Canham	188		
Plaid Cymru	Joshua Parry	178		
Green	Piers Leveroni	98	3.5	N/A
Turnout		2,614	23.6	−6.9
Registered electors		11,094		
Labour hold		Swing		
Labour hold		Swing		
Labour gain from Liberal Democrats		Swing		

=== Whitchurch and Tongwynlais (4 seats) ===
Whitchurch & Tongwynlais
Party	Candidate	Votes	%	±%
Labour	Jonathan Evans	2,529	41.2	+4.7
Labour	Chris Davis	2,454		
Labour	Benjamin Thomas	2,354		
Labour	David Groves	2,290		
Conservative	Linda Morgan*	2,206	36.0	−4.5
Conservative	Timothy Davies*	2,144		
Conservative	Brian Griffiths*	2,080		
Conservative	Michael Jones-Pritchard*	2,080		
Plaid Cymru	John Rowlands	641	10.4	−0.2
Plaid Cymru	Heulwen Jones	623		
Plaid Cymru	Ceri Morgan	600		
Plaid Cymru	Dewi Owen	588		
Green	Paul Atkins	495	8.1	N/A
Liberal Democrats	Joyce Lentern	265	4.3	−2.6
Liberal Democrats	Matthew Harries	233		
Liberal Democrats	Ruth Abbott	226		
Liberal Democrats	Mark Rees	183		
Turnout		5,894	45.4	−7.7
Registered electors		12,970		
Labour gain from Conservative		Swing		
Labour gain from Conservative		Swing		
Labour gain from Conservative		Swing		
Labour gain from Conservative		Swing		

== By-elections between 2012 and 2017 ==
=== Riverside ===
Riverside by-election, 5 December 2013
Party	Candidate	Votes	%	±%
Labour	Darren Williams	1,120	50.3	+3.6
Plaid Cymru	Elizabeth Gould	773	34.7	+3.6
Conservative	Aled Crow	107	4.8	−2.9
UKIP	Simon Zeigler	97	4.4	N/A
TUSC	Christopher Beer	70	3.1	+0.5
Liberal Democrats	Sian Donne	58	2.6	−1.2
Majority		347	15.6	±0.0
Turnout		2,225	22.6	−14.6
Registered electors		9,860		
Labour hold		Swing		

The by-election was caused by the resignation of Labour councillor Phil Hawkins for personal reasons.

=== Splott ===
Splott by-election, 5 December 2013
Party	Candidate	Votes	%	±%
Labour	Edward Stubbs	706	39.1	−8.7
Liberal Democrats	Jamie Matthews	604	33.5	+3.5
UKIP	George Morris	209	11.6	N/A
Independent	Elys John	94	5.2	N/A
Conservative	Daniel Mason	86	4.8	+0.5
TUSC	Katrine Williams	80	6.1	+3.2
Majority		102	5.6	−12.3
Turnout		1,779	18.1	−15.4
Registered electors		9,846		
Labour hold		Swing		

A by-election was caused by the resignation of Labour councillor Luke Holland following accusations of non-attendance at council meetings. He stated that he planned to move to London.

=== Canton ===
Canton by-election, 21 February 2014
Party	Candidate	Votes	%	±%
Labour	Susan Elsmore	1,201	41.7	−5.9
Plaid Cymru	Elin Tudur	972	33.7	+14.3
Conservative	Pamela Richards	381	13.2	+2.4
Green	David Griffiths	148	5.1	−10.5
TUSC	Steffan Bateman	101	3.5	+1.6
Liberal Democrats	Matthew Hemsley	80	2.8	+0.3
Majority		229	8.0	−20.2
Turnout		2,883	24.3	−17.0
Registered electors		11,915		
Labour hold		Swing		

The by-election was caused by the resignation of Labour Councillor Cerys Furlong on 30 December 2013.

=== Llandaff North ===
Llandaff North by-election, 2 October 2014
Party	Candidate	Votes	%	±%
Labour	Susan White	898	50.1	+2.7
Independent	David Coggins-Cogan	419	23.4	+0.2
UKIP	Simon Zeigler	204	11.4	N/A
Conservative	Peter Hudson	136	7.6	+1.7
Liberal Democrats	Ann Rowland-James	134	7.5	−6.8
Majority		479	26.7	+2.5
Turnout		1,791	30.0	−12.7
Registered electors		5,991		
Labour hold		Swing		

The by-election was caused by the resignation of Labour councillor Siobhan Corria for personal reasons.

=== Pentyrch ===
Pentyrch by-election, 30 June 2015
Party	Candidate	Votes	%	±%
Conservative	Gavin Hill-John	561	40.5	−12.5
Plaid Cymru	Hywel Wigley	543	39.2	+26.7
Labour	Paul Fisher	234	16.9	−13.4
Independent	Munawar Mughal	24	1.7	N/A
Green	Ruth Osner	22	1.6	−1.3
Liberal Democrats	Cadan ap Tomos	10	0.7	−0.9
Majority		18	1.3	−24.0
Turnout		1,394	49.9	−2.4
Registered electors		2,800		
Conservative hold		Swing		

The by-election was caused by the resignation of Conservative Councillor Craig Williams, following his election as MP for Cardiff North.

=== Riverside ===
Riverside by-election, 7 October 2015
Party	Candidate	Votes	%	±%
Labour	Caro Wild	1,071	45.9	−0.8
Plaid Cymru	Ruksana Begum	780	33.5	+2.3
Conservative	Sean Driscoll	155	6.6	−1.1
UKIP	Gareth Bennett	110	4.7	N/A
Green	Hannah Pudner	109	4.7	−3.3
Liberal Democrats	Gwilym Owen	85	3.6	−0.2
TUSC	Steffan Bateman	21	0.9	−1.8
Majority		291	12.4	−3.2
Turnout		2,331	23.9	−13.3
Registered electors		9,758		
Labour hold		Swing		

The by-election was caused by the resignation of Labour councillor Cecilia Love for family reasons.

=== Plasnewydd ===
Plasnewydd by-election, 20 September 2016
Party	Candidate	Votes	%	±%
Liberal Democrats	Robin Rea	1,258	48.1	+16.9
Labour	Peter Wong	910	34.8	−0.3
Plaid Cymru	Glenn Page	177	6.8	−4.8
Conservative	Munawar Mughal	115	4.4	−5.5
Green	Michael Cope	93	3.6	−8.7
UKIP	Lawrence Gwynn	62	2.4	N/A
Majority		348	13.3	N/A
Turnout		2,615	23.1	−4.6
Registered electors		11,356		
Liberal Democrats gain from Labour		Swing		

The by-election was caused by the death of Labour councillor Mohammed Javed.

=== Grangetown ===
Grangetown by-election, 3 November 2016
Party	Candidate	Votes	%	±%
Plaid Cymru	Tariq Awan	1,163	42.0	+8.5
Labour	Maliika Kaaba	1,049	37.9	−2.2
Conservative	Michael Bryan	287	10.4	+3.5
UKIP	Richard Lewis	141	5.1	N/A
Liberal Democrats	Asghar Ali	127	4.6	−6.6
Majority		114	4.1	N/A
Turnout		2,767	21.7	−12.4
Registered electors		12,754		
Plaid Cymru gain from Labour		Swing		

The by-election was caused by the death of Labour councillor Chris Lomax.

== Defections 2012–17 ==
- In April 2013 Gabalfa Councillor Gareth Holden resigned from The Lib Dems to sit as an independent and later joined Plaid Cymru.
- In June 2015 Rhiwbina Councillors Jayne Cowan and Adrian Robson both rejoined the Conservatives.
- In January 2016 Trowbridge Councillor Ralph Cook left Labour to sit as an independent. In 2017 he contested his seat for the Lib Dems.
- In May 2016 Llanrumny Councillor Derrick Morgan left the Labour group and sat as an independent.
- In August 2016 Splott Councillor Gretta Marshell resigned from Labour to sit as an independent and later joined Plaid Cymru
- In early 2017 Adamsdown Councillor Manzoor Ahmed was deselected by Labour and joined the Lib Dems.

== Vacant seats by 2017 local election ==
Three seats were vacant by the end of the term caused by the resignation of Margaret Jones (Lib Dem) in Cyncoed, the resignation of Susan White (Labour) in Llandaff North and the death of Derrick Morgan (elected as Labour, then sitting as an Independent) in Llanrumny, all of happened within six months of the 2017 election, so no by-elections were held.
