= Dafydd Huws =

Dafydd John Lewys Huws (29 November 1935 – 3 July 2011) was a Welsh politician and psychiatrist who was also a pioneer and advocate of wind turbines in Wales.

== Career ==
Huws was a medical student in Cardiff and spent his career as a psychiatrist in the area. He developed a special interest in how people cope with stress and adversity. Huws became medical director of Cardiff Community NHS Trust and was regularly sought for talks and media interviews about current topics in psychiatry.

== Politics ==
In 1969 Huws became the first Plaid Cymru councillor on Cardiff Council, representing the Plasmawr ward. He stood against George Thomas in the Cardiff West constituency during the general elections of June 1970, February 1974, and October 1974, and also stood for the Ceredigion seat in 1979 and also Cardiff in 1983. He stood for the South Wales constituency in the European Parliament election of 1984, winning 13,201 votes (6.8% of the total). He was national chair of Plaid Cymru in the 1980s and received a posthumous award given to his widow Rhian in the annual conference of the party in September 2011.

== Wind energy ==
With his wife, Rhian, he founded the Ynni Amgen Cyf company and was responsible for one of the first wind farms in Wales on Mynydd Gorddu, near Tal-y-bont, Ceredigion.
