= Central (Cardiff electoral ward) =

- Electoral ward
- Country: Wales
- County: Glamorgan ( -1974); South Glamorgan (1974- )
- Town/City: Cardiff
- UK parliamentary constituency: Cardiff ( -1918); Cardiff Central (1918–1950,1983- ) Cardiff North (1950–1983)

Government
  - Councillors: 3 (1890-1974); 2 (1974–1985); 1 (1985–1996)

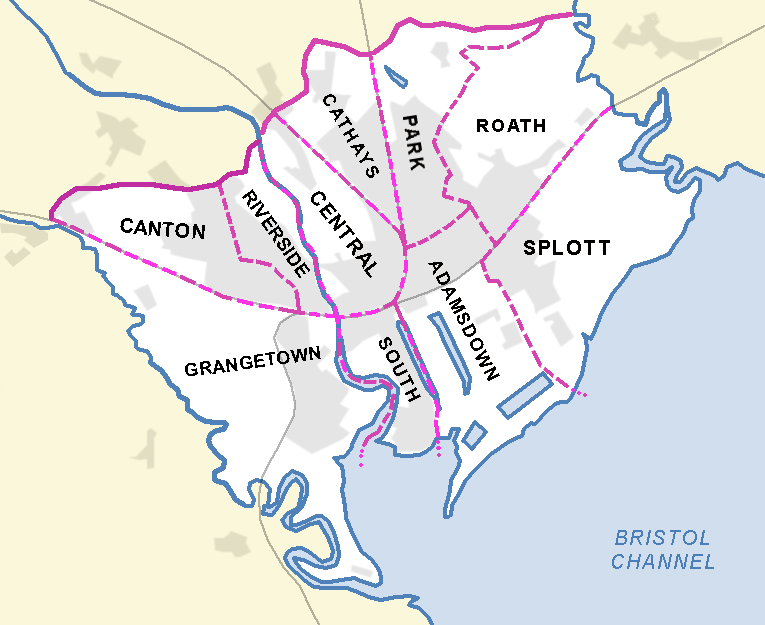
Wards of Cardiff, 1890

Central was the name of an original electoral ward in the centre of the county borough and, from 1905, city of Cardiff, Wales. It elected representatives to the Cardiff County Borough Council and, from 1974, South Glamorgan County Council. The ward ceased to exist in 1996.

== Description and background ==
In July 1890, following the creation of Cardiff County Borough Council, Central was a new electoral ward created, one of the ten in the county borough. The ward was bordered to the west by the River Taff, to the east by the Taff Vale Railway and to the south by the Great Western Railway line. The Riverside ward lay on the other side of the River Taff, the Cathays ward to the northeast (of the Taff Vale Railway) and the South ward lay to the south.

Before the electoral reforms of the 20th century, councillors were elected by burgesses i.e. ratepayers in the ward.

The electorate of the Central ward in 1985 was 4217, increasing to 4908 in 1993.

The Cathays ward was expanded to incorporate the area of the Central ward in 1996.

== South Glamorgan County Council 1973-1996 ==
In 1973 elections were held for the new South Glamorgan County Council. The Central ward continued as a ward to this authority, electing two county councillors in 1973, 1977 and 1981, then one county councillor from 1985.

The party representing Central changed at every election, from Labour in 1973, to Conservative in 1977, back to Labour in 1981, Liberal in 1985, back to Labour in 1983, then finally Liberal Democrat in 1993.

=== 1993 ===
South Glamorgan Council election 1993
Party	Candidate	Votes	%	±%
Liberal Democrats	R. Rowland	704	43.1	+3.1
Labour	C. Champion *	642	39.3	−3.0
Conservative	(Ms) C. Baker	119	7.3	−4.9
Green	N. Clark	86	5.3	+5.3
Plaid Cymru	T. O'Neill	83	5.1	−0.4
Turnout				
Liberal Democrats gain from Labour		Swing		

Central's Liberal Democrat Cllr Rowland stood in the Cathays ward in the 1995 City and County of Cardiff election, but was not successful.

== Cardiff County Borough Council 1889-1974 ==
Until Cardiff County Borough was superseded in 1974, the three ward councillors took turns to stand down for re-election. Initially (with annual Cardiff elections prior to World War II) on a three-yearly cycle.

=== 1970 ===
At the local elections on 7 May 1970 (the final elections to the county borough council), Labour recovered some ground on the Conservative Party, winning back seats in the city. The Conservative Lady Mayoress, Mary Hallinan, had represented the Central ward for the previous nine years and was the most prominent casualty in the election, losing her seat to Labour's Bill Herbert. Herbert was chairman of the Cardiff United Residents' Association and a leading campaigner against the proposed new hook road.

Cardiff Council election 1970
Party	Candidate	Votes	%	±%
Labour	William Penry Herbert	1,385		
Conservative	Mary Hallinan *	1,090		
Liberal	Richard Michael James	186		
Plaid Cymru	Denis O'Neill	152		
Ratepayer	Denis George Parberry	35		
Labour gain from Conservative		Swing		

=== 1890–2 ===
In November 1890, following the redistribution of councillors across the ten Cardiff wards, Central (like the South ward having many businesses and non-resident ratepayer voters) lost the long-standing Liberal councillor to the Conservatives. The result was declared from the rear of the Town Hall and the margin was only two votes. Mr Proger, a master plumber by trade, had been a member of the council for the previous 12 years.

Cardiff Council election 1890
Party	Candidate	Votes	%	±%
Conservative	Walter Raleigh Parker	617		
Liberal	J. Guy Proger *	615		
Conservative gain from Liberal		Swing		

In 1891 the Conservative candidate also won against the sitting Liberal councillor.

* = retiring ward councillor for re-election

== Succession ==
The Central ward was replaced from 1974 on the new Cardiff City Council by an expanded Cathays ward. The boundary of Cathays ward expanded to include the city centre (and Castle community). Several of the Central ward councillors on South Glamorgan County Council also represented the Cathays ward concurrently.
