= Philip Dunleavy =

British politician (1915–1996)

Philip Dunleavy CBE (5 October 1915 - 13 January 1996) was a Labour Party councillor in Cardiff, Wales. He was Lord Mayor of Cardiff 1982-83 and leader of Cardiff City Council for five years.

== Biography ==
Dunleavy was born in Cardiff and began working for the Post Office when he was 14 years old. He continued working for them until his retirement in 1975.

As a Labour Party councillor, he served on Cardiff City Council from 1962 to 1983 and was Leader of the Council from 1974 to 1976 and 1979-82. He also served on South Glamorgan County Council from 1974 to 1981. In 1982 he became Lord Mayor of Cardiff.

Dunleavy was awarded an OBE in 1978 and a CBE in 1983 for "services to local government in South Glamorgan". In January 1993 he was bestowed the honour of the Freedom of the City of Cardiff, one of only two people to receive this honour during the 1990s.

Dunleavy died in Cardiff on 13 January 1996. In tribute the local MP and Labour national home affairs spokesman, Alun Michael, said Dunleavy "towered over Cardiff's political landscape".
