= Rhiwbina (electoral ward) =

Rhiwbina ward
- Community/Electoral ward
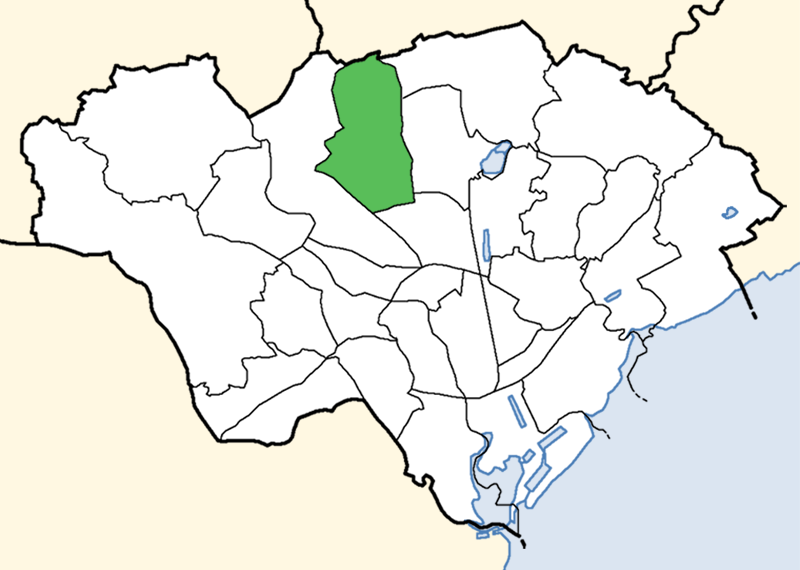
- Location of Rhiwbina ward within Cardiff
- Population: 11,369 (2011 census)
- Principal area: Cardiff
- Country: Wales
- Sovereign state: United Kingdom
- Post town: CARDIFF
- Postcode district: CF14
- Dialling code: +44-29
- UK Parliament: Cardiff North
- Senedd Cymru – Welsh Parliament: Cardiff North
- Councillors: 3

Rhiwbina is an electoral ward in the north of Cardiff, capital city of Wales. It covers the community of the same name.

== Background ==
Rhiwbina became a ward to Cardiff City Council in 1967, after it was transferred from the Cardiff Rural District. It elected Conservative councillors for 28 years, until the 1995 elections to the new City and County of Cardiff Council saw Labour win all three seats.

== Description ==
Rhiwbina is both an electoral ward, and a community. There is no community council for the area.

The Rhiwbina ward is bordered to the west by the Whitchurch & Tongwynlais, to the east by the Llanishen and Lisvane wards. To the south is Cardiff's Heath ward, while Caerphilly's St Martins ward is immediately to the north.

The Rhiwbina ward elects three councillors to Cardiff Council. Since 1999 it has been represented by the Conservative Party or ex-Conservative Party members standing as Independents. In May 2012 independent councillor Jayne Cowan attracted more votes (3,808) than any other local election candidate in Wales. In June 2015 she rejoined the Conservative Party in the hope of standing in the Welsh Assembly elections. Fellow Rhiwbina councillor (also husband of Cllr Cowan) Adrian Robson also rejoined the Tories, in the hope of taking control of Cardiff Council from the Labour Party.

== County councillors ==
Representation 1995 – date
Election	Conservative	Independent	Labour
2017	3		
2012		3	
2008		3	
2004	3		
1999	3		
1995			3

=== May 2017 ===
2017 Cardiff Council election
Party	Candidate	Votes	%	±%
Conservative	Jayne Louise Cowan **	3,595	22%	
Conservative	Adrian Robert Robson **	3,230	20%	
Conservative	Oliver William Owen	2,565	16%	
Independent	Eleanor Sanders **	1,565	10%	
Labour	Meurig Williams	1,524	9%	
Labour	Clare Frances Jones	1,500	9%	
Labour	Alan Golding	1,159	7%	
Plaid Cymru	Stephen Edward Lake	402	2%	
Liberal Democrats	Jonathan Land	371	3%	
Liberal Democrats	Philippa Wendy Willmot	198	1%	
Liberal Democrats	Dale Hargrove	170	1%	
Turnout			62%	

** = sitting councillor prior to the election, elected as an independent at the previous election
