= Splott (electoral ward) =

Splott ward
- Electoral ward
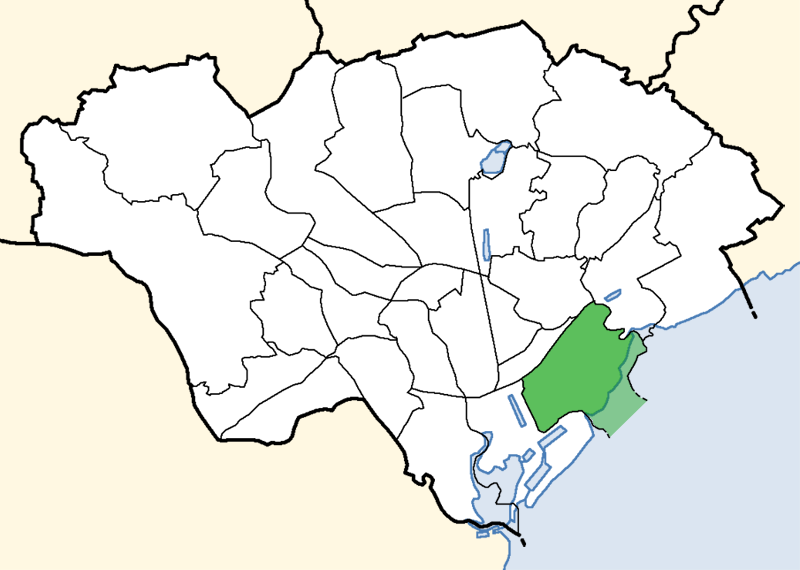
- Location of Splott ward within Cardiff
- Population: 13,261 (2011 census)
- Community: Splott/Tremorfa
- Principal area: Cardiff
- Country: Wales
- Sovereign state: United Kingdom
- Post town: CARDIFF
- Postcode district: CF24
- Dialling code: +44-29
- UK Parliament: Cardiff South and Penarth
- Senedd Cymru – Welsh Parliament: Caerdydd Penarth
- Councillors: 3

Splott is an electoral ward in the south of Cardiff, capital city of Wales. It covers the communities of Splott and Tremorfa (which was created from the northeastern part of Splott in 2016).

== Description ==
The Splott ward is bordered to the north by the Penylan and Rumney wards, to the northwest by Adamsdown, to the southwest by the Butetown ward. To the southeast is the Severn Estuary.

The Splott ward elected two councillors to Cardiff Council in 1995 and has elected three councillors since 1999. It has been represented by the Labour Party and the Liberal Democrats. In May 2012 all three seats were won by a new team of Labour councillors, after a bitter campaign where the Liberal Democrats making a complaint to the police that Labour candidate, Luke Holland, had given a misleading address on his notice of poll.

Splott councillor Huw Thomas became leader of the Labour-controlled Cardiff Council in May 2017. Lord Jack Brooks, who became leader of South Glamorgan County Council, was a Splott councillor during the 80s and 90s.

Cardiff's first ethnic minority councillor, Manuel Delgado, was elected for Labour in the Splott ward in May 1967. Of Cape Verdean heritage, Delgado is also claimed as the first black councillor in Wales. He also became Cardiff's first black magistrate in 1969.

== County councillors ==
Representation 1995 – date
| Election | Labour | Lib Dem |
| 2022 | 3 | - |
| 2017 | 3 | - |
| 2012 | 3 | - |
| 2008 | 2 | 1 |
| 2004 | 1 | 2 |
| 1999 | 3 | - |
| 1995 | 2 | - |

=== 2026 by-election ===
The by-election was held on 9 July 2026. Councillor Huw Thomas, Cardiff Council leader, had resigned after his election to the Senedd in May 2026. Labour retained the seat, beating the Greens into second place by 87 votes.

Splott by-election: 9 July 2026
| Party | Candidate | Votes | % | ±% |
|---|---|---|---|---|
| Labour | James Caruana | 765 | 40.1 | +6.1 |
| Green | Simran Patel | 678 | 35.5 | +18.2 |
| Reform | David John Cook | 286 | 15.0 | +2.0 |
| Liberal Democrats | Rhys William Husband | 114 | 6.0 | −8.0 |
| Conservative | Charles Agbakahi | 54 | 2.8 | –0.1 |
| Majority | | 87 | | |
| Turnout | | 1,907 | 17.7 | –1.8 |
| Registered electors | | 10,762 | | |
| Labour hold | | Swing | | |

== Cardiff County Borough Council ==
Prior to 1890 the Splott area was covered by the East ward of Cardiff. In July 1890, following the creation of Cardiff County Borough Council, Splott was the name of one of the ten new electoral wards created in the county borough. Each of the three councillors took turns to stand for re-election, on a three-yearly cycle.
