= Riverside (Cardiff electoral ward) =

Riverside ward
- Electoral ward
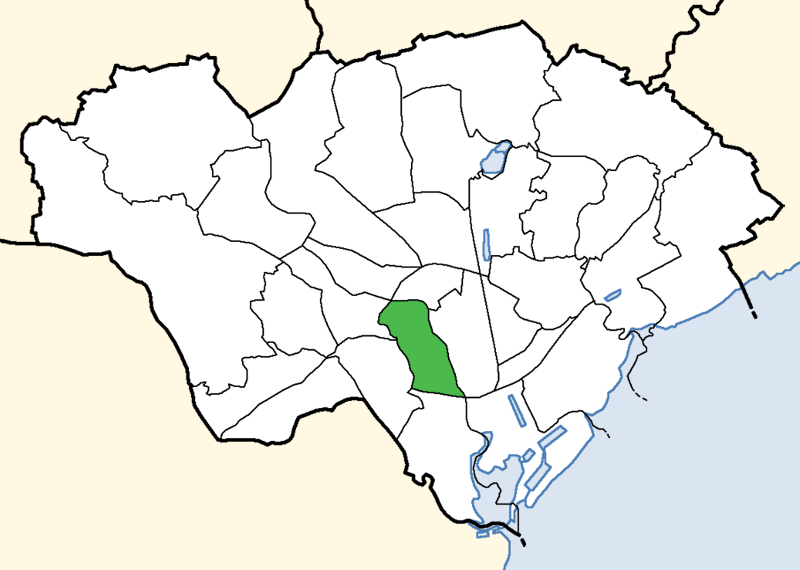
- Location of Riverside ward within Cardiff
- Population: 13,771 (2011 census)
- Principal area: Cardiff
- Country: Wales
- Sovereign state: United Kingdom
- Post town: CARDIFF
- Postcode district: CF11
- Dialling code: +44-29
- UK Parliament: Cardiff West
- Senedd Cymru – Welsh Parliament: Caerdydd Penarth
- Councillors: 3

The Riverside electoral ward of Cardiff covers the Riverside and Pontcanna areas of the city, electing three councillors to Cardiff Council. The ward was originally created in 1890, as a ward to Cardiff County Borough Council.

== Description ==
The Riverside ward includes the communities of Riverside and Pontcanna, which are located immediately west of Cardiff city centre and the River Taff. According to the 2011 census the population of the ward was 13,771.

The boundary of the electoral ward initially matched that of the Riverside community. However, Pontcanna saw itself as distinctly different, with its smart Victorian houses and villas surrounding Cathedral Road despite these existing in other, 'less desirable', parts of Riverside like Fitzhamon Embankment or Lower Cathedral Road. In November 2016 the northern two-thirds of the ward became a separate Pontcanna community.

Riverside is bounded by the wards of Cathays to the east, Grangetown to the south; Canton and Llandaff to the west. There is no community council for the area.

It is located in the parliamentary constituency of Cardiff West and (since 2026) the Senedd constituency of Caerdydd Penarth.

== Representatives ==
=== 2017 ===
2017 Cardiff Council election
| Party | Candidate | Votes | % | ±% |
|---|---|---|---|---|
| Labour | Iona Gordon * | 2,278 | 19% | |
| Labour | Caro Wild * | 2,050 | 17% | |
| Labour | Kanaya Singh | 1,941 | 16% | |
| Plaid Cymru | Ruksana Begum | 1,126 | 9% | |
| Plaid Cymru | Richard Williams | 1,054 | 9% | |
| Plaid Cymru | Mubashar Khan | 959 | 8% | |
| Conservative | Jason Griffin | 510 | 4% | |
| Conservative | Leon Bancroft | 464 | 4% | |
| Conservative | Gaener Davies | 415 | 3% | |
| Liberal Democrats | Alun Williams | 401 | 3% | |
| Green | Ken Barker | 400 | 3% | |
| Liberal Democrats | Molik Ahmed | 225 | 2% | |
| Liberal Democrats | Callum Littlemore | 218 | 2% | |
| Independent | Ahmed Alsisi | 86 | 1% | |
| Turnout | | | 45% | |

=== 2015 by-election ===
Labour councillor Cecilia Love resigned her seat in August 2015 for family reasons causing a by-election, which was won on 7 October 2015 by Labour candidate Caro Wild.

=== 2012 ===
After a "bitter" campaign Plaid Cymru lost their remaining two ward seats to the Labour Party, with sitting Labour councillor Iona Gordon topping the poll.

2012 Cardiff Council election
| Party | Candidate | Votes | % | ±% |
|---|---|---|---|---|
| Labour | Iona Gordon * | 1,731 | 18% | |
| Labour | Cecilia Love | 1,555 | 16% | |
| Labour | Philip Hawkins | 1,431 | 15% | |
| Plaid Cymru | Mohammed Islam * | 1,153 | 12% | |
| Plaid Cymru | Jaswant Singh * | 944 | 10% | |
| Plaid Cymru | Haf Roberts | 940 | 10% | |
| Green | Ceri Hughes | 294 | 3% | |
| Conservative | Jennifer Lay | 286 | 3% | |
| Conservative | Michael Bryan | 276 | 3% | |
| Green | Yvan Maurel | 272 | 3% | |
| Conservative | Gaener Davies | 263 | 3% | |
| Green | Janet Tucker | 189 | 2% | |
| Liberal Democrats | Gwilym Owen | 142 | 1% | |
| Liberal Democrats | Jeremy Townsend | 129 | 1% | |
| Liberal Democrats | Eleri Randerson | 122 | 1% | |
| TUSC | Garmon Gruffydd | 99 | 1% | |

=== 2011 by-election ===
Plaid Cymru councillor Gwenllian Lansdown resigned her seat in January 2011 after six years representing Riverside, because she had moved from Cardiff to live in Powys. The resulting by-election took place on 3 March 2011, which was won unexpectedly by the Labour candidate, Iona Gordon. The turnout was 39.8%.

=== 2008 ===
2008 Cardiff Council election
| Party | Candidate | Votes | % | ±% |
|---|---|---|---|---|
| Plaid Cymru | Gwenllian Lansdown * | 1,064 | 43.9% | |
| Plaid Cymru | Mohammed S. Islam * | 1,064 | | |
| Plaid Cymru | Jaswant Singh | 991 | | |
| Labour | Mark Drakeford | 786 | 32.4% | |
| Labour | A. Ahmed | 743 | | |
| Labour | S. Evans | 707 | | |
| Conservative | R. Cotty | 295 | 12.2% | |
| Liberal Democrats | M. Hughes | 280 | 11.5% | |
| Liberal Democrats | P. Bale | 250 | | |
| Liberal Democrats | M. Hyde | 235 | | |
| Conservative | S. Awan | 209 | | |
| Conservative | A. Awan | 206 | | |
| Turnout | | | 39.9% | |

== Ward creation ==
In July 1890, following the creation of Cardiff County Borough Council, Riverside was the name of one of the ten new electoral wards created in the county borough. It was briefly known as "Canton South", having been split from the existing Canton ward, which had been growing rapidly. Each of the three councillors took turns to stand for re-election, on a three-yearly cycle.

=== 1890 ===
The first election on 1 November 1890 was unusual because there were contests to elect two councillors rather than one. This was because sitting Conservative Cllr Smith had recently died and an election was needed to elect a replacement. Both elections saw the Liberal Party gain seats from the Conservatives, by small majorities. Noah Rees won Cllr Smith's seat and Dr James defeated sitting councillor, Mr R. Price.

1890 Cardiff County Borough Council election (1)
| Party | Candidate | Votes | % | ±% |
|---|---|---|---|---|
| Liberal | Dr James | 638 | | |
| Conservative | R. Price * | 615 | | |
| Liberal gain from Conservative | | Swing | | |

1890 Cardiff County Borough Council election (2)
| Party | Candidate | Votes | % | ±% |
|---|---|---|---|---|
| Liberal | Noah Rees | 635 | | |
| Conservative | Mr Evans | 605 | | |
| Liberal gain from Conservative | | Swing | | |

* = sitting councillor prior to the election
