= Llanishen (electoral ward) =

Llanishen ward
- Community/Electoral ward
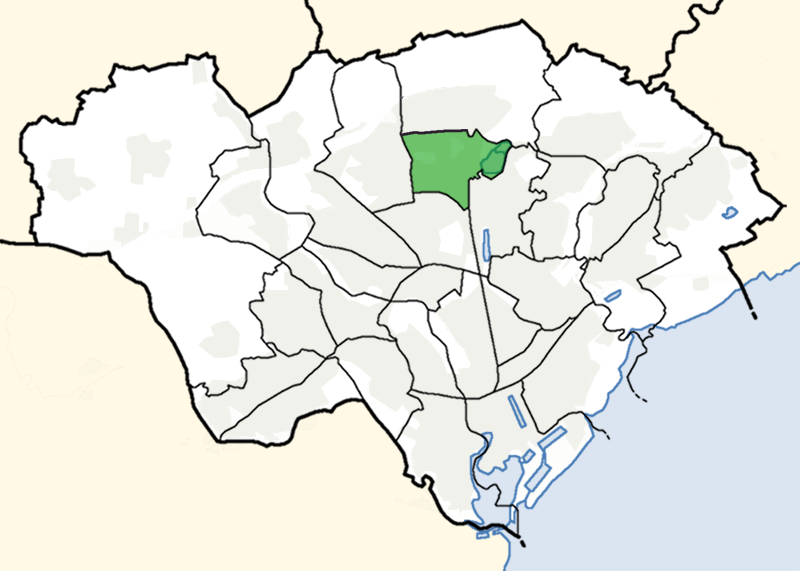
- Location of Llanishen ward within Cardiff
- Population: 17,417 (2011 census)
- Principal area: Cardiff
- Country: Wales
- Sovereign state: United Kingdom
- Post town: CARDIFF
- Postcode district: CF14
- Dialling code: +44-29
- UK Parliament: Cardiff North
- Senedd Cymru – Welsh Parliament: Cardiff North
- Councillors: 2

Llanishen is an electoral ward in the north of Cardiff, capital city of Wales. It covers the community of Llanishen (and until 2022 Thornhill, which was created from the northern half of Llanishen in 2016).

Llanishen is bordered to the north by the Lisvane and Thornhill ward, to the west by Rhiwbina, to the south by the Heath ward and to the southeast by Cyncoed.

The Llanishen ward elects two (formerly four) councillors to Cardiff Council and has been represented by a mixture of Conservative and Labour councillors.

Between 2014 and 2017 Llanishen councillor Phil Bale was the leader of Cardiff Council. On 2 August 2019 Phil Bale announced he was stepping down as councillor triggering a by-election on 21 November 2019. Labour subsequently lost its seat to the Conservative Party.

== 2020 boundary review ==
Following a Cardiff boundary review, intended to give better electoral parity, the new community of Thornhill was transferred from the Llanishen ward to the neighbouring Lisvane ward, effective from the 2022 Cardiff Council election. As a result, Llanishen's representation reduced from 4 to 2 councillors.

== Representation ==
Representation 1973 – date
	Conservative	Ratepayer
1973	6	0
1976	5	1
Election	Conservative	Labour
1979	6	0
1983	3	0
1987	3	0
1991	2	1
1995	1	3
1999	0	4
2004	4	0
2008	4	0
2012	1	3
2017	3	1
2019^{BE}	4	0
2022	0	2

BE = overall standing in the ward following a by-election

One of the four Conservative councillors who had represented the ward since 2004, Bob Smith, resigned from the Conservative party in November 2011, to sit as an Independent. This was in protest at not being re-selected to fight the seat at the May 2012 elections.

== Cardiff Council elections ==
=== 2017 ===
2017 Cardiff Council election
Party	Candidate	Votes	%	±%
Conservative	Shaun Michael Jenkins	2,890	12%	
Labour Co-op	Phillip David Bale *	2,805	11%	
Conservative	John Gustaf Lancaster	2,804	11%	
Conservative	Thomas Alexander Parkhill	2,528	10%	
Labour Co-op	Garry Hunt *	2,523	10%	
Conservative	Daniel Pablo Ruff	2,383	10%	
Labour Co-op	Jacqueline Margarete Jones	2,282	9%	
Labour Co-op	Masudah Ali	2,254	9%	
Plaid Cymru	Lona Roberts	666	3%	
Liberal Democrats	Karl Anthony Mudd	593	3%	
Liberal Democrats	Sarah Elizabeth Bridges	575	2%	
Liberal Democrats	Anabella Rees	543	2%	
Green	Michael David Cope	528	2%	
Liberal Democrats	Robert Miles Godfrey	449	2%	
UKIP	Lawrence Gwynn	323	1%	
UKIP	Crispin Anthony John	240	1%	
UKIP	Vivian Evans	220	1%	
UKIP	John Hill	180	1%	
Turnout			50%	

=== 2019 by-election ===
A by-election took place on 21 November 2019, caused by the resignation of the remaining Labour councillor, Phil Bale. The seat was won by the Conservatives.

2019 Cardiff Council Llanishen By-election
Party	Candidate	Votes	%	±%
Conservative	Sian Elin-Melbourne	1,566	43%	
Labour Co-op	Garry Hunt	1,254	35%	
Liberal Democrats	Will Ogbourne	387	11%	
Plaid Cymru	Chris Haines	209	6%	
Green	Michael David Cope	138	4%	
Independent	Lawrence Douglas Gwynn	59	2%	
Turnout		3613	27%	

* = sitting councillor prior to the election
