= Adamsdown (electoral ward) =

Adamsdown ward
- Electoral ward
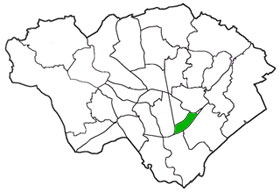
- Location of the Adamsdown ward within Cardiff
- Population: 11,609 (2021 Census)
- Community: Adamsdown
- Principal area: Cardiff
- Country: Wales
- Sovereign state: United Kingdom
- Post town: CARDIFF
- Postcode district: CF24
- Dialling code: +44-29
- UK Parliament: Cardiff East
- Senedd Cymru – Welsh Parliament: Cardiff Central
- Councillors: 2

Adamsdown is an electoral ward in the south of Cardiff, capital city of Wales. It covers the community of Adamsdown. It was originally one of the ten wards created in 1890 for elections to Cardiff County Borough Council. Since 1996 it has been a ward to the current Cardiff Council unitary authority.

== Description ==
The Adamsdown ward is divided from the city centre by the (previously Taff Vale) railway line and Queen Street station. Its longest south eastern border is defined by the mainline railway and its northern border by Newport Road (the A461). To the north are the Plasnewydd and Penylan wards, to the south is Butetown and to the southeast is Splott. The ward encompasses Cardiff Prison and the Cardiff Royal Infirmary.

According to the 2011 UK Census, the population of the ward was 10,371, with 8,548 of voting age. by the time of the 2021 UK Census, the population has grown to 11,609.

== City and County of Cardiff Council ==
The Adamsdown ward elected two councillors to Cardiff Council since 1995. It has been represented by the Labour Party and the Liberal Democrats.

Representation 1995 – date
Election	Labour	Lib Dem
2022	2	-
2017	1	1
2012	1	1
2008	-	2
2004	-	2
1999	-	2
1995	2	-

== Cardiff County Borough Council ==
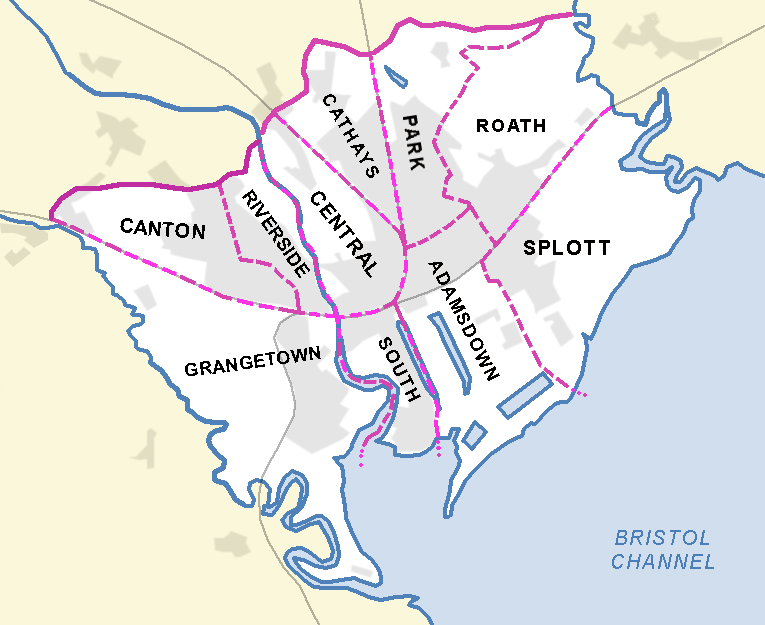
Wards of Cardiff, 1890

In July 1890, following the creation of Cardiff County Borough Council, Adamsdown was one of the ten new electoral wards created in the county borough. The ward stretched south as far as the coast, bordered to the west by the Bute West Dock and the South ward. Each of the three councillors took turns to stand for re-election, on a three-yearly cycle.

In the November 1890 election Edward Thomas successfully defended his seat, for the Liberal Party, with 70% of the vote. He was then dragged by enthusiastic supporters, in a carriage to the nearby Reform Club.
