= West Glamorgan County Council =

Welsh local governing body (1974–1996)

West Glamorgan County Council Cyngor Sir Gorllewin Morgannwg

History
- Founded: 1 April 1974
- Disbanded: 31 March 1996
- Preceded by: Swansea County Borough Council; Glamorgan County Council
- Succeeded by: Swansea; Neath Port Talbot

Elections
- First election: April 1973
- Last election: May 1993
- Next election: N/A

Meeting place
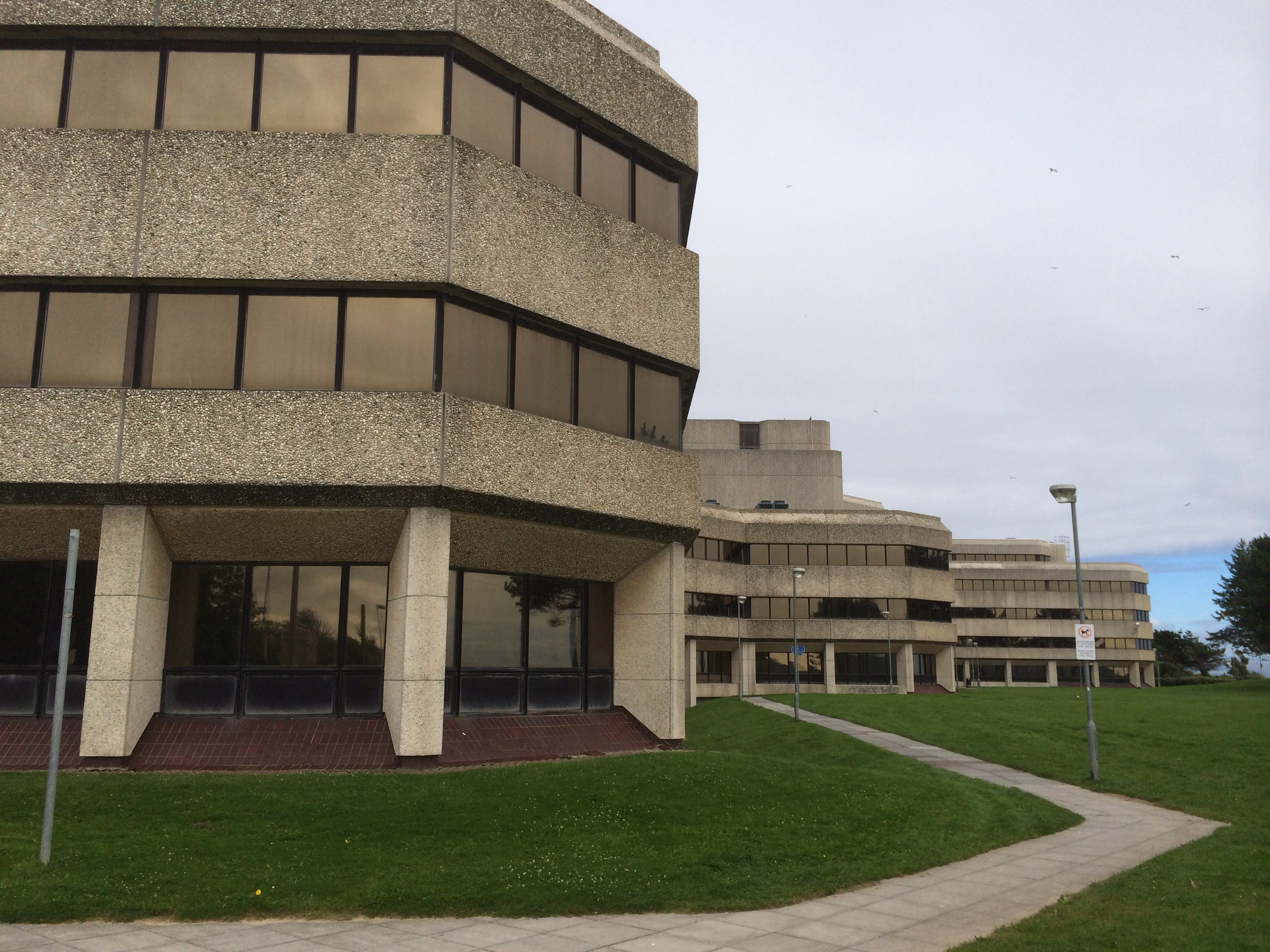
- County Hall, Swansea

West Glamorgan County Council (Welsh: Cyngor Sir Gorllewin Morgannwg) was the county council of the county of West Glamorgan in south-west Wales, from its creation in 1974 to its abolition in 1996.

== History ==
The county was created in 1974 under the Local Government Act 1972, covering the western part of the old administrative county of Glamorgan and the city of Swansea, which had been a county borough, independent from Glamorgan County Council.

West Glamorgan County Council was abolished in 1996 under the Local Government (Wales) Act 1994, with the districts in the area being reorganised to become unitary authorities, taking over the functions previously performed by the county council. Since 1 April 1996 the area has been divided into the two unitary authorities of Swansea and Neath Port Talbot.

== Political control ==
The first election to the county council was held in 1973, initially operating as a shadow authority alongside the outgoing authorities until it came into its powers on 1 April 1974. Labour held a majority of the seats on the council throughout its existence.

Party in control	Years
Labour	1974–1996

=== Leadership ===
The leaders of the council were:

Councillor	Party	From	To
Llewellyn Heycock	Labour	1 Apr 1974	1977
John Allison	Labour	1977	May 1989
Fred Kingdom	Labour	May 1989	May 1993
Tom Jones	Labour	May 1993	31 Mar 1996

== Elections ==
The first South Glamorgan County Council elections took place in April 1973, when 70 councillors were elected. The number of councillors was reduced to 61 in 1989. The results of each election were as follows:

Year	Seats	Labour	Conservative	Liberal Democrats (Note: Includes Liberals and SDP pre-1988)	Plaid Cymru	Others	Notes
1973	70	51	9	2	2	6	
1977	70	41	10	-	3	16	
1981	70	56	10	-	-	4	
1985	70	54	7	5	0	4	
1989	61	44	6	2	1	8	New division boundaries.
1993	61	47	3	3	1	7	

== Premises ==
The county council was initially based at the Guildhall in Swansea but moved to County Hall in Swansea in 1982.
