= 1977 South Glamorgan County Council election =

1977 Welsh local government election

The second election to South Glamorgan County Council was held in May 1977. It was preceded by the 1973 election and followed by the 1981 election.

== Boundary changes ==
There were no boundary changes but the balance of representation in the Penarth wards appears to have changed with the North/Central ward gaining a seat and the West ward losing one.

== Candidates ==
Conservative and Labour candidates contested the vast majority of seats. In contrast with four years previously there were more Liberal candidates together with a smaller number of Plaid Cymru candidates and Independents.

== Outcome ==
When the authority was established the Conservatives had hoped to win control but failed to do so in 1973. However, they won control at this election, with sweeping gains across Cardiff and the Vale, including some seats which the party had not fully contested at the previous election. Defeated candidates included the leader of the council, Jack Leonard.

== Ward results ==
=== Adamsdown (two seats) ===
Adamsdown 1977
Party	Candidate	Votes	%	±%
Labour	D. Evans*	1,011		
Labour	John Iorwerth Jones*	929		
Conservative	B. Jones	763		
Conservative	D. Jones	647		
Turnout				
Labour hold		Swing		
Labour hold		Swing		

=== Barry, Baruc (one seat) ===
Barry, Baruc 1977
Party	Candidate	Votes	%	±%
Conservative	E. Jones	1,651		
Labour	J. Davies*	854		
Turnout				
Conservative gain from Labour		Swing		

=== Barry, Buttrills (one seat) ===
Barry, Buttrills 1977
Party	Candidate	Votes	%	±%
Conservative	E. Evans	691		
Labour	R. Williams*	345		
Turnout				
Conservative gain from Labour		Swing		

=== Barry, Cadoc (one seat) ===
Barry, Cadoc 1977
Party	Candidate	Votes	%	±%
Conservative	J. Whitchurch	1,015		
Labour	C. Price	750		
Turnout				
Conservative gain from Labour		Swing		

=== Barry, Castleland (one seat) ===
Barry, Castleland 1977
Party	Candidate	Votes	%	±%
Conservative	E. Williams	729		
Labour	T. Thompson	609		
Turnout				
Conservative gain from Labour		Swing		

=== Barry, Court (two seats) ===
Barry, Court 1977
Party	Candidate	Votes	%	±%
Conservative	M. Davies	1,211		
Conservative	M. Walnycki	998		
Labour	M. Webber*	907		
Labour	T. Cornwall	901		
Turnout				
Conservative gain from Labour		Swing		
Conservative gain from Labour		Swing		

=== Barry, Dyfan (two seats) ===
Barry, Dyfan 1977
Party	Candidate	Votes	%	±%
Labour	D. Hinds*			
Labour	C. Watkins			
Conservative	Ronnie Boon			
Conservative	W. Woodham			
Turnout				
Labour hold		Swing		
Labour hold		Swing		

=== Barry, Illtyd (one seat) ===
Councillor Tresize had sat for the Cadoc Ward at the previous election.

Barry, Illtyd 1977
Party	Candidate	Votes	%	±%
Conservative	G. Mackillican*	1,427		
Labour	H. Tresize*	904		
Turnout				
Conservative hold		Swing		

=== Canton (two seats) ===
Canton 1977
Party	Candidate	Votes	%	±%
Conservative	Bella Brown*	1,756		
Conservative	Trevor Tyrrell*	1,540		
Labour	P. Thomas	813		
Labour	A. Davis	647		
Plaid Cymru	R. Lee	365		
Turnout				
Conservative hold		Swing		
Conservative hold		Swing		

=== Cardiff Rural No.1 (one seat) ===
Cardiff Rural No.1 1977
Party	Candidate	Votes	%	±%
Plaid Cymru	C. Chedzey			
Conservative	W. Clarke			
Turnout				
Plaid Cymru gain from Conservative		Swing		

=== Cardiff Rural No.3, Dinas Powys (two seats) ===
Cardiff Rural No.3, Dinas Powys 1977
Party	Candidate	Votes	%	±%
Conservative	B. Jones*	2,197		
Conservative	M. Box	2,019		
Plaid Cymru	John Dixon	1,413		
Plaid Cymru	Chris Franks	1,012		
Liberal	J. Baker	391		
Turnout				
Conservative hold		Swing		
Conservative hold		Swing		

=== Cardiff Rural No.4, Wenvoe (one seat) ===
Cardiff Rural No.4, Wenvoe 1977
Party	Candidate	Votes	%	±%
Conservative	C. Rush*	Unopposed		
Conservative hold		Swing		

=== Cardiff Rural No.5, Rhoose (one seat) ===
Cardiff Rural No.5, Rhoose 1977
Party	Candidate	Votes	%	±%
Conservative	A. Lewis	1,087		
Independent	J. Howell*	602		
Turnout				
Conservative gain from Independent		Swing		

=== Cardiff South (two seats) ===
Cardiff South 1977
Party	Candidate	Votes	%	±%
Labour	Philip Dunleavy*	1,360		
Labour	J. Smith*	1,289		
Conservative	E. Williams	1,024		
Conservative	E. Canning	960		
Ratepayers	E. Shelley	960		
Plaid Cymru	E. Roberts	317		
Communist	J. Richards	192		
Turnout				
Labour hold		Swing		
Labour hold		Swing		

=== Cathays (three seats) ===
Cathays 1977
Party	Candidate	Votes	%	±%
Conservative	E. Chichister	2,109		
Conservative	J. Jones	2,100		
Conservative	S. Taylor	1,971		
Labour	Emyr Currie-Jones*	1,618		
Labour	John Charles Edwards*	1,560		
Labour	D. Dixon	1,382		
Ratepayers	R. Castle	548		
Plaid Cymru	T. O'Neill	430		
Liberal	G. Snell	412		
Plaid Cymru	R. Wilson	367		
Liberal	D. Giles	350		
Liberal	D. Rees	320		
Plaid Cymru	B. Smith	305		
Turnout				
Conservative gain from Labour		Swing		
Conservative gain from Labour		Swing		
Conservative gain from Labour		Swing		

=== Central (two seats) ===
Central 1977
Party	Candidate	Votes	%	±%
Conservative	D. Marles	1,043		
Conservative	C. Thomas	989		
Labour	Gordon William Fish*	937		
Labour	William Herbert*	863		
Plaid Cymru	R. Griffiths	273		
Plaid Cymru	P. Riley	266		
Liberal	P. Davies	125		
Liberal	J. Blaine	120		
Turnout				
Conservative gain from Labour		Swing		
Conservative gain from Labour		Swing		

=== Cowbridge No.1 (one seat) ===
Cowbridge No.1 1977
Party	Candidate	Votes	%	±%
Conservative	R. Thomas	2,018		
Liberal	R. Carden	673		
Turnout				
Conservative hold		Swing		

=== Cowbridge No.2 (two seats) ===
Cowbridge No.2 1977
Party	Candidate	Votes	%	±%
Conservative	J. Barrat	1,822		
Independent	J. George*	1,718		
Conservative	N. Barker	1,546		
Labour	D. Percy*	1,019		
Labour	J. Jordon	688		
Independent	G. Rees	575		
Turnout				
Conservative gain from Labour		Swing		
Independent hold		Swing		

=== Ely (four seats) ===
Ely 1977
Party	Candidate	Votes	%	±%
Labour	William Carling*	2,660		
Labour	Robert Morgan*	2,492		
Labour	Albert Buttle*	2,470		
Labour	H. Gough	2,401		
Conservative	W. Clode	1,987		
Conservative	S. Jose	1,773		
Conservative	R. Symes	1,726		
Conservative	J. Bushrod	1,702		
Turnout				
Labour hold		Swing		
Labour hold		Swing		
Labour hold		Swing		
Labour hold		Swing		

=== Gabalfa (three seats) ===
Gabalfa 1977
Party	Candidate	Votes	%	±%
Conservative	M. Merridew	2,002		
Labour	Michael Parry*	1,982		
Conservative	C. Saunders	1,850		
Labour	Emrys Pride*	1,826		
Conservative	G. Tatham	1,708		
Labour	M. Mathewson	1,522		
Ratepayers	V. Kempton	668		
Plaid Cymru	L. Hayden	354		
Plaid Cymru	B. Wilson	351		
Turnout				
Conservative gain from Labour		Swing		
Labour hold		Swing		
Conservative gain from Labour		Swing		

=== Grangetown (two seats) ===
Grangetown 1977
Party	Candidate	Votes	%	±%
Conservative	A. Mountstephen	1,538		
Conservative	L. Quinn	1,334		
Labour	D. Lydiard	1,313		
Labour	B. Matthewson*	1,197		
Plaid Cymru	S. Crouch	325		
Turnout				
Conservative gain from Labour		Swing		
Conservative gain from Labour		Swing		

=== Lisvane, Llanedeyrn and St Mellons (one seat) ===
Lisvane, Llanedeyrn and St Mellons 1977
Party	Candidate	Votes	%	±%
Conservative	J. Lysaght*			
Plaid Cymru	M. Nightingale			
Turnout				
Conservative hold		Swing		

=== Llandaff (three seats) ===
Llandaff 1977
Party	Candidate	Votes	%	±%
Conservative	M. Jones*	2,937		
Conservative	Julius Hermer*	2,889		
Conservative	H. Ferguson-Jones*	2,801		
Plaid Cymru	G. Petty	937		
Labour	G. Rhoden	774		
Labour	H. Rhoden	758		
Turnout				
Conservative hold		Swing		
Conservative hold		Swing		
Conservative hold		Swing		

=== Llanishen (four seats) ===
Llanishen 1977
Party	Candidate	Votes	%	±%
Conservative	T. Cronin*	4,382		
Conservative	B. Rees	4,368		
Conservative	G. Tathem	4,357		
Conservative	G. Scott-Dickens	4,314		
Labour	V. Davies	1,194		
Labour	B. Williams	1,145		
Labour	E. Williams	1,024		
Liberal	J. Thomas	894		
Plaid Cymru	R. Edwards	559		
Plaid Cymru	J. May	536		
Plaid Cymru	S. Doyle	527		
Turnout				
Conservative hold		Swing		
Conservative hold		Swing		
Conservative hold		Swing		
Conservative hold		Swing		

=== Penarth North/Central (one seat) ===
Penarth North/Central 1977
Party	Candidate	Votes	%	±%
Conservative	M. Kelly-Owen	919		
Labour	D. Foulkes*	660		
Plaid Cymru	R. Davies	600		
Turnout				
Conservative win (new seat)				

=== Penarth South Ward (two seats) ===
Penarth South Ward 1977
Party	Candidate	Votes	%	±%
Conservative	A. Sanders	2,086		
Conservative	W. Goddard	2,072		
Labour	H. Rees	420		
Labour	P. Gray	419		
Liberal	S. Baker	279		
Turnout				
Labour hold		Swing		
Conservative gain from Labour		Swing		

=== Penarth West (one seat) ===
Penarth West 1977
Party	Candidate	Votes	%	±%
Conservative	E. Lloyd	2,193		
Conservative	S. Thomas	2,175		
Labour	D. Foulkes	1,432		
Labour	A. Rees	1,251		
Plaid Cymru	R. Davies	600		
Turnout				
Conservative win (new seat)				
Conservative win (new seat)				

=== Penylan (five seats) ===
Penylan 1977
Party	Candidate	Votes	%	±%
Conservative	Stefan Terlezki*	7,308		
Conservative	C. Peterson	7,237		
Conservative	Peter Meyer	7,167		
Conservative	M. Hallinan	6,917		
Conservative	A. Thomas	6,791		
Labour	M. Jones	1,702		
Labour	C. O'Brien	1,667		
Labour	S. Simpson	1,579		
Labour	L. Green	1,577		
Labour	P. Wing	1,559		
Ratepayers	A. Dickson	1,441		
Liberal	D. Thomas	1,184		
Liberal	P. Linsey	868		
Plaid Cymru	A. Couch	838		
Plaid Cymru	A. Morgan	831		
Liberal	D. Hill	812		
Plaid Cymru	P. Cravos	798		
Plaid Cymru	Alun Ogwen	767		
Liberal	C. Mitchell	742		
Plaid Cymru	H. Phillips	724		
Turnout				
Conservative hold		Swing		
Conservative hold		Swing		
Conservative hold		Swing		
Conservative hold		Swing		
Conservative hold		Swing	99	

=== Plas Mawr (four seats) ===
Plas Mawr 1977
Party	Candidate	Votes	%	±%
Labour	Frederick Tyrrell*			
Conservative	R. Wheeler			
Conservative	B. Hall			
Plaid Cymru	D. Davies			
Conservative	J. Phillips			
Labour	Hubert Harding*			
Conservative	W. Jones			
Labour	John Leonard*			
Labour	Albert Huish*			
Turnout				
Labour hold		Swing		
Conservative gain from Labour		Swing		
Conservative gain from Labour		Swing		
Plaid Cymru gain from Labour		Swing		

=== Plasnewydd (two seats) ===
Plasnewydd 1977
Party	Candidate	Votes	%	±%
Conservative	Olwen Watkin*	2,031		
Conservative	S. James*	1,799		
Labour	T. Richards	872		
Labour	R. Harrod	866		
Plaid Cymru	G. Evans	480		
Plaid Cymru	J. Cadwaladr	419		
Liberal	K. James	246		
Ratepayers	C. Braygrove	207		
Liberal	P. Jarma	182		
Communist	R. Spencer	91		
Turnout				
Conservative hold		Swing		
Conservative hold		Swing		

=== Rhiwbina (three seats) ===
Rhiwbina 1977
Party	Candidate	Votes	%	±%
Conservative	M. Davies*	3,738		
Conservative	W. Bain*	3,696		
Conservative	Gareth Neale*	3,620		
Ratepayers	E. Penfold	1,018		
Labour	C. Beach	691		
Labour	R. Woolfe	640		
Labour	W. Walker	573		
Plaid Cymru	E. Davies	549		
Plaid Cymru	W. Hughes	513		
Plaid Cymru	R. Williams	459		
Liberal	G. White	430		
Turnout				
Conservative hold		Swing		
Conservative hold		Swing		
Conservative hold		Swing		

=== Riverside (two seats) ===
Riverside 1977
Party	Candidate	Votes	%	±%
Conservative	F. McAndrews	1,554		
Conservative	R. Souza	1,548		
Labour	G. Odgers	1,100		
Labour	D. Toogood	1,054		
Turnout				
Conservative hold		Swing		
Conservative hold		Swing		

=== Roath (three seats) ===
Roath 1977
Party	Candidate	Votes	%	±%
Conservative	I. Hermer*	2,936		
Conservative	F. McCarthy*	2,889		
Conservative	R. Richards*	2,831		
Labour	T. Tucker	932		
Liberal	R. Thomas	757		
Plaid Cymru	G. Bowman	641		
Turnout				
Conservative hold		Swing		
Conservative hold		Swing		
Conservative hold		Swing		

=== Rumney (five seats) ===
Rumney 1977
Party	Candidate	Votes	%	±%
Labour	M. Llewellyn	3,275		
Labour	J. Jones	3,016		
Conservative	C. Nicholson	2,965		
Conservative	S. Woods	2,933		
Conservative	N. Smith	2,930		
Labour	M. Mullins	2,844		
Labour	D. Evans*	2,822		
Conservative	T. Fitzgerald	2,805		
Labour	David Seligman*	2,648		
Conservative	J. Wright	2,573		
Ratepayers	J. Walker	1,154		
Turnout				
Labour hold		Swing		
Labour hold		Swing		
Conservative gain from Labour		Swing		
Conservative gain from Labour		Swing		
Conservative gain from Labour		Swing		

=== Splott (three seats) ===
Splott 1977
Party	Candidate	Votes	%	±%
Labour	Manuel Delgado*	1,457		
Labour	Gordon Houlston	1,353		
Labour	John Brooks*	1,349		
Conservative	F. Chichister	1,252		
Conservative	A. Kelly	1,247		
Conservative	K. Wilcox	1,127		
Ratepayers	R. Warburton	520		
Turnout				
Labour hold		Swing		
Labour hold		Swing		
Labour hold		Swing		

=== Whitchurch (three seats) ===
Whitchurch 1977
Party	Candidate	Votes	%	±%
Conservative	David Purnell*	3,779		
Conservative	R. Evans*	3,718		
Conservative	W. Richards	3,588		
Labour	H. Davies	1,035		
Labour	H. Bartlett	1,016		
Labour	W. Davies	1,005		
Ratepayers	P. Dyer	911		
Plaid Cymru	H. Davies	554		
Liberal	S. Davies	509		
Liberal	S. Soffa	333		
Turnout				
Conservative hold		Swing		
Conservative hold		Swing		
Conservative gain from Labour		Swing		

KEY

- indicates sitting councillor for the ward

+ indicates sitting councillor but for different ward
