= 1973 South Glamorgan County Council election =

1973 Welsh local government election

The 1973 South Glamorgan County Council election was the first election to South Glamorgan County Council and was held in April 1973. It was followed by the 1977 election.

== Candidates ==
Conservative and Labour candidates contested the vast majority of seats. In contrast there were relatively few Liberal and Plaid Cymru candidates. In Cardiff, many members of the previous County Borough Council sought election to both the new South Glamorgan authority and the new Cardiff City Council (where the elections were held a few weeks later).

== Outcome ==
Glamorgan was the only county to be divided as a result of local government re-organization in England and Wales from 1 April 1974. Previous proposals proposed by the Labour Party had envisaged a division into two new counties, East and West. However, the Conservatives favoured the creation of South Glamorgan given that they entertained hopes of winning control.

The first elections were in May 1973 and councillors would act in a shadow capacity for the next 11 months, setting up the various functions, until the new council came into effect. Labour won a small majority (though subsequently allocated themselves 15 of the 20 seats on the steering committee), largely as a result of winning most of the seats in Cardiff and also in the port of Barry.

== Results ==
This section summarises the detailed results which are noted in the following sections. This was the inaugural county election and therefore no comparison can be made with the previous elections.

This table summarises the result of the elections in all wards. 80 councillors were elected.

1973 South Glamorgan County Council: elected members
Party	Seats	Gains	Losses	Net gain/loss	Seats %	Votes %	Votes	+/−
Labour	42			N/A				
Conservative	36			N/A				
Liberal	0			N/A				
Plaid Cymru	0			N/A				
Independent	2			N/A				

== Ward results ==
=== Adamsdown (two seats) ===
Adamsdown 1973
Party	Candidate	Votes	%	±%
Labour	D. Evans	1,295		
Labour	John Iorwerth Jones	1,262		
Conservative	E.C. Canning	387		
Liberal	H. Edwards	304		
Independent	Thelma Mackie	66		
Turnout				
Labour win (new seat)				
Labour win (new seat)				

=== Barry, Baruc (one seat) ===
Barry, Baruc 1973
Party	Candidate	Votes	%	±%
Labour	J. Davies	1,298		
Conservative	T. Holmes	1,058		
Turnout				
Labour win (new seat)				

=== Barry, Buttrills (one seat) ===
Barry, Buttrills 1973
Party	Candidate	Votes	%	±%
Labour	R. Williams	1,021		
Conservative	A. Barbrouk	576		
Turnout				
Labour win (new seat)				

=== Barry, Cadoc (one seat) ===
Barry, Cadoc 1973
Party	Candidate	Votes	%	±%
Labour	J. Tresize	895		
Conservative	R. Potter	549		
Turnout				
Labour win (new seat)				

=== Barry, Castleland (one seat) ===
Barry, Castleland 1973
Party	Candidate	Votes	%	±%
Labour	H. Clease	939		
Conservative	R. Hinsley	550		
Turnout				
Labour win (new seat)				

=== Barry, Court (two seats) ===
Barry, Court 1973
Party	Candidate	Votes	%	±%
Labour	C. Dunkley	1,370		
Labour	M. Webber	1,328		
Conservative	H. Charles	590		
Turnout				
Labour win (new seat)				
Labour win (new seat)				

=== Barry, Dyfan (two seats) ===
Barry, Dyfan 1973
Party	Candidate	Votes	%	±%
Labour	D. Hinds	1,323		
Labour	T. Lewis	1,183		
Liberal	I. Morgan	1,018		
Conservative	H. Pascoe	868		
Turnout				
Labour win (new seat)				
Labour win (new seat)				

=== Barry, Illtyd (one seat) ===
Barry, Castleland 1973
Party	Candidate	Votes	%	±%
Conservative	George Mackillican	1,023		
Labour	Maureen Elsworth	1,022		
Turnout				
Conservative win (new seat)				

Councillor Mackillican won by one vote after four recounts. This was the smallest majority in the country at these elections. Mrs Elsworth had won the Illtyd ward for the Vale of Glamorgan Borough Council in 1972 by only four votes.

=== Canton (two seats) ===
Canton 1973
Party	Candidate	Votes	%	±%
Conservative	Bella Brown	1,459		
Conservative	Trevor Tyrrell	1,273		
Labour	George E. Bayliss	1,258		
Labour	Dengar Robinson Evans	1,225		
Turnout				
Conservative win (new seat)				
Conservative win (new seat)				

=== Cardiff Rural No.1 (one seat) ===
Cardiff Rural No.1 1973
Party	Candidate	Votes	%	±%
Conservative	V. Jones	1,081		
Labour	G. Bailey	805		
Turnout				
Conservative win (new seat)				

=== Cardiff Rural No.3 (two seats) ===
Cardiff Rural No.3 1973
Party	Candidate	Votes	%	±%
Conservative	B. Jones	1,955		
Conservative	E. Jenkins	1,912		
Labour	D. Roberts	1,087		
Labour	W. Smith	922		
Turnout				
Conservative win (new seat)				
Conservative win (new seat)				

=== Cardiff Rural No.4, Wenvoe (one seat) ===
Cardiff Rural No.4, Wenvoe 1973
Party	Candidate	Votes	%	±%
Conservative	C. Rush	Unopposed		
Conservative win (new seat)				

=== Cardiff Rural No.5, Rhoose (one seat) ===
Cardiff Rural No.5, Rhoose 1973
Party	Candidate	Votes	%	±%
Independent	J. Howell	795		
Conservative	H. James	621		
Turnout				
Independent win (new seat)				

=== Cardiff South (two seats) ===
Cardiff South 1973
Party	Candidate	Votes	%	±%
Labour	Philip Dunleavy	1,600		
Labour	F. Smith	1,554		
Conservative	T. Roche	994		
Conservative	F. Arnold	829		
Turnout				
Labour win (new seat)				
Labour win (new seat)				

=== Cathays (three seats) ===
Cathays 1973
Party	Candidate	Votes	%	±%
Labour	Derek Allinson	2,347		
Labour	John Charles Edwards	2,289		
Labour	Emyr Currie-Jones	2,266		
Conservative	I. Jones	1,410		
Conservative	G. Miles	1,229		
Conservative	M. Rivlin	1,169		
Plaid Cymru	A. Littlejohns	732		
Turnout				
Labour win (new seat)				
Labour win (new seat)				
Labour win (new seat)				

=== Central (two seats) ===
Central 1973
Party	Candidate	Votes	%	±%
Labour	Gordon William Fish	1,389		
Labour	William Herbert	1,343		
Conservative	L. Walters	840		
Turnout				
Labour win (new seat)				
Labour win (new seat)				

=== Cowbridge No.1 (one seat) ===
Cowbridge No.1 1973
Party	Candidate	Votes	%	±%
Conservative	R. Thomas	Unopposed		
Conservative win (new seat)				

=== Cowbridge No.2 (two seats) ===
Cowbridge No.2 1973
Party	Candidate	Votes	%	±%
Independent	J. George	1,723		
Labour	D. Percy	1,023		
Independent	K. Berry	946		
Conservative	P. Jones	850		
Labour	J. Barnett	504		
Conservative	W. Cain	496		
Turnout				
Independent win (new seat)				
Labour win (new seat)				

=== Ely (four seats) ===
Ely 1973
Party	Candidate	Votes	%	±%
Labour	Albert W. Buttle	2,696		
Labour	William Carling	2,662		
Labour	Robert Morgan	2,627		
Labour	Thomas Clifford Lee	2,487		
Conservative	W. Clode	1,013		
Conservative	A. Fitzpatrick	940		
Conservative	J. Phillips	931		
Conservative	Joan Joshua	888		
Plaid Cymru	E. Maynard	570		
Plaid Cymru	J. Storm	504		
Turnout				
Labour win (new seat)				
Labour win (new seat)				
Labour win (new seat)				
Labour win (new seat)				

=== Gabalfa (three seats) ===
Gabalfa 1973
Party	Candidate	Votes	%	±%
Labour	Michael Parry	2,357		
Labour	Emrys Pride	2,351		
Labour	Arthur Brown	2,315		
Conservative	D. Hulston	1,083		
Plaid Cymru	B. Davies	509		
Turnout				
Labour win (new seat)				
Labour win (new seat)				
Labour win (new seat)				

=== Grangetown (two seats) ===
Grangetown 1973
Party	Candidate	Votes	%	±%
Labour	Harold Bartlett	1,423		
Labour	B. Matthewson	1,401		
Conservative	G. Judd	968		
Independent	R. Aldridge	454		
Turnout				
Labour win (new seat)				
Labour win (new seat)				

=== Lisvane, Llanedeyrn and St Mellons (one seat) ===
Lisvane, Llanedeyrn and St Mellons 1973
Party	Candidate	Votes	%	±%
Conservative	J. Lysaght	Unopposed		
Conservative win (new seat)				

=== Llandaff (three seats) ===
Llandaff 1973
Party	Candidate	Votes	%	±%
Conservative	H. Ferguson-Jones	2,322		
Conservative	M. Jones	2,217		
Conservative	Julius Hermer	2,158		
Plaid Cymru	A. Petty	897		
Labour	N. Maylin	837		
Labour	A. Saunders	832		
Labour	I. Berridge	668		
Turnout				
Conservative win (new seat)				
Conservative win (new seat)				
Conservative win (new seat)				

=== Llanishen (four seats) ===
Llanishen 1973
Party	Candidate	Votes	%	±%
Conservative	Jeffrey Sainsbury	3,059		
Conservative	Lionel Pugh	2,960		
Conservative	Ronald Watkiss	2,935		
Conservative	T. Cronin	2,912		
Labour	M. Beasley	2,093		
Labour	H. Davies	2,083		
Labour	M. Powell-Davies	1,950		
Liberal	O. Langdon	1,813		
Labour	E. Singer	1,790		
Plaid Cymru	R. Edwards	844		
Turnout				
Conservative win (new seat)				
Conservative win (new seat)				
Conservative win (new seat)				
Conservative win (new seat)				

=== Penarth North/Central (two seats) ===
Penarth North/Central 1973
Party	Candidate	Votes	%	±%
Conservative	C. Jones	1,634		
Conservative	A. Sanders	1,605		
Labour	E. Symonds	686		
Labour	D. Eves	676		
Turnout				
Conservative win (new seat)				
Conservative win (new seat)				

=== Penarth South Ward (two seats) ===
Penarth South Ward 1973
Party	Candidate	Votes	%	±%
Labour	D. Foulkes	1,887		
Conservative	E. Lloyd	1,753		
Labour	T. Mules	1,676		
Conservative	T. Murphy	1,643		
Turnout				
Labour win (new seat)				
Conservative win (new seat)				

=== Penarth West (one seat) ===
Penarth West 1973
Party	Candidate	Votes	%	±%
Labour	G. Cox	883		
Conservative	E. Parsons	713		
Turnout				
Labour win (new seat)				

=== Penylan (five seats) ===
Penylan 1973
Party	Candidate	Votes	%	±%
Conservative	Stefan Terlezki	4,688		
Conservative	G. Turnbull	4,238		
Conservative	C. Peterson	4,153		
Conservative	Peter Meyer	4,108		
Conservative	Mary Hallinan	3,801		
Liberal	J. Davies	3,269		
Liberal	B. Williams	3,146		
Liberal	David Rees	3,011		
Labour	Y. Roblin	2,885		
Liberal	A. Myranthis	2,654		
Labour	C. O'Brien	2,629		
Labour	V. Jones	2,391		
Labour	R. Maggs	2,034		
Turnout				
Conservative win (new seat)				
Conservative win (new seat)				
Conservative win (new seat)				
Conservative win (new seat)				
Conservative win (new seat)				

=== Plas Mawr (four seats) ===
Plas Mawr 1973
Party	Candidate	Votes	%	±%
Labour	Hubert Harding	2,701		
Labour	Frederick Tyrrell	2,521		
Labour	Albert Huish	2,339		
Labour	John Leonard	2,191		
Plaid Cymru	Dafydd Hughes	1,513		
Conservative	W. Hall	1,177		
Conservative	F. Jones	1,156		
Conservative	D. Norman	1,143		
Conservative	P. Baynham	933		
Turnout				
Labour win (new seat)				
Labour win (new seat)				
Labour win (new seat)				
Labour win (new seat)				

=== Plasnewydd (two seats) ===
Plasnewydd 1973
Party	Candidate	Votes	%	±%
Conservative	Olwen Watkin	1,856		
Conservative	S. James	1,615		
Labour	P. Troy	1,314		
Labour	A. Mills	1,251		
Plaid Cymru	Phil Richards	831		
Turnout				
Conservative win (new seat)				
Conservative win (new seat)				

=== Rhiwbina (three seats) ===
Rhiwbina 1973
Party	Candidate	Votes	%	±%
Conservative	W. Bain	2,541		
Conservative	M. Davies	2,450		
Conservative	Gareth Neale	2,357		
Liberal	G. Davies	1,862		
Liberal	H. O'Brien	1,755		
Plaid Cymru	H. Davies	1,737		
Liberal	S. Cotsen	1,668		
Labour	M. Mullins	985		
Labour	B. Morris	973		
Labour	D. Rees	885		
Turnout				
Conservative win (new seat)				
Conservative win (new seat)				
Conservative win (new seat)				

=== Riverside (two seats) ===
Riverside 1973
Party	Candidate	Votes	%	±%
Conservative	J. Donovan	1,309		
Conservative	G. Jones	1,133		
Labour	F. Beatson	1,007		
Labour	D. Toogood	978		
Plaid Cymru	R. Lee	410		
Turnout				
Conservative win (new seat)				
Conservative win (new seat)				

=== Roath (three seats) ===
Roath 1973
Party	Candidate	Votes	%	±%
Conservative	F. McCarthy	2,416		
Conservative	A. Richards	2,351		
Conservative	I. Hermer	2,346		
Labour	T. O'Callaghen	1,193		
Turnout				
Conservative win (new seat)				
Conservative win (new seat)				
Conservative win (new seat)				

=== Rumney (five seats) ===
Rumney 1973
Party	Candidate	Votes	%	±%
Labour	D. Evans	3,585		
Labour	J. Rees	3,504		
Labour	L. Goodrum	3,474		
Labour	W. Kitson	3,363		
Labour	David Seligman	3,012		
Independent	T. Laurie	2,055		
Independent Ratepayer	D. Sandford-Hill	1,520		
Turnout				
Labour win (new seat)				
Labour win (new seat)				
Labour win (new seat)				
Labour win (new seat)				
Labour win (new seat)				

=== Splott (five seats) ===
Splott 1973
Party	Candidate	Votes	%	±%
Labour	Manuel Delgado	2,145		
Labour	John Brooks	1,900		
Labour	R. Harry	1,852		
Conservative	D. O'Connell	861		
Communist	S. Garrett-Jones	166		
Turnout				
Labour win (new seat)				
Labour win (new seat)				
Labour win (new seat)				
Labour win (new seat)				
Labour win (new seat)				

=== Whitchurch (three seats) ===
Whitchurch 1973
Party	Candidate	Votes	%	±%
Conservative	R. Evans	3,142		
Labour	Philip Norton	3,066		
Conservative	A. Purnell	2,941		
Conservative	Victor Riley	2,858		
Labour	A. Donne	2,576		
Labour	D. Weeks	2,405		
Turnout				
Conservative win (new seat)				
Labour win (new seat)				
Conservative win (new seat)				

KEY

o indicates sitting councillor on Cardiff City Council prior to 1973 election

A indicates sitting alderman on Cardiff City Council prior to 1973 election
