= 1985 South Glamorgan County Council election =

Local election in Wales

The fourth election to South Glamorgan County Council for South Glamorgan, Wales, was held in May 1985. It was preceded by the 1981 election and followed by the 1989 election.

== Boundary changes ==
There were wholesale boundary changes at this election. The previous multi-member wards were abolished and replaced with 62 new single-member wards. A small number of the wards remained unchanged.

== Candidates ==
Conservative and Labour candidates contested all seats, as did the Liberal candidates, now in the Alliance with the SDP. There were a smaller number of Plaid Cymru and Green Party candidates and a few Independents.

Following boundary changes, two sitting members opposed each other in the Cornerswell, Landsdowne and Llandaff North wards.

== Outcome ==
Having regained control of the authority in 1981, Labour retained control by a comfortable majority. The Liberals and SDP also made some advances in Cardiff. This table summarises the result of the elections in all wards. 62 councillors were elected.

Some of the seats where Alliance candidates were successful had the highest turnouts in the county. Among other seats, one of the highest turnouts (59.6%) was in the Rhoose with Llancarfan ward where the sitting councillor, elected as a Conservative in 1981, stood as an Independent but finished bottom of the poll.

1985 South Glamorgan County Council: elected members
| Party | Seats | Gains | Losses | Net gain/loss | Seats % | Votes % | Votes | +/− |
|---|---|---|---|---|---|---|---|---|
| Labour | 34 | | | | | | | |
| Conservative | 18 | | | | | | | |
| Liberal | 6 | | | | | | | |
| SDP | 3 | | | | | | | |
| Plaid Cymru | 1 | | | | | | | |

== Ward Results ==
=== Adamsdown ===
Adamsdown 1985
| Party | Candidate | Votes | % | ±% |
|---|---|---|---|---|
| Labour | Kenneth Hutchings^{o} | 1,085 | 59.7 | |
| Conservative | W. Hutton | 346 | 19.0 | |
| Alliance (SDP) | P. Callahan | 304 | 16.7 | |
| Plaid Cymru | J. Chamber | 82 | 4.5 | |
| Majority | | | | |
| Turnout | | | 34.3 | |
| Labour win (new seat) | | | | |

=== Baruc ===
Baruc 1985
| Party | Candidate | Votes | % | ±% |
|---|---|---|---|---|
| Conservative | E. Jones* | 999 | 49.2 | |
| Labour | D. Evans | 564 | 27.8 | |
| Alliance (Liberal) | W. Baritt | 468 | 23.0 | |
| Majority | | | | |
| Turnout | | | 46.7 | |
| Conservative hold | | Swing | | |

=== Butetown ===
Butetown 1985
| Party | Candidate | Votes | % | ±% |
|---|---|---|---|---|
| Labour | W. Kitson^{o} | 765 | 81.0 | |
| Conservative | E. Williams | 179 | 19.0 | |
| Majority | | | | |
| Turnout | | | 42.9 | |
| Labour win (new seat) | | | | |

=== Buttrills ===
Buttrills 1985
| Party | Candidate | Votes | % | ±% |
|---|---|---|---|---|
| Labour | B. Lane* | 1,002 | 52.5 | |
| Conservative | J. Connell | 527 | 27.6 | |
| Alliance (SDP) | D. Bond | 380 | 19.9 | |
| Majority | | | | |
| Turnout | | | 45.7 | |
| Labour hold | | Swing | | |

=== Cadoc ===
Cadoc 1985
| Party | Candidate | Votes | % | ±% |
|---|---|---|---|---|
| Labour | F. James | 1,277 | 61.6 | |
| Conservative | D. Whitchurch | 797 | 38.4 | |
| Majority | | | | |
| Turnout | | | 37.3 | |
| Labour hold | | Swing | | |

=== Canton ===
Canton 1985
| Party | Candidate | Votes | % | ±% |
|---|---|---|---|---|
| Labour | Russell Goodway | 951 | 43.4 | |
| Conservative | Trevor C. Tyrrell | 898 | 41.0 | |
| Alliance (SDP) | A. Scadden | 340 | 15.5 | |
| Majority | | 53 | | |
| Turnout | | | 64.3 | |
| Labour win (new seat) | | | | |

=== Castleland ===
Castleland 1985
| Party | Candidate | Votes | % | ±% |
|---|---|---|---|---|
| Labour | M. Sharp* | 969 | 76.9 | |
| Conservative | D. Whitehouse | 291 | 23.1 | |
| Majority | | | | |
| Turnout | | | 42.9 | |
| Labour hold | | Swing | | |

=== Central ===
Central 1985
| Party | Candidate | Votes | % | ±% |
|---|---|---|---|---|
| Alliance (Liberal) | Fred Hornblow | 696 | 43.4 | |
| Labour | H. Rhoden^{o} | 616 | 38.5 | |
| Conservative | W. Palmer | 290 | 18.1 | |
| Majority | | | | |
| Turnout | | | 38.0 | |
| Alliance win (new seat) | | | | |

=== Cornerswell ===
Cornerswell 1985
| Party | Candidate | Votes | % | ±% |
|---|---|---|---|---|
| Labour | E. Tincknell^{o} | 1,013 | 34.1 | |
| Conservative | S. Thomas^{o} | 974 | 32.8 | |
| Alliance (Liberal) | A. Redford | 557 | 18.8 | |
| Plaid Cymru | R. Thomas | 423 | 14.3 | |
| Majority | | | | |
| Turnout | | | 50.2 | |
| Labour win (new seat) | | | | |

=== Court ===
Court 1985
| Party | Candidate | Votes | % | ±% |
|---|---|---|---|---|
| Labour | Mick Antoniw^{o} | 1,179 | 65.2 | |
| Conservative | T. Bowen | 357 | 19.7 | |
| Alliance (SDP) | M. Bond | 227 | 12.5 | |
| Plaid Cymru | R. Thomas | 46 | 2.5 | |
| Majority | | | | |
| Turnout | | | 47.0 | |
| Labour win (new seat) | | | | |

=== Cowbridge ===
Cowbridge 1985
| Party | Candidate | Votes | % | ±% |
|---|---|---|---|---|
| Conservative | R. Thomas* | 1,503 | 53.1 | |
| Labour | J. Jones | 796 | 28.1 | |
| Alliance (SDP) | C. Baker | 533 | 18.8 | |
| Majority | | | | |
| Turnout | | | 49.0 | |
| Conservative hold | | Swing | | |

=== Cyncoed Village ===
Cyncoed Village 1985
| Party | Candidate | Votes | % | ±% |
|---|---|---|---|---|
| Alliance (Liberal) | D. Hill | 1,524 | 57.1 | |
| Conservative | C. Peterson^{o} | 1,020 | 38.1 | |
| Labour | D. Popper | 124 | 4.6 | |
| Majority | | | | |
| Turnout | | | 62.0 | |
| Alliance win (new seat) | | | | |

=== Cyntwell ===
Cyntwell 1985
| Party | Candidate | Votes | % | ±% |
|---|---|---|---|---|
| Labour | B. Phillips* | 859 | 68.1 | |
| Conservative | F. McAndrews | 227 | 18.0 | |
| Alliance (SDP) | J. Hillard | 175 | 13.9 | |
| Majority | | | | |
| Turnout | | | 34.3 | |
| Labour win (new seat) | | | | |

=== Deri ===
Deri 1985
| Party | Candidate | Votes | % | ±% |
|---|---|---|---|---|
| Conservative | M. Davies^{o} | 1,148 | 49.7 | |
| Alliance (SDP) | G. Hallett | 754 | 32.6 | |
| Labour | W. Davies | 408 | 17.7 | |
| Majority | | | | |
| Turnout | | | 50.9 | |
| Conservative win (new seat) | | | | |

=== Dinas Powys North ===
Dinas Powys North 1985
| Party | Candidate | Votes | % | ±% |
|---|---|---|---|---|
| Plaid Cymru | Chris Franks^{o} | 1,265 | 44.9 | |
| Conservative | B. McParlin | 1,001 | 35.5 | |
| Labour | G. Price | 319 | 11.3 | |
| Alliance (SDP) | J. Brooks | 234 | 8.3 | |
| Majority | | | | |
| Turnout | | | 55.8 | |
| Plaid Cymru win (new seat) | | | | |

=== Dinas Powys South ===
Dinas Powys South 1985
| Party | Candidate | Votes | % | ±% |
|---|---|---|---|---|
| Conservative | A. Hill | 1,011 | 41.2 | |
| Plaid Cymru | R. Reeves | 601 | 24.5 | |
| Alliance (SDP) | M. James | 435 | 17.7 | |
| Labour | S. Collins | 407 | 16.6 | |
| Majority | | | | |
| Turnout | | | 43.6 | |
| Conservative win (new seat) | | | | |

=== Dyfan ===
Dyfan 1985
| Party | Candidate | Votes | % | ±% |
|---|---|---|---|---|
| Labour | C. Watkins^{o} | 992 | 56.0 | |
| Conservative | J. Donovan | 779 | 44.0 | |
| Majority | | | | |
| Turnout | | | 43.6 | |
| Labour win (new seat) | | | | |

=== Eglwys Wen ===
Eglwys Wen 1985
| Party | Candidate | Votes | % | ±% |
|---|---|---|---|---|
| Conservative | W. Richards^{o} | 1,147 | 34.6 | |
| Labour | D. Hutchinson | 1,137 | 34.3 | |
| Alliance (SDP) | B. Jenkins | 918 | 27.7 | |
| Plaid Cymru | Alan Jobbins | 111 | 3.4 | |
| Majority | | 10 | | |
| Turnout | | | 55.6 | |
| Conservative win (new seat) | | | | |

=== Fairwater ===
Fairwater 1985
| Party | Candidate | Votes | % | ±% |
|---|---|---|---|---|
| Labour | D. Longden^{o} | 1,161 | 50.9 | |
| Conservative | B. Hall | 731 | 32.1 | |
| Alliance (SDP) | C. Colmar | 388 | 17.0 | |
| Majority | | | | |
| Turnout | | | 42.9 | |
| Labour win (new seat) | | | | |

=== Gabalfa ===
Gabalfa 1985
| Party | Candidate | Votes | % | ±% |
|---|---|---|---|---|
| Labour | D. Campbell^{o} | 1,243 | 52.9 | |
| Alliance (Liberal) | A. Llywellyn | 607 | 25.3 | |
| Conservative | D. Williams | 501 | 21.3 | |
| Majority | | | | |
| Turnout | | | 51.2 | |
| Labour win (new seat) | | | | |

=== Gibbonsdown ===
Gibbonsdown 1985
| Party | Candidate | Votes | % | ±% |
|---|---|---|---|---|
| Labour | B. Murray^{o} | 1,058 | 67.4 | |
| Conservative | D. Roberts | 280 | 17.8 | |
| Alliance (SDP) | D. Smith | 231 | 14.7 | |
| Majority | | | | |
| Turnout | | | 40.4 | |
| Labour win (new seat) | | | | |

=== Glan Ely ===
Glan Ely 1985
| Party | Candidate | Votes | % | ±% |
|---|---|---|---|---|
| Labour | Robert Morgan^{o} | 1,375 | 72.6 | |
| Alliance (SDP) | I. Sadler | 276 | 14.6 | |
| Conservative | D. Gillard | 243 | 12.8 | |
| Majority | | | | |
| Turnout | | | 34.1 | |
| Labour win (new seat) | | | | |

=== Heath Park ===
Heath Park 1985
| Party | Candidate | Votes | % | ±% |
|---|---|---|---|---|
| Conservative | J. Cronin^{o} | 1,088 | 50.5 | |
| Alliance (SDP) | E. Fitzgerald-Kuhl | 645 | 29.9 | |
| Labour | P. Hampleton | 421 | 19.5 | |
| Majority | | | | |
| Turnout | | | 40.3 | |
| Conservative win (new seat) | | | | |

=== Highmead ===
Highmead 1985
| Party | Candidate | Votes | % | ±% |
|---|---|---|---|---|
| Labour | H. Gough^{o} | 1,328 | 77.9 | |
| Conservative | H. Derrick | 359 | 18.5 | |
| Alliance (SDP) | M. Arcos | 258 | 13.3 | |
| Majority | | | | |
| Turnout | | | 36.7 | |
| Labour win (new seat) | | | | |

=== Illtyd ===
Illtyd 1985
| Party | Candidate | Votes | % | ±% |
|---|---|---|---|---|
| Conservative | E. Williams | 1,254 | 53.0 | |
| Labour | Chris Short | 1,111 | 47.0 | |
| Majority | | | | |
| Turnout | | | 41.3 | |
| Conservative gain from Labour | | Swing | | |

=== Lakeside ===
Lakeside 1985
| Party | Candidate | Votes | % | ±% |
|---|---|---|---|---|
| Alliance (SDP) | Anthony Jeremy | 1,651 | 58.6 | |
| Conservative | Peter Meyer^{o} | 901 | 32.0 | |
| Labour | M. Parkinson | 216 | 7.7 | |
| Plaid Cymru | K. Shore | 51 | 1.8 | |
| Majority | | | | |
| Turnout | | | 61.6 | |
| Alliance win (new seat) | | | | |

=== Landsdowne ===
Landsdowne 1985
| Party | Candidate | Votes | % | ±% |
|---|---|---|---|---|
| Labour | M. Trickey^{o} | 1,254 | 44.8 | |
| Conservative | Bella Brown^{o} | 963 | 34.4 | |
| Alliance (Liberal) | A. Wigley | 477 | 17.0 | |
| Plaid Cymru | D. Burns | 66 | 2.4 | |
| Independent | W. Turner | 41 | 1.5 | |
| Majority | | | | |
| Turnout | | | 47.6 | |
| Labour win (new seat) | | | | |

=== Lisvane with St Mellons ===
Lisvane with St Mellons 1985
| Party | Candidate | Votes | % | ±% |
|---|---|---|---|---|
| Conservative | J. Lysaght* | 907 | 57.3 | |
| Alliance (SDP) | P. Ronson | 458 | 29.0 | |
| Labour | P. Creswick | 217 | 13.7 | |
| Majority | | | | |
| Turnout | | | 33.8 | |
| Conservative hold | | Swing | | |

=== Llandaff ===
Llandaff 1985
| Party | Candidate | Votes | % | ±% |
|---|---|---|---|---|
| Conservative | Julius Hermer^{o} | 1,346 | 48.7 | |
| Alliance (SDP) | W. Slack | 768 | 27.6 | |
| Labour | O. Lydiard | 412 | 14.9 | |
| Plaid Cymru | G. Jones | 239 | 8.6 | |
| Majority | | | | |
| Turnout | | | 41.3 | |
| Conservative win (new seat) | | | | |

=== Llandaff North ===
Llandaff North 1985
| Party | Candidate | Votes | % | ±% |
|---|---|---|---|---|
| Labour | A. Hearne^{o} | 1,574 | 59.5 | |
| Conservative | J. Donovan^{o} | 542 | 20.5 | |
| Alliance (Liberal) | E. Richards | 458 | 17.3 | |
| Independent | R. Randell | 72 | 2.7 | |
| Majority | | | | |
| Turnout | | | 43.0 | |
| Labour win (new seat) | | | | |

=== Llanedeyrn ===
Llanedeyrn 1985
| Party | Candidate | Votes | % | ±% |
|---|---|---|---|---|
| Alliance (SDP) | Vita Jones^{o} | 1,375 | 54.3 | |
| Labour | R. Longsworth | 674 | 26.6 | |
| Conservative | C. Tudor | 396 | 15.7 | |
| Plaid Cymru | A. Morgan | 85 | 3.4 | |
| Majority | | | | |
| Turnout | | | 37.8 | |
| Alliance win (new seat) | | | | |

=== Llanrumney North ===
Llanrumney North 1985
| Party | Candidate | Votes | % | ±% |
|---|---|---|---|---|
| Labour | P. Jarvis | 1,429 | 79.6 | |
| Conservative | T. Harvie | 367 | 20.4 | |
| Majority | | | | |
| Turnout | | | 38.5 | |
| Labour win (new seat) | | | | |

=== Llanrumney South ===
Llanrumney South 1985
| Party | Candidate | Votes | % | ±% |
|---|---|---|---|---|
| Labour | D. Francis | 1,139 | 47.7 | |
| Alliance (SDP) | E. Morgan | 819 | 34.3 | |
| Conservative | S. Woods | 430 | 18.0 | |
| Majority | | | | |
| Turnout | | | 49.6 | |
| Labour win (new seat) | | | | |

=== Mackintosh ===
Mackintosh 1985
| Party | Candidate | Votes | % | ±% |
|---|---|---|---|---|
| Labour | Julie Morgan | 1,024 | 37.5 | |
| Alliance (Liberal) | G. Harris | 1,009 | 37.0 | |
| Conservative | S. James | 611 | 22.4 | |
| Plaid Cymru | R. Bevan | 61 | 2.2 | |
| Communist | R. Spencer | 23 | 0.8 | |
| Majority | | 15 | 0.5 | |
| Turnout | | | | |
| Labour win (new seat) | | | | |

=== Maindy ===
Maindy 1985
| Party | Candidate | Votes | % | ±% |
|---|---|---|---|---|
| Alliance (Liberal) | David Rees^{o} | 1,395 | 48.2 | |
| Labour | M. Harris | 974 | 33.7 | |
| Conservative | A. Dixon | 439 | 15.2 | |
| Plaid Cymru | G. Powell | 84 | 2.9 | |
| Majority | | | | |
| Turnout | | | 52.5 | |
| Alliance win (new seat) | | | | |

=== North Whitchurch with Tongwynlais ===
North Whitchurch with Tongwynlais 1985
| Party | Candidate | Votes | % | ±% |
|---|---|---|---|---|
| Conservative | R. Evans^{o} | 1,164 | 41.9 | |
| Labour | T. Crews | 896 | 33.7 | |
| Alliance (SDP) | J. May | 619 | 22.3 | |
| Plaid Cymru | J. Dunstan | 102 | 3.7 | |
| Majority | | | | |
| Turnout | | | 49.2 | |
| Conservative win (new seat) | | | | |

=== Pantllacca ===
Pantllacca 1985
| Party | Candidate | Votes | % | ±% |
|---|---|---|---|---|
| Alliance (Liberal) | A. Thomas^{o} | 1,123 | 54.5 | |
| Labour | M. Phelps | 482 | 23.4 | |
| Conservative | M. Wigmore^{o} | 454 | 22.0 | |
| Majority | | | | |
| Turnout | | | 40.6 | |
| Alliance win (new seat) | | | | |

=== Pantmawr ===
Pantmawr 1985
| Party | Candidate | Votes | % | ±% |
|---|---|---|---|---|
| Conservative | Gareth Neale^{o} | 1,367 | 51.3 | |
| Alliance (SDP) | H. Howell | 821 | 30.8 | |
| Labour | I. Faroogi | 347 | 13.0 | |
| Plaid Cymru | L. Evans | 132 | 4.9 | |
| Majority | | | | |
| Turnout | | | 52.3 | |
| Conservative win (new seat) | | | | |

=== Park ===
Park 1985
| Party | Candidate | Votes | % | ±% |
|---|---|---|---|---|
| Labour | R. Austin | 900 | 37.9 | |
| Conservative | Olwen Watkin^{o} | 813 | 34.3 | |
| Alliance (Liberal) | A. Powell | 563 | 23.7 | |
| Plaid Cymru | Sian Caiach | 71 | 3.0 | |
| Communist | S. Jones | 25 | 1.1 | |
| Majority | | | | |
| Turnout | | | 34.9 | |
| Labour win (new seat) | | | | |

=== Pentre Bane ===
Pentre Bane 1985
| Party | Candidate | Votes | % | ±% |
|---|---|---|---|---|
| Labour | Caerwyn Roderick^{o} | 1,065 | 49.9 | |
| Alliance (SDP) | D. Griffin | 694 | 32.5 | |
| Conservative | T. Canfield | 328 | 15.4 | |
| Plaid Cymru | C. Henri | 46 | 2.2 | |
| Majority | | | | |
| Turnout | | | 42.4 | |
| Labour win (new seat) | | | | |

=== Penylan ===
Penylan 1985
| Party | Candidate | Votes | % | ±% |
|---|---|---|---|---|
| Conservative | Ian Hermer^{o} | 1,027 | 46.0 | |
| Alliance (Liberal) | J. Hanlan | 847 | 37.9 | |
| Labour | R. Rees | 360 | 16.1 | |
| Majority | | | | |
| Turnout | | | 47.1 | |
| Conservative win (new seat) | | | | |

=== Plymouth ===
Plymouth 1985
| Party | Candidate | Votes | % | ±% |
|---|---|---|---|---|
| Conservative | P. Lloyd^{o} | 1,128 | 53.4 | |
| Alliance (Liberal) | P. Dresser | 573 | 27.1 | |
| Labour | Lorraine Barrett | 410 | 19.4 | |
| Majority | | | | |
| Turnout | | | 49.0 | |
| Conservative win (new seat) | | | | |

=== Pontcanna ===
Pontcanna 1985
| Party | Candidate | Votes | % | ±% |
|---|---|---|---|---|
| Labour | Mark Drakeford | 1,122 | 49.6 | |
| Conservative | J. Hallinan | 721 | 31.9 | |
| Alliance (SDP) | A. Evans | 186 | 8.2 | |
| Plaid Cymru | N. Hodges | 129 | 5.7 | |
| Independent | S. Scanlon | 105 | 4.6 | |
| Majority | | | | |
| Turnout | | | 44.8 | |
| Labour win (new seat) | | | | |

=== Radyr with St Fagans ===
Radyr with St Fagans 1985
| Party | Candidate | Votes | % | ±% |
|---|---|---|---|---|
| Alliance (SDP) | Marian Drake | 1,191 | 49.6 | |
| Conservative | W. Clarke^{o} | 968 | 40.3 | |
| Labour | P. Gunn | 243 | 10.1 | |
| Majority | | | | |
| Turnout | | | 61.4 | |
| Alliance gain from Conservative | | Swing | | |

=== Rhoose with Llancarfan ===
Rhoose with Llancarfan 1985
| Party | Candidate | Votes | % | ±% |
|---|---|---|---|---|
| Conservative | H. James | 860 | 49.7 | |
| Alliance (SDP) | P. Morris | 642 | 27.5 | |
| Labour | J. Dole | 630 | 27.0 | |
| Independent | K. Bowles^{o} | 205 | 8.8 | |
| Majority | | | | |
| Turnout | | | 59.6 | |
| Conservative hold | | Swing | | |

=== Riverside South ===
Riverside South 1985
| Party | Candidate | Votes | % | ±% |
|---|---|---|---|---|
| Labour | Jane Hutt^{o} | 1,292 | 70.3 | |
| Conservative | D. Mutton | 357 | 19.4 | |
| Alliance (SDP) | J. Bayley | 190 | 10.3 | |
| Majority | | | | |
| Turnout | | | 43.3 | |
| Labour win (new seat) | | | | |

=== Rumney ===
Rumney 1985
| Party | Candidate | Votes | % | ±% |
|---|---|---|---|---|
| Labour | A. Huish^{o} | 1,477 | 47.2 | |
| Conservative | N. Smith | 1,173 | 37.5 | |
| Alliance (SDP) | M. Morgan | 479 | 15.3 | |
| Majority | | | | |
| Turnout | | | 46.2 | |
| Labour win (new seat) | | | | |

=== Saltmead ===
Saltmead 1985
| Party | Candidate | Votes | % | ±% |
|---|---|---|---|---|
| Labour | D. Richards^{o} | 1,338 | 60.0 | |
| Conservative | L. Quinn | 891 | 40.0 | |
| Majority | | | | |
| Turnout | | | 46.7 | |
| Labour win (new seat) | | | | |

=== Splott ===
Splott 1985
| Party | Candidate | Votes | % | ±% |
|---|---|---|---|---|
| Labour | Jack Brooks^{o} | 1,326 | 74.7 | |
| Conservative | M. Mason | 449 | 25.3 | |
| Majority | | | | |
| Turnout | | | 36.4 | |
| Labour win (new seat) | | | | |

=== St Athan with Boverton ===
St Athan with Boverton 1985
| Party | Candidate | Votes | % | ±% |
|---|---|---|---|---|
| Conservative | J. George^{o} | 679 | 40.9 | |
| Labour | M. Pember | 573 | 34.5 | |
| Alliance (SDP) | E. Owen | 410 | 24.7 | |
| Majority | | | | |
| Turnout | | | 34.0 | |
| Conservative win (new seat) | | | | |

=== St Augustines ===
St Augustines 1985
| Party | Candidate | Votes | % | ±% |
|---|---|---|---|---|
| Labour | P. Gray^{o} | 804 | 40.0 | |
| Alliance (Liberal) | S. Greensmith | 609 | 30.3 | |
| Conservative | J. Robinson | 595 | 29.6 | |
| Majority | | | | |
| Turnout | | | 44.8 | |
| Labour win (new seat) | | | | |

=== Stanwell ===
Stanwell 1985
| Party | Candidate | Votes | % | ±% |
|---|---|---|---|---|
| Labour | I. Dewar | 611 | 35.3 | |
| Conservative | J. Flanigan | 575 | 33.3 | |
| Plaid Cymru | D. Haswell | 404 | 23.4 | |
| Alliance (Liberal) | E. Humphreys | 139 | 8.0 | |
| Majority | | | | |
| Turnout | | | 57.0 | |
| Labour win (new seat) | | | | |

=== The Marl ===
The Marl 1985
| Party | Candidate | Votes | % | ±% |
|---|---|---|---|---|
| Labour | Peter Perkins^{o} | 1,007 | 61.3 | |
| Conservative | J. Turnbull | 567 | 34.5 | |
| Plaid Cymru | M. Ryan | 70 | 4.3 | |
| Majority | | | | |
| Turnout | | | 39.8 | |
| Labour win (new seat) | | | | |

=== Thornhill ===
Thornhill 1985
| Party | Candidate | Votes | % | ±% |
|---|---|---|---|---|
| Alliance (SDP) | T. Fitzgerald-Kuhl | 1,121 | 38.6 | |
| Labour | R. Hughes | 1,093 | 37.6 | |
| Conservative | V. Kempton | 692 | 23.8 | |
| Majority | | | | |
| Turnout | | | 44.0 | |
| Alliance win (new seat) | | | | |

=== Ton-yr-Ywen ===
Ton-yr-Ywen 1985
| Party | Candidate | Votes | % | ±% |
|---|---|---|---|---|
| Conservative | B. Rees^{o} | 977 | 50.0 | |
| Alliance (SDP) | E. Chamberlain | 531 | 27.2 | |
| Labour | E. Scheeres | 447 | 22.9 | |
| Majority | | | | |
| Turnout | | | 45.8 | |
| Conservative win (new seat) | | | | |

=== Trelai ===
Trelai 1985
| Party | Candidate | Votes | % | ±% |
|---|---|---|---|---|
| Labour | Emyr Currie-Jones^{o} | 755 | 48.1 | |
| Alliance (SDP) | Jacqui Gasson | 545 | 34.7 | |
| Conservative | A. Renwick | 192 | 12.2 | |
| Independent | G. Jones | 77 | 4.9 | |
| Majority | | | | |
| Turnout | | | 39.8 | |
| Labour win (new seat) | | | | |

=== Tremorfa ===
Tremorfa 1985
| Party | Candidate | Votes | % | ±% |
|---|---|---|---|---|
| Labour | Gordon Houlston^{o} | 1,119 | 86.8 | |
| Conservative | A. Kelly | 170 | 13.2 | |
| Majority | | | | |
| Turnout | | | 44.3 | |
| Labour win (new seat) | | | | |

=== Trowbridge ===
Trowbridge 1985
| Party | Candidate | Votes | % | ±% |
|---|---|---|---|---|
| Labour | W. Bowen^{o} | 1,605 | 77.9 | |
| Conservative | G. Lowder | 455 | 22.1 | |
| Majority | | | | |
| Turnout | | | 27.7 | |
| Labour win (new seat) | | | | |

=== Ty Glas ===
Ty Glas 1985
| Party | Candidate | Votes | % | ±% |
|---|---|---|---|---|
| Conservative | Greville Tatham^{o} | 835 | 39.4 | |
| Labour | J. Lewis | 721 | 34.1 | |
| Alliance (SDP) | P. Riding | 561 | 26.5 | |
| Majority | | | | |
| Turnout | | | 56.4 | |
| Conservative win (new seat) | | | | |

=== Vale of Glamorgan North East ===
Vale of Glamorgan North East 1985
| Party | Candidate | Votes | % | ±% |
|---|---|---|---|---|
| Conservative | M. Edmonds | 953 | 52.1 | |
| Alliance (SDP) | Peter Sain Ley Berry | 556 | 30.4 | |
| Labour | C. Collines | 236 | 12.9 | |
| Plaid Cymru | Harri Pritchard-Jones | 85 | 4.6 | |
| Majority | | | | |
| Turnout | | | 48.9 | |
| Conservative win (new seat) | | | | |

=== Vale of Glamorgan South West ===
Vale of Glamorgan South West 1985
| Party | Candidate | Votes | % | ±% |
|---|---|---|---|---|
| Labour | L. Hughes | 1,266 | 56.7 | |
| Conservative | R. Morrish | 653 | 29.3 | |
| Alliance (SDP) | D. Britton | 313 | 14.0 | |
| Majority | | | | |
| Turnout | | | 47.9 | |
| Labour win (new seat) | | | | |

=== Waterloo ===
Waterloo 1985
| Party | Candidate | Votes | % | ±% |
|---|---|---|---|---|
| Alliance (Liberal) | L. Kelloway | 1,132 | 47.4 | |
| Labour | A. Pithouse^{o} | 627 | 26.2 | |
| Conservative | R. Richard | 587 | 24.6 | |
| Plaid Cymru | B. Smith | 44 | 1.8 | |
| Majority | | | | |
| Turnout | | | 53.2 | |
| Alliance win (new seat) | | | | |

KEY

* existing councillor, for the same ward
^{o} existing councillor, though because of boundary changes not for the same ward
