= 1981 South Glamorgan County Council election =

1981 Welsh local government election

The third election to South Glamorgan County Council was held in May 1981. It was preceded by the 1977 election and followed by the 1985 election.

== Boundary changes ==
There were no boundary changes at this election.

== Candidates ==
As in previous elections, Conservative and Labour candidates contested the vast majority of seats, with an increased number of Liberal candidates. There were a smaller number of Plaid Cymru and Ecology Party candidates and a few Independents.

== Outcome ==
Having lost control of the authority in 1977, Labour regained control with sweeping gains across the wards. The Liberals also made some advances in central Cardiff.

== Ward results ==
=== Adamsdown (two seats) ===
Adamsdown 1981
Party	Candidate	Votes	%	±%
Labour	D. Evans*	1,251		
Labour	Kenneth Hutchings	1,234		
Conservative	W. Lewis	344		
Conservative	T. Hobbs	314		
Turnout				
Labour hold		Swing		
Labour hold		Swing		

=== Barry, Baruc (one seat) ===
Barry, Baruc 1981
Party	Candidate	Votes	%	±%
Conservative	E. Jones*	1,380		
Labour	C. Short	889		
Turnout				
Conservative hold		Swing		

=== Barry, Buttrills (one seat) ===
Barry, Buttrills 1981
Party	Candidate	Votes	%	±%
Labour	R. Lane	976		
Conservative	E. Evans*	626		
Turnout				
Labour gain from Conservative		Swing		

=== Barry, Cadoc (one seat) ===
Barry, Cadoc 1981
Party	Candidate	Votes	%	±%
Labour	F. Cook	1,048		
Conservative	J. Whitchurch*	850		
Plaid Cymru	B. Greaves	80		
Turnout				
Labour gain from Conservative		Swing		

=== Barry, Castleland (one seat) ===
Barry, Castleland 1981
Party	Candidate	Votes	%	±%
Labour	M. Sharp	1,012		
Conservative	K. Jones	431		
Turnout				
Labour gain from Conservative		Swing		

=== Barry, Court (two seats) ===
Barry, Court 1981
Party	Candidate	Votes	%	±%
Labour	S. James	1,319		
Labour	Mick Antoniw	1,198		
Conservative	M. Davies*	750		
Conservative	M. Walnycki*	632		
Plaid Cymru	R. Perriam	125		
Turnout				
Labour gain from Conservative		Swing		
Labour gain from Conservative		Swing		

=== Barry, Dyfan (two seats) ===
Barry, Dyfan 1981
Party	Candidate	Votes	%	±%
Labour	B. Murray	2,037		
Labour	C. Watkins*	1,984		
Conservative	J. Donovan	1,068		
Conservative	R. Gibbons	1.041		
Turnout				
Labour hold		Swing		
Labour hold		Swing		

=== Barry, Illtyd (one seat) ===
Barry, Castleland 1981
Party	Candidate	Votes	%	±%
Labour	J. Tabernacle	1,088		
Conservative	G. Mackillican*	1,074		
Turnout				
Labour gain from Conservative		Swing		

=== Canton (two seats) ===
Canton 1981
Party	Candidate	Votes	%	±%
Labour	M. Trickway	1,333		
Conservative	Bella Brown*	1,328		
Labour	T. Crews	1,236		
Conservative	Trevor C. Tyrrell*	1,113		
Liberal	A. Williams	299		
Liberal	P. Deogan	274		
Turnout				
Labour gain from Conservative		Swing		
Conservative hold		Swing		

=== Cardiff Rural No.1 (one seat) ===
Cardiff Rural No.1 1981
Party	Candidate	Votes	%	±%
Conservative	B. Clarke	1,441		
Labour	B. Edwards	842		
Turnout				
Conservative gain from Plaid Cymru		Swing		

=== Cardiff Rural No.3, Dinas Powys (two seats) ===
Cardiff Rural No.3, Dinas Powys 1981
Party	Candidate	Votes	%	±%
Conservative	B. Jones*	1,635		
Plaid Cymru	Chris Franks	1,537		
Conservative	A. Beavan	1,511		
Plaid Cymru	A. Roper	1,030		
Labour	T. Davies	788		
Liberal	J. Baker	392		
Liberal	S. Bakes	370		
Independent	T. Roberts	128		
Turnout				
Conservative hold		Swing		
Plaid Cymru gain from Conservative		Swing		

=== Cardiff Rural No.4, Wenvoe (one seat) ===
Cardiff Rural No.4, Wenvoe 1981
Party	Candidate	Votes	%	±%
Conservative	C. Rush*	Unopposed		
Conservative hold		Swing		

=== Cardiff Rural No.5, Rhoose (one seat) ===
Cardiff Rural No.5, Rhoose 1981
Party	Candidate	Votes	%	±%
Conservative	K. Bowles	1,133		
Labour	A. German	787		
Turnout				
Conservative hold		Swing		

=== Cardiff South (two seats) ===
Cardiff South 1981
Party	Candidate	Votes	%	±%
Labour	Peter Perkins	1,569		
Labour	D. Richards	1,527		
Conservative	M. Moorcroft	747		
Conservative	F. Arnold	694		
Liberal	J. Williams	152		
Liberal	J. Coley	142		
Turnout				
Labour hold		Swing		
Labour hold		Swing		

=== Cathays (three seats) ===
Cathays 1981
Party	Candidate	Votes	%	±%
Liberal	W. Matthews	2,110		
Liberal	G. Snell	2,107		
Liberal	David Rees	1,956		
Labour	T. Sweeney	1,243		
Labour	A. Thompson	1,186		
Labour	D. Francies	1,156		
Conservative	E. Chichister*	904		
Conservative	M. Adams	844		
Conservative	B. Jones	804		
Plaid Cymru	T. O'Neill	200		
Plaid Cymru	D. Tilley	173		
Plaid Cymru	R. Clancy	150		
Turnout				
Liberal gain from Conservative		Swing		
Liberal gain from Conservative		Swing		
Liberal gain from Conservative		Swing		

=== Central (two seats) ===
Central 1981
Party	Candidate	Votes	%	±%
Labour	C. Champion	780		
Labour	H. Rhoden	701		
Liberal	R. Hill	570		
Liberal	A. Miles	500		
Conservative	P. Lowes	446		
Conservative	C. Thomas*	434		
Ecology	K. Pearson	128		
Turnout				
Labour gain from Conservative		Swing		
Labour gain from Conservative		Swing		

=== Cowbridge No.1 (one seat) ===
Cowbridge No.1 1981
Party	Candidate	Votes	%	±%
Conservative	R. Thomas	1,787		
Labour	J. Jones	698		
Liberal	M. Weston	428		
Turnout				
Conservative hold		Swing		

=== Cowbridge No.2 (two seats) ===
Cowbridge No.2 1981
Party	Candidate	Votes	%	±%
Conservative	P. Jones	1,632		
Conservative	J. George*	1,625		
Labour	G. Rees	1,180		
Independent	D. Hardie	938		
Labour	M. Pember	904		
Independent	C. Thomson	719		
Turnout				
Conservative hold		Swing		
Conservative gain from Independent		Swing		

=== Ely (four seats) ===
Ely 1981
Party	Candidate	Votes	%	±%
Labour	Robert Morgan*	2,800		
Labour	H. Gough	2,607		
Labour	B. Phillips	2,480		
Labour	Emyr Currie-Jones	2,478		
Conservative	G. Derrick	1,023		
Conservative	R. Benson	1,016		
Conservative	J. Rushrod	1,010		
Conservative	S. Jose	997		
Ecology	G. Jones	720		
Turnout				
Labour hold		Swing		
Labour hold		Swing		
Labour hold		Swing		
Labour hold		Swing		

=== Gabalfa (three seats) ===
Gabalfa 1981
Party	Candidate	Votes	%	±%
Labour	J. Davies	2,058		
Labour	A. Hearne	1,995		
Labour	A. Huish	1,925		
Conservative	T. Merridew*	1,393		
Conservative	C. Saunders*	1,371		
Conservative	V. Kempton	1,358		
Plaid Cymru	L. Evans	401		
Turnout				
Labour hold		Swing		
Labour gain from Conservative		Swing		
Labour gain from Conservative		Swing		

=== Grangetown (two seats) ===
Grangetown 1981
Party	Candidate	Votes	%	±%
Labour	D. Lydiard	1,679		
Labour	G. Gallagher	1,626		
Conservative	L. Quinn*	1,384		
Conservative	N. Leworthy	1,007		
Liberal	I. Taher	174		
Liberal	P. Verma	129		
Turnout				
Labour gain from Conservative		Swing		
Labour gain from Conservative		Swing		

=== Lisvane, Llanedeyrn and St Mellons (one seat) ===
Lisvane, Llanedeyrn and St Mellons 1981
Party	Candidate	Votes	%	±%
Conservative	J. Lysaght*	1,273		
Labour	S. Caeser	680		
Turnout				
Conservative hold		Swing		

=== Llandaff (three seats) ===
Llandaff 1981
Party	Candidate	Votes	%	±%
Conservative	Julius Hermer*	2,258		
Conservative	J. Donovan	2,230		
Conservative	M. Jones*	2,157		
Labour	G. Rhoden	1,010		
Labour	D. Jenkins	998		
Labour	W. Laing	948		
Plaid Cymru	G. Jones	508		
Plaid Cymru	J. Edwards	488		
Turnout				
Conservative hold		Swing		
Conservative hold		Swing		
Conservative hold		Swing		

=== Llanishen (four seats) ===
Llanishen 1981
Party	Candidate	Votes	%	±%
Conservative	T. Cronin*	3,351		
Conservative	F. Court	3,345		
Conservative	B. Rees*	3,335		
Conservative	G. Tatham*	3,286		
Labour	C. Jones	1,894		
Labour	R. Hughes	1,889		
Labour	D. Elwell	1,854		
Labour	E. Williams	1,776		
Ecology	M. Evans	887		
Plaid Cymru	D. Balch	457		
Turnout				
Conservative hold		Swing		
Conservative hold		Swing		
Conservative hold		Swing		
Conservative hold		Swing		

=== Penarth North/Central (one seats) ===
Penarth North/Central 1981
Party	Candidate	Votes	%	±%
Labour	P. Gray	843		
Conservative	P. Church	566		
Liberal	J. Janes	317		
Turnout				
Labour gain from Conservative		Swing		

=== Penarth South Ward (two seats) ===
Penarth South Ward 1981
Party	Candidate	Votes	%	±%
Conservative	W. Goddard*	1,525		
Conservative	P. Lloyd	1,495		
Labour	I. Boyce	433		
Labour	L. Barrett	418		
Liberal	A. Jones	397		
Liberal	M. Jones	350		
Turnout				
Conservative hold		Swing		
Conservative hold		Swing		

=== Penarth West (one seat) ===
Penarth West 1981
Party	Candidate	Votes	%	±%
Conservative	S. Thomas*	1,499		
Labour	E. Tincknell	1,457		
Conservative	E. Lloyd*	1,429		
Labour	K. Nelson	1,415		
Liberal	E. Humphreys	680		
Plaid Cymru	A. Packer	279		
Turnout				
Conservative hold		Swing		
Labour gain from Conservative		Swing		

=== Penylan (five seats) ===
Penylan 1981
Party	Candidate	Votes	%	±%
Conservative	C. Peterson*	5,136		
Conservative	Peter Meyer*	5,097		
Conservative	A. Thomas*	5,047		
Conservative	Stefan Terlezki*	5,040		
Conservative	M. Wigmore	4,924		
Liberal	D. Hill	3,722		
Liberal	P. Bramall	3,381		
Liberal	I. Foster	3,372		
Liberal	C, Mitchell	3,277		
Liberal	G. Sagoo	2,918		
Labour	C. Evans	2,186		
Labour	P. Malekin	2,065		
Labour	M. Phelps	2,041		
Labour	P. Williams	2,010		
Labour	D. Richards	1,998		
Plaid Cymru	A. Morgan	652		
Turnout				
Conservative hold		Swing		
Conservative hold		Swing		
Conservative hold		Swing		
Conservative hold		Swing		
Conservative hold		Swing		

=== Plas Mawr (four seats) ===
Former Labour MP Caerwyn Roderick was among the successful candidates in this ward. Former Penylan councilor Mary Hallinan sought to retain a seat for the Conservatives but was defeated.

Plas Mawr 1981
Party	Candidate	Votes	%	±%
Labour	D. Longden	2,743		
Labour	J. Lewis	2,722		
Labour	Caerwyn Roderick	2,609		
Labour	G. Brooks	2,543		
Conservative	B. Hall*	1,595		
Conservative	H. Phillips	1,559		
Conservative	E. Clarke	1,498		
Conservative	Mary Hallinan°	1,494		
Turnout				
Labour hold		Swing		
Labour gain from Conservative		Swing		
Labour gain from Conservative		Swing		
Labour gain from Plaid Cymru		Swing		

=== Plasnewydd (two seats) ===
Plasnewydd 1981
Party	Candidate	Votes	%	±%
Conservative	Olwen Watkin*	1,253		
Labour	F. Dobbs	1,188		
Conservative	S. James*	1,149		
Liberal	P. Jarman	1,049		
Labour	C. Richards	997		
Liberal	P. Davies	898		
Plaid Cymru	Owen John Thomas	291		
Plaid Cymru	G. Rees	181		
Communist	R. Macmillan	97		
Turnout				
Conservative hold		Swing		
Labour gain from Conservative		Swing		

=== Rhiwbina (three seats) ===
Rhiwbina 1981
Party	Candidate	Votes	%	±%
Conservative	M. Davies*	2,929		
Conservative	Gareth Neale*	2,770		
Conservative	W. Bain*	2,727		
Liberal	S. Crossley	1,651		
Labour	P. MacCormack	970		
Labour	J. Cocks	967		
Labour	A. Davies	901		
Plaid Cymru	P. Richards	368		
Turnout				
Conservative hold		Swing		
Conservative hold		Swing		
Conservative hold		Swing		

=== Riverside (two seats) ===
Riverside 1981
Party	Candidate	Votes	%	±%
Labour	Jane Hutt	1,429		
Labour	D. Campbell	1,363		
Conservative	R. Souza*	980		
Conservative	F. Cooper	941		
Ecology	Peter Bridger	338		
Turnout				
Labour gain from Conservative		Swing		
Labour gain from Conservative		Swing		

=== Roath (three seats) ===
Roath 1981
Party	Candidate	Votes	%	±%
Conservative	I. Hermer*	2,193		
Conservative	F. McCarthy*	2,167		
Conservative	R. Richards*	2,156		
Labour	T. Tucker	976		
Labour	N. Davies	972		
Labour	A. Rannasut	877		
Liberal	M. Davies	792		
Plaid Cymru	B. Smith	249		
Plaid Cymru	D. Smith	224		
Turnout				
Conservative hold		Swing		
Conservative hold		Swing		
Conservative hold		Swing		

=== Rumney (five seats) ===
Rumney 1981
Party	Candidate	Votes	%	±%
Labour	Vita Jones	4,273		
Labour	W. Bowen	4,236		
Labour	F. Yeomans	4,077		
Labour	R. Morris	4,026		
Labour	A. Pithouse	4,021		
Conservative	S. Brown	2,019		
Conservative	I. Davis	1,924		
Conservative	N. Smith*	1,910		
Conservative	C. Nicholson*	1,901		
Conservative	M. Battistea	1,896		
Liberal	J. Cuff	888		
Turnout				
Labour hold		Swing		
Labour hold		Swing		
Labour gain from Conservative		Swing		
Labour gain from Conservative		Swing		
Labour gain from Conservative		Swing		

=== Splott (three seats) ===
Splott 1981
Party	Candidate	Votes	%	±%
Labour	Gordon Houlston*	1,811		
Labour	John Brooks*	1,734		
Labour	W. Kitson	1,654		
Conservative	F. Chichister	809		
Conservative	A. Hopkins	754		
Conservative	R. Jones	722		
Turnout				
Labour hold		Swing		
Labour hold		Swing		
Labour hold		Swing		

=== Whitchurch (three seats) ===
Whitchurch 1981
Party	Candidate	Votes	%	±%
Conservative	David Purnell*	2,793		
Conservative	R. Evans*	2,733		
Conservative	W. Richards*	2,721		
Labour	C. Fennessy	1,607		
Labour	B. Bowler	1,591		
Labour	A. Parsons	1,486		
Plaid Cymru	I. Williams	461		
Turnout				
Conservative hold		Swing		
Conservative hold		Swing		
Conservative gain from Labour		Swing		
