= Mick Antoniw =

Welsh politician (born 1954)

- Мік Антонів
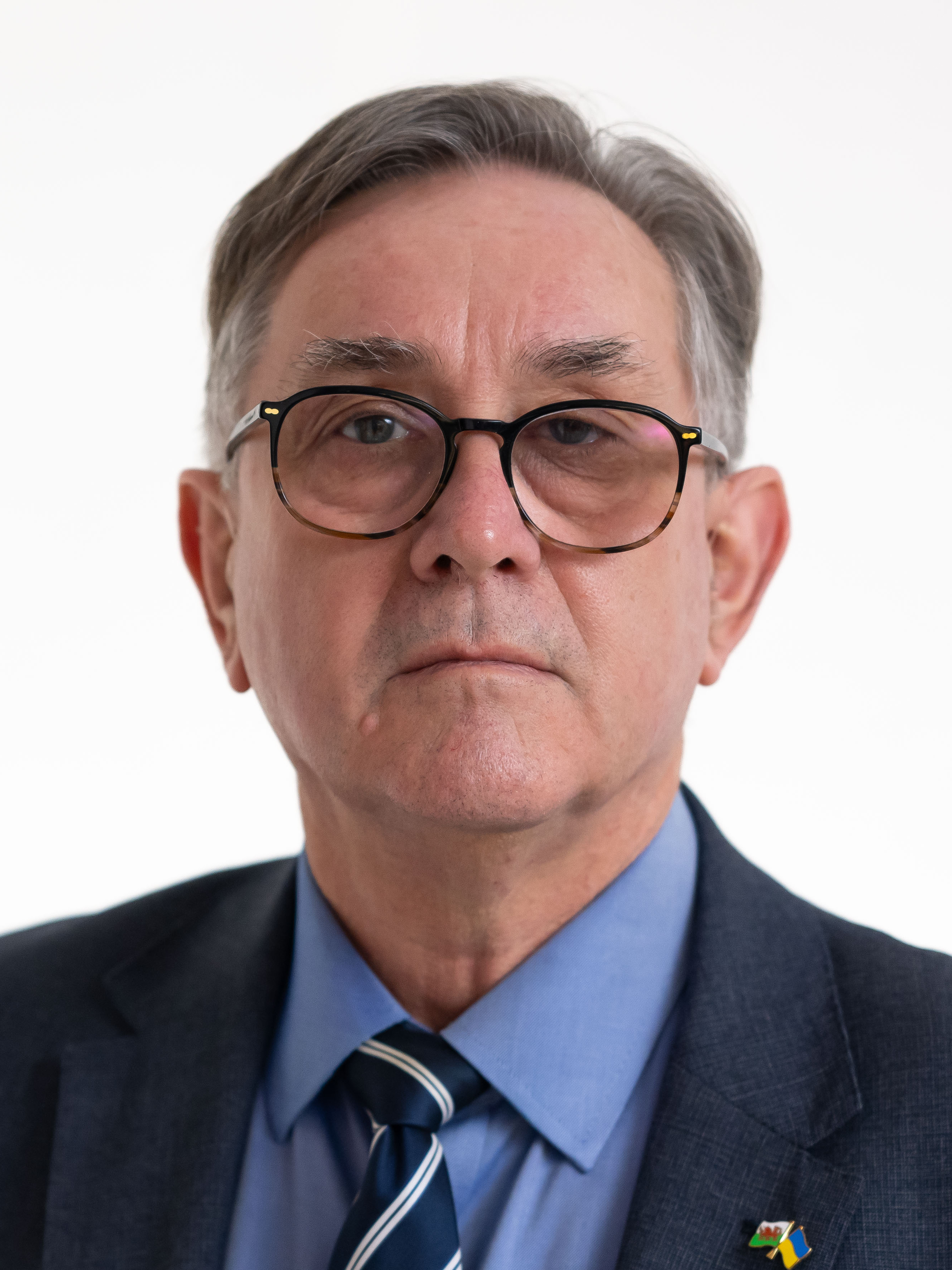
- Official portrait, 2024

Counsel General for Wales
- In office 13 May 2021 – 16 July 2024
- First Minister: Mark Drakeford; Vaughan Gething
- Preceded by: Jeremy Miles
- Succeeded by: Elisabeth Jones (designate); Julie James
- In office 27 June 2016 – 14 November 2017
- First Minister: Carwyn Jones
- Preceded by: Theodore Huckle
- Succeeded by: Jeremy Miles

Minister for the Constitution
- In office 13 May 2021 – 20 March 2024
- First Minister: Mark Drakeford
- Preceded by: Office established
- Succeeded by: Rebecca Evans

Member of the Senedd for Pontypridd
- In office 6 May 2011 – 7 April 2026
- Preceded by: Jane Davidson
- Succeeded by: Seat abolished
- Majority: 5,328 (19.4%)

Personal details
- Born: 1 September 1954 (age 72) Reading, England
- Party: Labour Co-op
- Education: Cardiff Law School
- Occupation: Lawyer
- Website: WelshLabour.org

Mick Antoniw (Ukrainian: Мік Антонів; born 1 September 1954) is a Welsh Labour Co-op politician and lawyer, who was Counsel General for Wales from 2021 to 2024, having previously served in the position from 2016 to 2017. He also previously served as Minister for the Constitution from 2021 to 2024. He was the Member of the Senedd (MS) for Pontypridd from 2011 to 2026.

== Early life ==
Born in Reading, England in 1954, Antoniw comes from a Ukrainian family, with a Danish mother and a Ukrainian father who sought refugee status in the UK following World War II.

Antoniw came to Wales to study law at the Cardiff Law School in 1973. He was President of the National Union of Students Wales from 1977 to 1979.

== Professional career ==
He was a practising solicitor before his election to the Senedd, specialising in personal injury. Antoniw was a partner in Thompsons Solicitors, the specialist trade union solicitors, with whom he began his training in 1980. He is a trustee of the Welsh Refugee Council.

== Personal life ==
Antoniw fostered dozens of children in the 15 years prior to his election, saying "When you are fostering, it brings immense quality. It is very challenging – and can be dependent on the nature of the fostering, whether the child is disabled or older children where there are difficulties. But my experience in the mixture of fostering that we did, was that it does add value to your life. Seeing children developing and beginning to blossom to some extent during the fostering process is very rewarding."

== Political career ==
Antoniw was a leading member of the Wales Anti-apartheid Movement (WAAM) during the 1980s. In 1981, he was elected as a Labour councilor to the South Glamorgan County Council for the Court ward, gaining the seat from the Conservatives. He was re-elected in 1985 but did not seek re-election in 1989.

At the 2011 Welsh Assembly election, Antoniw increased the Labour vote with a swing of 18.8%. His 11,864 votes amounted to over 50% of the poll; his majority over the second-placed Welsh Liberal Democrats candidate, Mike Powell, was 7,694. At the 2016 Welsh Assembly election Antoniw's vote fell to 9,986 and his majority was reduced.

He was appointed as Counsel General for Wales in June 2016. However, he departed from this role in November 2017 as part of a Government reshuffle, being replaced by Jeremy Miles.

Antoniw is a fluent Ukrainian speaker and has used his knowledge of the language when meeting with Ukrainian officials including deputy prime minister Volodymyr Groysman at international summits, such as the European Union Committee of the Regions. He has stated that he is a supporter of Ukrainian accession to the European Union, a supporter of the country joining NATO, and does not support Ukrainian federalism. Antoniw visited Ukraine just prior to the 2022 Russian invasion of Ukraine alongside Plaid Cymru leader Adam Price in order to "show solidarity with workers and minorities" as they met workers, LGBTQ+ people, ethnic minorities and human rights defenders.

A self-described socialist, Antoniw endorsed Jeremy Corbyn's 2015 campaign for the leadership of the Labour Party, Mark Drakeford's 2018 Welsh Labour leadership bid, and Keir Starmer's candidacy in the 2020 Labour leadership election. In January 2019 Drakeford appointed Antoniw as Welsh representative on the party's National Executive Committee: however, Antoniw and Drakeford subsequently successfully campaigned for the position to be democratically elected by the Welsh Labour membership. Antoniw ran in the first election for the post in 2020, receiving endorsements from several trade unions including Unison, as well as Momentum, the Labour Representation Committee and the Campaign for Labour Party Democracy: however, he was defeated by former First Minister of Wales Carwyn Jones, who won 5,195 votes to Antoniw's 4,933.

In July 2024, Antoniw resigned from the Welsh Government, alongside three other cabinet members, from First Minister Vaughan Gething's government, prompting Gething's subsequent resignation as First Minister.

In January 2025, Antoniw announced he would be standing down at the 2026 Senedd election.

In 2026, he stood for election to the Labour Party's National Executive Committee. He lost the election to fellow former MS Ann Jones.

== Honours and awards ==
- Ukraine:
  - 2019: Third Class of the Order of Merit of Ukraine

Senedd
Preceded by Jane Davidson	Member of the Senedd for Pontypridd; 2011–2026	Succeeded by Constituency abolished
Legal offices
Preceded by Theodore Huckle	Counsel General for Wales; 2016–2017	Succeeded by Jeremy Miles
Preceded by Jeremy Miles	Counsel General for Wales; 2021–2024	Succeeded by
New title	Minister for the Constitution; 2021–2024	Succeeded by Rebecca Evans
