= Theodore Huckle =

Welsh barrister

Theodore Huckle KC
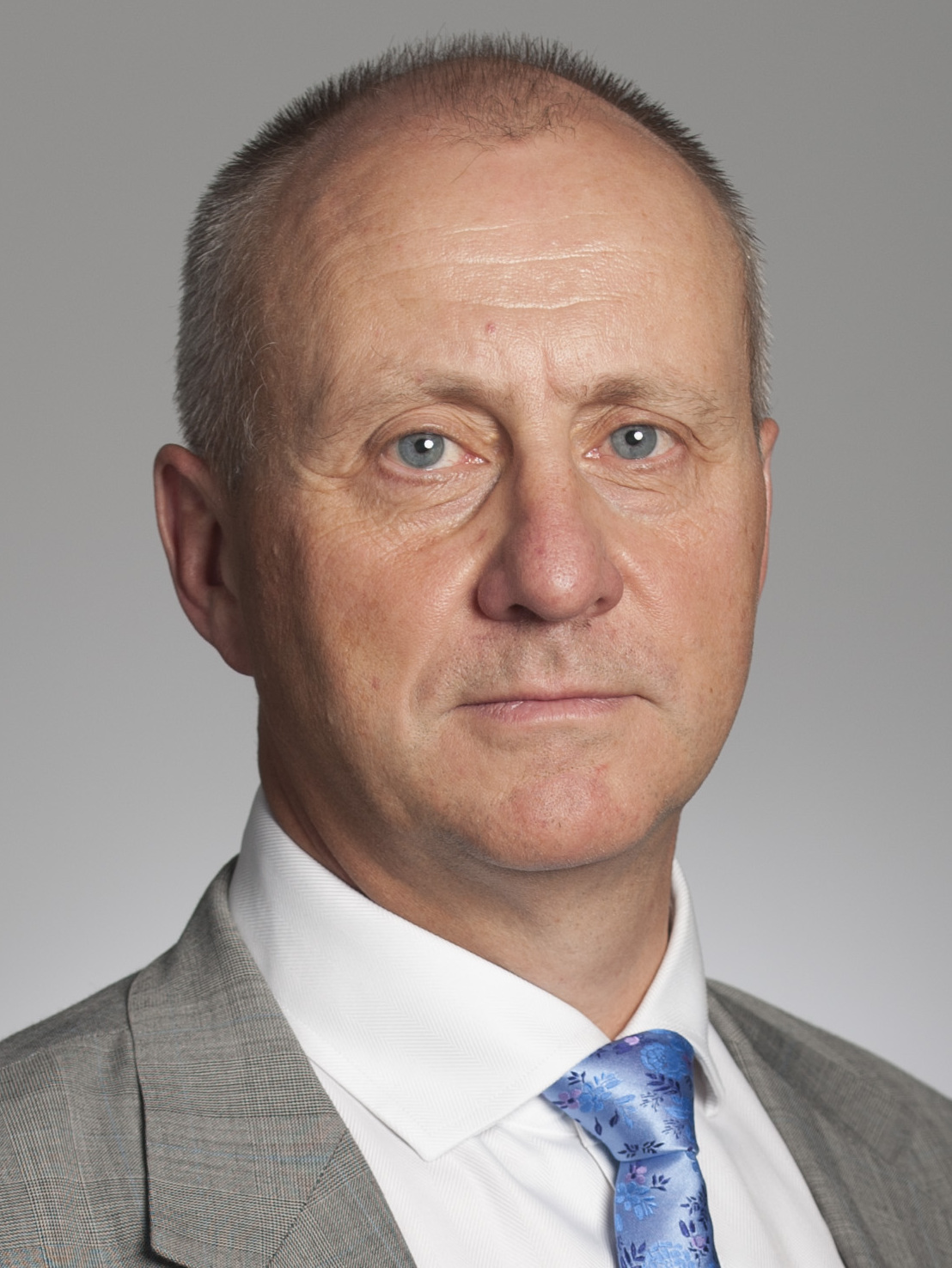

Counsel General for Wales
- In office 13 May 2011 – 27 June 2016
- First Minister: Carwyn Jones
- Preceded by: John Griffiths
- Succeeded by: Mick Antoniw

Personal details
- Born: Blaenavon, Mon.
- Spouse: Alison
- Children: Manon, Thea, Imogen and Fleur
- Education: Jesus College, Cambridge
- Profession: Barrister
- Website: theohucklekc.com

Theodore Huckle KC is a Welsh barrister. He served as the first independent professional Counsel General for Wales, the statutory Law Officer to the Welsh Government, during the governmental term of the 4th Assembly/Senedd. Upon nomination by the First Minister, his appointment was approved by the Senedd and formally made by the Queen on 21 July 2011, although he had been acting Counsel General from his birthday on 27 May 2011.

For further current information since 2016 see theohucklekc.com.

== Personal ==
Huckle lives near Cardiff with his family.

== Early life and education ==
Huckle was brought up in Blaenavon by his mother Sylvia (née Lewis) with his brother and two sisters. He was educated at primary and junior schools in Blaenavon and at Jones' West Monmouth Grammar School, Pontypool, before reading Law at Jesus College, Cambridge, where he took B.A., M.A. and LL.M. (International) degrees. He is a Titular Exhibitioner of Jesus College. He was admitted to Lincoln's Inn as a Hardwick Entrance Scholar and was in 1984 awarded the Megarry Major Scholarship.

== Career history ==
Huckle was called to the Bar in 1985. In 2008 he established Civitas Law chambers as the first specialist civil law chambers in Wales. He was appointed Queen's Counsel (QC) in 2011 (converted automatically to King's Counsel (KC) with the accession of King Charles III in 2022). With the agreement of the First Minister of Wales and the National Assembly for Wales Huckle continued in private practice as a QC during his appointment as Counsel General. In May 2015 he joined Doughty Street Chambers in London as a tenant whilst remaining a door tenant of Apex Chambers in Cardiff. From St David's Day 2021 he moved to sole practitioner status, maintaining associate memberships of Doughty Street, Apex Chambers (Cardiff), Cornwall St Chambers (Birmingham/Oxford/Shrewsbury) and No.18 Chambers (Southampton). In the Spring of 2024 he joined Old Square Chambers as a 'dual tenant', maintaining his (primary) sole practice alongside that tenancy.

In 2012 Huckle was elected a Master of the Bench (Bencher) of Lincoln's Inn. He served as the Inn's first liaison Bencher for the Wales & Chester Circuit during 2021-4 and is a member of the senior Audit & Risk Committee.

In 2016 Huckle was appointed visiting professor of Law the King's College, London and took up the role of General Editor of the Butterworths' Personal Injury Litigation Service of which he led the updating and full redevelopment until standing down in 2022.

Huckle's private practice profile includes complex clinical disputes and personal injury, including occupational illness/disease litigation, spinal, head injury and clinical negligence; public law, human rights and commercial matters including employment, fraud and professional negligence. Huckle is accredited as a mediator by ADR Group and QC Mediation, and as an arbitrator as a founder member of PIcARBS.

Huckle appeared for the Claimant Ms Baker in the first case of industrial "deafness" (noise-induced hearing loss) to be considered in the Supreme Court (or its predecessor Judicial Committee of the House of Lords): Baker v Quantum Clothing [2011] UKSC 17; [2011] 1 WLR 1003; [2011] ICR 523; [2011] PIQR P14.

As Counsel General for Wales (see below), he appeared in the 3 UK constitutional devolution references to the Supreme Court, leading respectively Clive Lewis QC (later Lewis LJ), Elizabeth Laing QC (later Laing LJ) and Richard Gordon QC.

== Counsel General for Wales ==
Huckle was appointed Counsel General Designate by the First Minister on 27 May 2011. The National Assembly for Wales gave its approval on 8 June 2011 and the appointment as Counsel General was formally made by Her Majesty the Queen on Friday 10 June 2011. The then Presiding Judge of the Wales Circuit, David Lloyd Jones J, undertook the swearing in ceremony on 13 June 2011.

Though not a Minister of the Welsh Government, the Counsel General for Wales is a member of Government under s45 of the Government of Wales Act 2006, senior and authoritative legal advisor to the Government, and its representative in the courts. The Counsel General has certain functions to be exercised independent of the Government, including the ability to refer Bills of the National Assembly to the Supreme Court for a decision on their legislative (constitutional) competence, which power Huckle exercised on one occasion (see below).

The office of Counsel General is at ministerial level and the Counsel General is bound by the Ministerial Code. The Counsel General may not be removed from the position except by resolution of the National Assembly for Wales itself.

Huckle is the first person not an Assembly Member to hold the office of Counsel General to the Welsh Government as a member of the Government and the only practising lawyer to hold this office. There was considerable interest in his appointment from outside Cardiff Bay, which was widely seen as a reflection of the newly enhanced legislative powers of the National Assembly and a desire on the part of the First Minister to bring additional legal rigour to the development and passage of legislation by the Assembly. He attended Cabinet at the invitation of the First Minister of Wales, Carwyn Jones. Huckle left the role in May 2016, at the end of the term of the Third Assembly and upon the formation of a new Welsh Government.

== Work as Counsel General ==
Axa v Lord Advocate [2011] UKSC 46; [2011] 3 W.L.R. 871

In one of his first actions as Counsel General for Wales, Huckle appeared in the Supreme Court of the United Kingdom in this case, which was an insurers' challenge to the validity of the Scottish Parliament's Act which overturned the ruling in the Pleural Plaques cases (Rothwell etc.) and made pleural plaques a sufficient injury to attract compensation. There were a number of issues considered by the Supreme Court but of particular interest for the Welsh devolution settlement was that the validity of the Scottish Act was questioned on common law grounds: it was argued by the appellants (insurance companies) that Acts of the Scottish Parliament are open to judicial review as an unreasonable, irrational and or arbitrary exercise of the legislative authority conferred by the Scotland Act 1998 on the Scottish Parliament.

If that contention was held to be right, then Acts of the National Assembly for Wales would similarly be open to judicial review on these grounds. Accordingly, the First Minister of Wales intervened in the appeal in the Supreme Court in order to make representations on the scope of common law challenge so far as Acts of the Assembly were concerned. Huckle appeared before the Supreme Court to make oral representations on behalf of the Welsh Government. This was the first time that the Counsel General for Wales (in the Law Officer role created by the Government of Wales Act 2006) has appeared on behalf of the Welsh Government in the highest court in the land. Lord Hope warmly welcomed the Counsel General to the Supreme Court for the first time in his new office. Huckle argued that the National Assembly for Wales was a democratically elected legislature and that the limits of its powers were set out in the Government of Wales Act 2006 which expressly enables the Assembly to make laws in the same way that the Westminster Parliament makes laws, so that the laws of the Assembly are to be viewed as equivalent in status to those of Westminster provided the Assembly is otherwise acting within the scope of its devolved authority. The Courts could not therefore impose additional limitations that fell outside the scope of the Scotland Act 1998 and, by implication, also the Government of Wales Act 2006.

In their judgment, the seven Supreme Court Justices unanimously agreed with the position of the Welsh Government. Their Lordships held that Acts of the Scottish Parliament could not be subject to judicial review at common law on the grounds of irrationality, unreasonableness or arbitrariness. Acts of the Scottish Parliament would only be open to challenge at common law on the grounds that they were not compatible with the rule of law or that they infringed fundamental rights. The Supreme Court confirmed that the same must apply equally to Acts of the National Assembly for Wales. Whilst the case focused on devolved legislation, some of their Lordships restated the possibility that even Acts of Parliament could be challenged where the legislation was such as to undermine the rule of law or fundamental rights (see Lord Steyn's observations in Jackson v AG [2005] UKHL 56), although this remains formally undecided.

Access to and rationalisation of Welsh Law

In his first formal statement to the National Assembly for Wales on 4 October 2011, Huckle announced Welsh Government's project to ensure easy public access to the increasing statutory law emanating from the National Assembly, and a review of methods of rationalisation and consolidation of those laws with existing provisions of the law of England & Wales.

Separate legal jurisdiction

On 27 March 2012, Huckle launched a public debate on whether Wales should be a separate legal jurisdiction by making a formal statement to the National Assembly for Wales and issuing a Welsh Government Consultation. He led for Welsh Government on this issue in order to promote and facilitate the public debate.

Reference to the Supreme Court of the Local Government Byelaws (Wales) Bill - Attorney General v National Assembly for Wales Commission [2012] UKSC 53; [2013] 1 A.C. 792; [2012] 3 W.L.R. 1294; [2013] 1 All E.R. 1013; Times, December 31, 2012

Huckle appeared for the Welsh Government before the UK Supreme Court in response to the first Reference of this type under s112 of the Government of Wales Act ("GOWA") 2006 by the Attorney General for England and Wales of the Local Government Byelaws (Wales) Bill 20, the first of the new Welsh Acts to be passed by the National Assembly (unanimously). The Bill provided for a new mechanism for creation of byelaws but without ministerial approval either in Cardiff or, crucially to the Reference, in Westminster, thus repealing the previous confirmation power of a Minister of the Crown. The Justices unanimously agreed that the Bill was within the competence of the National Assembly because the removal of the Minister of the Crown's function was "incidental to or consequential on" the inception of the new system and the removal of the concurrent function of the Welsh Ministers.

Reference to the Supreme Court of the Agricultural Sector (Wales) Bill - Attorney General for England and Wales v Counsel General for Wales [2014] UKSC 43; [2014] 1 W.L.R. 2622; [2014] 4 All E.R. 789; Times, July 14, 2014

The National Assembly passed this Bill to reinstate a form of Agricultural Wages Board (in an expanded functions form) after the abolition of the AWB across England & Wales by the Enterprise and Regulatory Reform Act 2013, notwithstanding the provisions of the Public Bodies Act 2011 which provided for the abolition of such "quangos" but subject to the consent of devolved legislatures where their legislative competence was engaged. Agriculture is a devolved subject under GOWA 2006, but the coalition government in Westminster contended that abolition (and creation) of an agricultural wages board did not "relate to" agriculture at all so as to engage the Assembly's competence within ss107-8 of GOWA 2006, but rather to "employment" which, it contended, was not a devolved subject, notwithstanding that it is neither described in the competence provisions of Schedule 7 to GOWA 2006 as a subject nor as an express exception to devolved competence, nor in the separate express restrictions on competence. The treatment of employment or employment law rights is thus different in the Welsh settlement to that of the Scottish, where employment law and rights are matters reserved to UK Parliament by the provisions of the Scotland Acts. Huckle again appeared for the Welsh Government to argue that the Assembly does have competence to legislate with respect to employment rights and law provided that the provisions doing so also "relate to" a devolved subject, in this case agriculture. The Supreme Court agreed and the reference was rejected unanimously by the 5-Justice panel.

Reference to the Supreme Court of the Recovery of Medical Costs for Asbestos Diseases (Wales) Bill [2015] UKSC 3; [2015] A.C. 1016; [2015] 2 W.L.R. 481; [2015] 2 All E.R. 899; [2015] H.R.L.R. 9; [2015] Lloyd's Rep. I.R. 474; (2015) 143 B.M.L.R. 1

Huckle referred this Bill for decision, to date the first and only exercise by a devolved law officer of the power to refer a Bill of the devolved legislature for decision. He appeared on the Reference which considered the competence of the National Assembly to pass a Bill providing for the recovery of medical costs from compensators in claims for asbestos injury in the way provided for in accident cases under the Social Security legislation. The insurers challenged the Assembly's legislative competence generally and for breach of ECHR Art 1 Protocol 1 because of the retroactive effect of the legislation upon liabilities under employer's liability insurance contracts entered into in some cases many years ago. The Supreme Court agreed 3-2 that the Assembly did not have competence to enact the Bill at all, as its provisions did not "relate to" the national health service in Wales (a devolved subject area), and that the recovery provisions did (in any event) offend against the insurers' accorded property rights. Powerful dissents from Lord Thomas CJ and Lady Hale held that the Assembly did have legislative competence generally in the area dealt with, but that Art 1 was indeed infringed by these provisions. The Bill accordingly fell. On the minority view it would likely have been possible to amend it in accordance with s114 of GOWA 2006 to make it Art 1 Protocol 1 complaint.

== Professional associations ==
Huckle was the Executive Committee Member for Wales of the Personal Injury Bar Association ("PIBA") for 20 years. He has been a member of the Association of Personal Injury Lawyers ("Apil" - holding the post of Secretary to the Wales section during 2008–11), Action Against Medical Accidents ("AvMA"), the Wales Personal Injury Lawyers' Association, the Human Rights Bar Association, the Wales Public Law & Human Rights Association, the Criminal Bar Association, and the Society of Labour Lawyers.

== Work outside the law ==
Huckle was Chair of Welsh Rowing 2019-23 and Home Nations Director of British Rowing during 2020. In 2025 he became President of the Llandaff Rowing Club and leads on Strategy and planning of the club's 80th Anniversary celebrations in 2026.

== Appointments ==
- Chair, Welsh Rowing 2019-23 (Board 2017-23)
- Board Member, British Rowing 2019-20
- Council Member, JUSTICE2022- (Board 2016–2022)
- Board Member, Advocate (Bar Pro Bono) 2020-24
- Visiting professor of law at King's College London 2016-
- Master of the Bench, Lincoln's Inn 2012-
- Counsel General for Wales - (2011-2016)
- Queen's Counsel 2011–2022, King's Counsel 2022-
- Member of the Bar Council - (1990-2007)
- Welsh Assembly Government Clinical Negligence Speedy Resolution Scheme Panel (2006-2008)
- National Assembly for Wales Civil Panel (2000-2006)
- Wales & Chester Circuit Junior 2005 (Cardiff Junior 2003–5)
- Serious Fraud Office Panel (1999-2004)
- Treasury Panel (1994-2004)
- Lecturer Member of the Bar Council Human Rights Education Team (1999-2000)

== Publications ==
Books and Practitioner reference works

- Butterworths Personal Injury Litigation Service (General Editor 2016–21)
- Munkman on Employer's Liability (Section Editor: Noise Induced Hearing Loss) LexisNexisButterworths (15th-17th edition,2019)
- Occupational Illness Litigation Sweet & Maxwell (Section Editor: HAVS/VWF editor) (2005–15)
- Future Loss in Practice: Periodical Payments & Lump Sums, LexisNexisButterworths (2007)
- Mutual Judicial Assistance and Economic Crime (Commonwealth Secretariat 1985)

Articles

- Great Expectations [2012] New Law Journal 319 (March)
- Baker v Quantum in the Supreme Court: Implications, PI Focus, July 2011
- A Fair Hearing? [2010] New Law Journal 1709 (December)
- Reasonably Practicable, Not Reasonable, PI Focus June 2009
- Fatal Accidents: Family ties, PILJ, September 2008
- Fatal Accidents – No Loss No Claim? PI Focus, May 2008
- Not listening or just not hearing? JPIL, March 2007
- The trouble with certainty, PILJ, October 2006
- Excitations in the Court of Appeal, PILJ, November 2005
- Good vibe, vibe, good vibrations! PI Focus, October 2005
- Highway Maintenance: Mechanical Jurisprudence, PILJ, September 2005
- The Not Very Noisy Sewing Machine? (with Professor Mark Lutman) Lawtel, 2004 and APIL's PIFocus, August 2004 and October 2004
- An alternative way of calculating Smith v Manchester awards – a suggested refinement JPIL 2001 335
- Reasonable Model or Loss of Chance, APIL, December 2003

Legal offices
Preceded by John Griffiths	Counsel General for Wales; 2011–2016	Succeeded by Mick Antoniw
