= 1993 South Glamorgan County Council election =

Local election in Wales

The sixth and last election to South Glamorgan County Council was held in May 1993. It was preceded by the 1989 election. Following local government re-organization the authority was abolished in 1996 and its powers transferred to two unitary authorities, Cardiff Council and the Vale of Glamorgan Borough Council. Elections for the two shadow authorities were held in 1995.

== Boundary changes ==
There were no boundary changes at this election.

== Candidates ==
Conservative and Labour candidates contested all seats. Most seats were also contested by the Liberal Democrats. There were a smaller number of Plaid Cymru and Green Party candidates and a few Independents.

== Outcome ==
Since the previous election two SDP councilors joined Labour. Labour retained control with a small number of seats changing hands.

This table summarises the result of the elections in all wards. 62 councillors were elected.

1993 South Glamorgan County Council: elected members
Party	Seats	Gains	Losses	Net gain/loss	Seats %	Votes %	Votes	+/−
Labour	40	1	3	-2				
Conservative	12	0	2	-2				
Liberal Democrats	8	3	0	+3				
Plaid Cymru	1	0	0	0				
Independent Labour	1	1	0	+1				

== Ward Results ==
=== Adamsdown ===
Adamsdown 1993
Party	Candidate	Votes	%	±%
Labour	Kenneth Hutchings*	1,141	60.8	
Liberal Democrats	John Dixon	578	30.8	
Conservative	K. Evans	111	5.9	
Communist	F. Rawling	47	2.5	
Majority				
Turnout			34.3	
Labour hold		Swing		

=== Baruc ===
Baruc 1993
Party	Candidate	Votes	%	±%
Conservative	J. Donovan*	724	34.7	
Plaid Cymru	Nic Hodges	626	30.0	
Labour	B. Sharp	610	29.3	
Liberal Democrats	S. O'Brien	124	6.0	
Majority				
Turnout			47.9	
Conservative hold		Swing		

=== Butetown ===
Butetown 1993
Party	Candidate	Votes	%	±%
Labour	Ben Foday	663	76.0	
Independent	Manuel Dossantos	112	12.8	
Conservative	F. Arnold	63	7.2	
Liberal Democrats	P. Doody	34	3.9	
Majority				
Turnout			52.7	
Labour hold		Swing		

=== Buttrills ===
Buttrills 1993
Party	Candidate	Votes	%	±%
Labour	B. Lane*	993	66.3	
Conservative	T. Sparks	297	19.8	
Liberal Democrats	D. Connell	137	9.1	
Plaid Cymru	G. Richards	71	4.7	
Majority				
Turnout			35.7	
Labour hold		Swing		

=== Cadoc ===
Cadoc 1993
Party	Candidate	Votes	%	±%
Labour	F. Johnson	905	68.9	
Conservative	C. Lambert	225	17.1	
Plaid Cymru	J. Lawrence	109	8.3	
Green	I. Gooderson	75	5.7	
Majority				
Turnout			62.7	
Labour hold		Swing		

=== Canton ===
Canton 1993
Party	Candidate	Votes	%	±%
Labour	D. Reed	1,044	55.2	
Conservative	A. Delamain	507	26.8	
Liberal Democrats	C. Warren	339	17.9	
Majority				
Turnout			39.9	
Labour hold		Swing		

=== Castleland ===
Castleland 1993
Party	Candidate	Votes	%	±%
Labour	M. Sharp*	798	77.9	
Conservative	S. Newman	181	17.7	
Plaid Cymru	A. Dearing	45	4.4	
Majority				
Turnout			36.3	
Labour hold		Swing		

=== Central ===
Central 1993
Party	Candidate	Votes	%	±%
Liberal Democrats	Robin Rowland	704	43.1	
Labour	C. Champion*	642	39.3	
Conservative	C. Baker	119	7.3	
Green	N. Clark	86	5.3	
Plaid Cymru	Terence O'Neill	83	5.1	
Majority		62		
Turnout			33.3	
Liberal Democrats gain from Labour		Swing		

=== Cornerswell ===
Labour had won the seat four years previously but lost it to the Conservatives at a subsequent by-election.

Cornerswell 1993
Party	Candidate	Votes	%	±%
Labour	A. Rees	1,200	50.7	
Conservative	J. Flanigan*	1,168	49.3	
Majority				
Turnout			40.4	
Labour hold		Swing		

=== Court ===
Court 1993
Party	Candidate	Votes	%	±%
Labour	S. Parsons*	866	75.8	
Conservative	C. Lambert	149	13.0	
Liberal Democrats	K. Bowden	56	4.9	
Plaid Cymru	R. Hughes	46	4.0	
Green	K. Simpson	26	2.3	
Majority				
Turnout			31.0	
Labour hold		Swing		

=== Cowbridge ===
Cowbridge 1993
Party	Candidate	Votes	%	±%
Conservative	R. Thomas*	1,247	47.4	
Labour	J. Baty	883	33.6	
Liberal Democrats	Peter Sain Ley Berry	325	12.4	
Plaid Cymru	H. Llewellyn-Morgan	174	6.6	
Majority				
Turnout			44.8	
Conservative hold		Swing		

=== Cyncoed Village ===
Cyncoed Village 1993
Party	Candidate	Votes	%	±%
Liberal Democrats	J. Holiday*	1,290	46.6	
Conservative	C. Baker	807	35.7	
Labour	C. Bonnett	161	7.1	
Majority				
Turnout			54.0	
Liberal Democrats hold		Swing		

=== Cyntwell ===
Cyntwell 1993
Party	Candidate	Votes	%	±%
Liberal Democrats	Roger Burley	593	45.9	
Labour	B. Phillips*	538	45.2	
Conservative	J. Courtis	58	4.9	
Majority				
Turnout			32.8	
Liberal Democrats gain from Labour		Swing		

=== Deri ===
Deri 1993
Party	Candidate	Votes	%	±%
Conservative	M. Davies*	862	47.2	
Labour	F. John	539	29.5	
Liberal Democrats	G. Hallett	347	19.0	
Green	G. Jones	79	4.3	
Majority				
Turnout			40.9	
Conservative hold		Swing		

=== Dinas Powys North ===
Dinas Powys North 1993
Party	Candidate	Votes	%	±%
Plaid Cymru	Chris Franks*	1,403	59.3	
Conservative	M. Pound	502	21.2	
Labour	J. Davies	366	15.5	
Liberal Democrats	B. Southwell	96	4.1	
Majority				
Turnout			48.3	
Plaid Cymru hold		Swing		

=== Dinas Powys South ===
Dinas Powys South 1993
Party	Candidate	Votes	%	±%
Conservative	A. Ernest	798	36.9	
Labour	R. Cox	636	29.4	
Plaid Cymru	David Haswell	493	22.8	
Liberal Democrats	C. Southwell	236	10.9	
Majority				
Turnout			39.4	
Conservative hold		Swing		

=== Dyfan ===
Dyfan 1993
Party	Candidate	Votes	%	±%
Labour	C. Watkins*	933	58.0	
Conservative	K. Wright	441	27.4	
Liberal Democrats	K. Matthews	191	11.9	
Plaid Cymru	M. Storm	45	2.8	
Majority				
Turnout			41.3	
Labour hold		Swing		

=== Eglwys Wen ===
Eglwys Wen 1993
Party	Candidate	Votes	%	±%
Labour	A. Fennessy*	1,498	51.3	
Conservative	D. Porter	894	30.6	
Liberal Democrats	G. Mellem	318	10.9	
Plaid Cymru	Harri Pritchard-Jones	211	7.2	
Majority				
Turnout			47.6	
Labour hold		Swing		

=== Fairwater ===
Fairwater 1993
Party	Candidate	Votes	%	±%
Labour	Derek Rees	1,034	61.0	
Conservative	R. Trigg	419	24.7	
Liberal Democrats	P. Gemson	241	14.2	
Majority				
Turnout			31.6	
Labour hold		Swing		

=== Gabalfa ===
Gabalfa 1993
Party	Candidate	Votes	%	±%
Labour	D. Campbell*	1,153	70.8	
Conservative	E. Morgan	250	15.4	
Liberal Democrats	Cathy Pearcy	225	13.8	
Majority				
Turnout			33.1	
Labour hold		Swing		

=== Gibbonsdown ===
Gibbonsdown 1993
Party	Candidate	Votes	%	±%
Labour	B. Murray*	1,084	82.1	
Conservative	W. Nunn	131	9.9	
Liberal Democrats	S. Bowden	61	4.6	
Plaid Cymru	O. Phillips	44	3.3	
Majority				
Turnout			34.0	
Labour hold		Swing		

=== Glan Ely ===
Glan Ely 1993
Party	Candidate	Votes	%	±%
Labour	Russell Goodway^{o}	1,082	78.4	
Conservative	N. Durbin	145	10.5	
Liberal Democrats	R. Hewlett	106	4.6	
BNP	A. Morgan	47	3.4	
Majority				
Turnout			25.2	
Labour hold		Swing		

=== Heath Park ===
Heath Park 1993
Party	Candidate	Votes	%	±%
Conservative	Tony John*	789	43.2	
Labour	M. Harries	594	32.5	
Liberal Democrats	W. Monkley	444	24.3	
Majority				
Turnout			34.4	
Conservative hold		Swing		

=== Highmead ===
Highmead 1993
Party	Candidate	Votes	%	±%
Labour	B. Finn	1,020	74.2	
Conservative	W. Clarke	216	15.7	
Liberal Democrats	H. Gemson	138	10.0	
Majority				
Turnout			25.8	
Labour hold		Swing		

=== Illtyd ===
Illtyd 1993
Party	Candidate	Votes	%	±%
Labour	Matthew Griffiths*	1,068	46.4	
Conservative	E. Williams	1,002	43.5	
Liberal Democrats	E. Maw	132	5.7	
Plaid Cymru	E. Rees	101	4.4	
Majority				
Turnout			70.4	
Labour gain from Conservative		Swing		

=== Lakeside ===
Lakeside 1993
Party	Candidate	Votes	%	±%
Liberal Democrats	T. Pickets	1,342	67.6	
Conservative	K. Fisher	496	23.4	
Labour	D. Owen	221	10.4	
Green	D. Corker	57	2.7	
Majority				
Turnout			47.1	
Liberal Democrats hold		Swing		

=== Landsdowne ===
Landsdowne 1993
Party	Candidate	Votes	%	±%
Labour	Cherry Short	1,199	67.6	
Conservative	C. Trigg	295	16.6	
Liberal Democrats	A. Burns	179	10.1	
Green	V. Turner	101	5.7	
Majority				
Turnout			30.8	
Labour hold		Swing		

=== Lisvane with St Mellons ===
Lisvane with St Mellons 1993
Party	Candidate	Votes	%	±%
Conservative	H. Campbell*	858	46.2	
Liberal Democrats	A. Holland	677	36.5	
Labour	S. Pantak	270	14.5	
Green	H. O'Connor	51	2.7	
Majority				
Turnout			39.5	
Conservative hold		Swing		

=== Llandaff ===
Llandaff 1993
Party	Candidate	Votes	%	±%
Conservative	Julius Hermer*	1,217	48.0	
Labour	J. Sheppard	763	30.1	
Liberal Democrats	E. Williams	299	11.8	
Plaid Cymru	Eluned Bush	164	6.5	
Green	F. James	93	3.7	
Majority				
Turnout			36.6	
Conservative hold		Swing		

=== Llandaff North ===
Llandaff North 1993
Party	Candidate	Votes	%	±%
Labour	A. A'Hearne*	1,554	72.3	
Conservative	J. Marshall	346	16.1	
Liberal Democrats	J. Reece	248	11.5	
Majority				
Turnout			35.6	
Labour hold		Swing		

=== Llanedeyrn ===
Vita Jones was elected as an SDP candidate in 1987 but subsequently rejoined the Labour Party.

Llanedeyrn 1993
Party	Candidate	Votes	%	±%
Labour	Vita Jones*	1,469	78.4	
Liberal Democrats	S. Wakefield	204	10.9	
Conservative	J. Munton	200	10.7	
Majority				
Turnout			28.8	
Labour hold		Swing		

=== Llanrumney North ===
Llanrumney North 1993
Party	Candidate	Votes	%	±%
Labour	B. Lawes*	1,005	84.6	
Conservative	A. Price	112	9.4	
Liberal Democrats	A. Khan	71	6.0	
Majority				
Turnout			26.4	
Labour hold		Swing		

=== Llanrumney South ===
Llanrumney South 1993
Party	Candidate	Votes	%	±%
Labour	D. Francis*	946	70.6	
Conservative	S. Woods	290	21.6	
Green	L. Davey	104	7.8	
Majority				
Turnout			29.8	
Labour hold		Swing		

=== Mackintosh ===
Mackintosh 1993
Party	Candidate	Votes	%	±%
Labour	Julie Morgan*	1,464	67.4	
Conservative	J. Evans	278	12.8	
Liberal Democrats	M. Morris	225	10.4	
Plaid Cymru	E. Parish	121	5.6	
Green	P. Ward	84	3.9	
Majority				
Turnout			37.7	
Labour hold		Swing		

=== Maindy ===
Maindy 1993
Party	Candidate	Votes	%	±%
Liberal Democrats	David Rees	1,106	46.4	
Labour	Reginald Surridge	966	40.5	
Conservative	E. Dibble	127	5.3	
Plaid Cymru	Fflur Roberts	93	3.9	
Green	D. Beasely	91	3.8	
Majority				
Turnout			41.7	
Liberal Democrats hold		Swing		

=== North Whitchurch with Tongwynlais ===
North Whitchurch with Tongwynlais 1993
Party	Candidate	Votes	%	±%
Labour	W. Salmon	1,502	52.2	
Conservative	W. Griffiths	1,165	40.5	
Liberal Democrats	P. Brightman	210	7.3	
Majority				
Turnout			51.2	
Labour hold		Swing		

=== Pantllacca ===
Labour had won the seat from the Liberal Democrats in a by-election

Pantllacca 1993
Party	Candidate	Votes	%	±%
Labour	Graham Hinchey*	762	52.7	
Liberal Democrats	G. Venning	462	32.0	
Conservative	J. Dickson	191	13.2	
Green	M. Duddy	31	2.1	
Majority				
Turnout			28.6	
Labour hold		Swing		

=== Pantmawr ===
Pantmawr 1993
Party	Candidate	Votes	%	±%
Conservative	Gareth Neale*	917	45.0	
Labour	S. Williams	652	32.0	
Liberal Democrats	J. Brent	338	16.6	
Plaid Cymru	F. Griffiths	131	6.4	
Majority				
Turnout			41.3	
Conservative hold		Swing		

=== Park ===
Park 1993
Party	Candidate	Votes	%	±%
Labour	Sue Lent*	1,218	60.6	
Liberal Democrats	D. Powell	328	16.3	
Conservative	R. Evans	259	12.9	
Plaid Cymru	D. Jones	122	6.1	
Green	C. Von Ruhland	84	4.2	
Majority				
Turnout			29.4	
Labour hold		Swing		

=== Pentre Bane ===
Pentre Bane 1993
Party	Candidate	Votes	%	±%
Labour	Caerwyn Roderick*	970	76.7	
Conservative	C. Davison-Sebry	167	13.2	
Liberal Democrats	C. Ceaton	127	10.0	
Majority				
Turnout			25.6	
Labour hold		Swing		

=== Penylan ===
Penylan 1993
Party	Candidate	Votes	%	±%
Liberal Democrats	R. Michaelis	1,192	57.7	
Conservative	G. Hughes*	575	27.8	
Labour	W. Matthews	300	14.5	
Majority				
Turnout			41.3	
Liberal Democrats gain from Conservative		Swing		

=== Plymouth ===
Plymouth 1993
Party	Candidate	Votes	%	±%
Conservative	D. Turner*	977	57.0	
Labour	P. McGarrigle	495	28.9	
Plaid Cymru	M. Harries	131	7.6	
Green	K. Hooper	112	6.5	
Majority				
Turnout			40.3	
Conservative hold		Swing		

=== Pontcanna ===
Pontcanna 1993
Party	Candidate	Votes	%	±%
Labour	R. Pearson	892	55.7	
Conservative	W. Donaldson	282	17.6	
Plaid Cymru	Penni Bestic	171	10.7	
Liberal Democrats	K. Blackburn	145	9.1	
Green	R. Wood	111	6.9	
Majority				
Turnout			32.4	
Labour hold		Swing		

=== Radyr with St Fagans ===
Marion Drake, elected as an SDP candidate in 1987, subsequently joined Labour.

Radyr with St Fagans 1993
Party	Candidate	Votes	%	±%
Labour	Marian Drake*	1,158	59.1	
Conservative	P. Davison-Sebry	645	32.9	
Liberal Democrats	N. Roberts	157	8.0	
Majority				
Turnout			49.4	
Labour hold		Swing		

=== Rhoose with Llancarfan ===
Rhoose with Llancarfan 1993
Party	Candidate	Votes	%	±%
Conservative	H. James*	1,009	61.8	
Labour	B. Goodway	625	38.2	
Majority				
Turnout			42.5	
Conservative hold		Swing		

=== Riverside South ===
Riverside South 1993
Party	Candidate	Votes	%	±%
Labour	J. Singh	886	71.6	
Liberal Democrats	K. Hammacott	124	10.0	
Conservative	A. Walker	124	10.0	
Plaid Cymru	P. Daley	103	8.3	
Majority				
Turnout			27.5	
Labour hold		Swing		

=== Rumney ===
Rumney 1993
Party	Candidate	Votes	%	±%
Labour	M. Payne*	1,484	67.0	
Conservative	S. Whiting	597	27.0	
Plaid Cymru	D. Reeves	133	6.0	
Majority				
Turnout			32.8	
Labour hold		Swing		

=== Saltmead ===
Saltmead 1993
Party	Candidate	Votes	%	±%
Labour	D. Richards*	1,116	68.6	
Conservative	W. Selwood	274	16.8	
Plaid Cymru	D. Williams	146	9.0	
Liberal Democrats	M. Verma	91	5.6	
Majority				
Turnout			31.7	
Labour hold		Swing		

=== Splott ===
Splott 1993
Party	Candidate	Votes	%	±%
Independent Labour	M. Cook	1,181	54.1	
Labour	John Brooks*	765	35.1	
Conservative	A. McCarthy	122	5.6	
Liberal Democrats	K. Chubb	83	3.8	
Communist	D. Macaskill	31	1.4	
Majority			19.0	
Turnout			43.2	
Independent Labour gain from Labour		Swing		

=== St Athan with Boverton ===
St Athan with Boverton 1993
Party	Candidate	Votes	%	±%
Labour	B. Doughty*	1,063	56.5	
Conservative	T. Crowther	613	32.6	
Liberal Democrats	B. Van Rooyen	126	6.7	
Plaid Cymru	S. Stephens	78	4.1	
Majority				
Turnout			38.9	
Labour hold		Swing		

=== St Augustines ===
St Augustines 1993
Party	Candidate	Votes	%	±%
Labour	P. Gray*	852	54.9	
Conservative	B. Chapple	431	27.8	
Plaid Cymru	D. Harries	179	6.7	
Green	P. Kinnersley	91	5.9	
Majority				
Turnout			36.3	
Labour hold		Swing		

=== Stanwell ===
Stanwell 1993
Party	Candidate	Votes	%	±%
Labour	H. Rees	660	57.1	
Conservative	A. Williams	402	34.8	
Plaid Cymru	S. Fford	93	8.1	
Majority				
Turnout			36.6	
Labour hold		Swing		

=== The Marl ===
The Marl 1993
Party	Candidate	Votes	%	±%
Labour	Peter Perkins*	861	74.4	
Conservative	J. Summerhayes	213	18.4	
Liberal Democrats	R. Pye	51	4.4	
Plaid Cymru	Emyr Phillips	33	2.8	
Majority				
Turnout			27.8	
Labour hold		Swing		

=== Thornhill ===
Thornhill 1993
Party	Candidate	Votes	%	±%
Labour	Nicholas Butler*	1,791	58.4	
Conservative	M. Voisey	755	24.6	
Liberal Democrats	V. Hallet	520	17.0	
Majority				
Turnout			42.2	
Labour hold		Swing		

=== Ton-yr-Ywen ===
Ton-yr-Ywen 1993
Party	Candidate	Votes	%	±%
Conservative	B. Rees*	644	39.4	
Labour	P. Owen	584	35.7	
Liberal Democrats	J. James	313	19.1	
Green	M. Evans	94	5.7	
Majority				
Turnout			39.7	
Conservative hold		Swing		

=== Trelai ===
Trelai 1993
Party	Candidate	Votes	%	±%
Liberal Democrats	Jacqui Gasson*	903	59.3	
Labour	Julie Mawn	621	40.7	
Majority				
Turnout			39.9	
Liberal Democrats hold		Swing		

=== Tremorfa ===
Tremorfa 1993
Party	Candidate	Votes	%	±%
Labour	Gordon Houlston*	869	78.0	
Plaid Cymru	A. O'Neill	142	12.7	
Conservative	J. McCarthy	79	7.1	
Liberal Democrats	J. Febbo	24	2.2	
Majority				
Turnout			38.4	
Labour hold		Swing		

=== Trowbridge ===
Trowbridge 1993
Party	Candidate	Votes	%	±%
Labour	W. Bowen*	1,531	74.3	
Conservative	R. Price	337	16.4	
Liberal Democrats	S. Sinha	120	5.8	
Plaid Cymru	S. Parry	73	3.5	
Majority				
Turnout			22.9	
Labour hold		Swing		

=== Ty Glas ===
Ty Glas 1993
Party	Candidate	Votes	%	±%
Labour	Christopher Bettinson	931	50.4	
Conservative	P. Tatham	662	35.9	
Liberal Democrats	D. Wright	253	13.7	
Majority				
Turnout			49.8	
Labour hold		Swing		

=== Vale of Glamorgan North East ===
Vale of Glamorgan North East 1993
Party	Candidate	Votes	%	±%
Conservative	M. Prior*	749	50.5	
Labour	J. Evans	331	22.3	
Liberal Democrats	S. Campbell	287	19.3	
Plaid Cymru	N. Williams	117	7.9	
Majority				
Turnout			40.7	
Conservative hold		Swing		

=== Vale of Glamorgan South West ===
Vale of Glamorgan South West 1993
Party	Candidate	Votes	%	±%
Labour	L. Hughes*	1,451	67.3	
Conservative	E. Bryant	504	23.4	
Plaid Cymru	M. Gill	79	3.7	
Liberal Democrats	D. Van Rooyen	79	3.7	
Green	A. Markey	42	1.9	
Majority				
Turnout			46.0	
Labour hold		Swing		

=== Waterloo ===
Waterloo 1993
Party	Candidate	Votes	%	±%
Liberal Democrats	L. Kelloway*	1,392	62.3	
Labour	R. Rees	412	18.4	
Conservative	A. Baker	329	14.7	
Plaid Cymru	Huw Marshall	102	4.6	
Majority				
Turnout			47.1	
Liberal Democrats hold		Swing		

KEY

* existing councillor, for the same ward
^{o} existing councillor, but for a different ward
