= John Leonard, Baron Leonard =

British Labour Party politician

John Denis Leonard, Baron Leonard, OBE (19 October 1909 – 17 July 1983) was a British Labour Party politician.

Leonard was born in Manorhamilton, Ireland, the son of an Irish journalist. He emigrated to the United Kingdom in 1939 and set up an engineering firm in Cardiff. He was elected to the Cardiff City Council in 1970 and the South Glamorgan County Council in 1974, serving as its chairman between 1976 and 1977. He was appointed an OBE in 1976.

On 2 May 1978, Leonard was made a life peer, as Baron Leonard, of the City of Cardiff in the County of South Glamorgan. He served as a Lord in Waiting between 1978 and 1979. He was selected as High Sheriff of South Glamorgan for 1979, but was excused from serving upon his elevation to the peerage.
