= Harri Pritchard-Jones =

Welsh-language writer (1933–2015)

Harri Elwyn Pritchard-Jones (3 October 1933 – 10 March 2015) was an English-born Welsh language author, critic, and psychiatrist.

Pritchard-Jones was born in Dudley, Worcestershire (now West Midlands), but brought up and educated in Anglesey. He studied at Trinity College, Dublin, before working as a doctor and psychiatrist in the Cardiff area. He published his first Welsh book, Troeon, in 1966, and during his life published 15 collections of poetry, short stories, and criticism, as well as novels, translations, and TV scripts. His work was itself translated into several languages. He won awards from the National Eisteddfod and the Arts Council, and was a Fellow of the Welsh Academy (Yr Academi Gymreig), an organisation of which he was chairman between 1991 and 1996.

Pritchard-Jones was an active member of Plaid Cymru and unsuccessfully fought a number of local elections for the party in the Cardiff area. His last campaign was for the Eglwys Wen ward at the 1993 elections to South Glamorgan County Council when he finished fourth polling 211 votes.

== Personal life ==
Pritchard-Jones married Lenna Harries. Their children are the journalists Nia and Guto Harri and Illtud Harri .

== Death ==
Harri Pritchard-Jones died at the Marie Curie Hospital in Penarth, at the age of 81.
