= South Glamorgan County Council =

Welsh local governing body (1974–1996)

South Glamorgan County Council Cyngor Sir De Morgannwg

History
- Founded: 1 April 1974
- Disbanded: 31 March 1996
- Preceded by: Cardiff County Borough Council
- Succeeded by: Cardiff; Vale of Glamorgan

Elections
- First election: April 1973
- Last election: May 1993
- Next election: N/A

South Glamorgan County Council (Welsh: Cyngor Sir De Morgannwg) was the local government authority that administered the county of South Glamorgan, Wales from its creation in 1974 until its abolition in 1996.

== History ==
Local government in England and Wales was reorganised in 1974 under the Local Government Act 1972. The old administrative county of Glamorgan was divided into three new counties and Glamorgan County Council was abolished. The new county of South Glamorgan was created covering the former county borough of Cardiff, (which had been independent from Glamorgan County Council), together with the southern parts of Glamorgan and the parish of St Mellons from Monmouthshire. South Glamorgan County Council came into existence on 1 April 1974. There were two lower-tier district councils within South Glamorgan: Cardiff City Council (later Cardiff Council) and the Vale of Glamorgan Borough Council (later the Vale of Glamorgan Council).

Ahead of the 1970 general election, the Labour Party, had proposed splitting Glamorgan into two counties, East and West. However, the Conservative Party prevailed at the election and proceeded to divide the county into three, hoping South Glamorgan would become a Conservative-controlled administration.

South Glamorgan County Council was abolished in 1996 under the Local Government (Wales) Act 1994. Its functions passed to the two district councils of Cardiff and the Vale of Glamorgan, which became unitary authorities.

== Political control ==
The first election to the county council was held in 1973, initially operating as a shadow authority alongside the outgoing authorities until it came into its powers on 1 April 1974. Despite the intentions of the Conservatives who created South Glamorgan, the Labour Party gained a majority of the seats on the council at the first election. Labour held the council from 1974 to 1977 and from 1981 to 1996, with the Conservatives holding power for the four intervening years.

Party in control	Years
Labour	1974–1977
Conservative	1977–1981
Labour	1981–1996

=== Leadership ===
The leaders of the council included:

Councillor	Party	From	To
Jack Brooks	Labour	1974	1977
Hugh Ferguson Jones	Conservative	1977	15 Jun 1979
Bob Morgan	Labour	1981	May 1986
Jack Brooks	Labour	May 1986	May 1992
Russell Goodway	Labour	May 1992	31 Mar 1996

Emyr Currie-Jones was the initial Chairman of the Council from 1973 until 1975.

== Elections ==
Elections were held every four years:

Year	Seats	Labour	Conservative	Liberal Democrats (Note: Includes Liberals and SDP pre-1988)	Plaid Cymru	Others	Notes
1973	80	42	36	0	0	2	
1977	80	15	64	0	0	1	
1981	80	41	35	3	1	0	
1985	62	34	18	9	1	0	New division boundaries.
1989	62	40	13	6	1	2	
1993	62	40	12	8	1	1	

== Premises ==
The county council was initially headquartered in a building on Newport Road, Cardiff. In 1986 the council moved to a purpose-built County Hall at Atlantic Wharf in Cardiff. Since the county council's abolition in 1996, County Hall has been used as offices by Cardiff Council.

== See also ==
- Category:Members of South Glamorgan County Council

== Sources ==
- Alan Hooper; John Punter (Eds.) Capital Cardiff 1975–2020: Regeneration, Competitiveness and the Urban Environment. University of Wales Press (2006), ISBN 0-7083-2063-5.
