= Emyr Currie-Jones =

Welsh politician

Emyr Currie-Jones CBE (1917–2008) was a local Labour Party politician in Cardiff, Wales. He was Chairman of South Glamorgan County Council and known for his role in introducing Welsh-language education in Cardiff. He has been described as "an outstanding example of a local councillor who steered Welsh-medium education through many a political storm."

== Background ==
Currie-Jones was born on 17 January 1917 in Caernarfon, North Wales, to Grace Currie and Lewis Jones. He was a fluent Welsh-speaker and went to the Caernarvon County School before graduating from University College, Aberystwyth, where he shared accommodation with Emyr Humphreys. Currie-Jones subsequently became a solicitor in Cardiff. He married Mary Catherine Jones.

== Legal career ==
Currie-Jones became a solicitor in Cardiff and was prosecuting solicitor for the Cardiff City Council from 1950 to 1955. He became a partner in the legal firm, Rees, Currie-Jones, Davies and Evans, based in Castle Arcade and was also president of the Cardiff and District Law Society. He retired from the legal practice in 1987.

== Politics and public service ==
Currie-Jones was elected as a Labour councillor on Cardiff City Council in 1966, becoming Chairman of the Education Committee, subsequently losing his council seat but being re-elected in 1971 for the Cathays ward. Upon the creation of South Glamorgan, Currie-Jones became the first Chairman of South Glamorgan County Council, from 1973 to 1975. He represented the Cathays ward from 1973 to 1977, losing his seat at the 1977 election. He was re-elected to the Council for the Ely and Trelai wards from 1981 to 1989.

As Chairman of the Education Committee on Cardiff City Council he successfully laid the foundation for Cardiff's first Welsh-medium school, Glantaff High School. Against strong opposition to the idea, he persuaded the National Union of Teachers (NUT) and the Conservative spokesman on the Welsh language, to back him.

He was awarded a CBE in the 1976 New Year Honours for social and local government services in South Wales.

Currie-Jones was also a member of the Welsh Joint Education Committee, the Council of the University College of Cardiff and Welsh Language Council. He was honorary President of the National Eisteddfod of Wales when came to Cardiff in 2008, also Chairman of the organising committee.

Currie-Jones died on 13 October 2008, aged 91.
