= Bob Morgan (priest) =

Welsh vicar and politician (1928–2011)

Bob Morgan OBE
- Born: Robert Harman Morgan; 28 October 1928
- Died: 23 November 2011 (aged 83); Swansea, Wales
- Education: University College, Cardiff
- Political party: Labour
- Children: Eluned

Robert Harman Morgan OBE (28 October 1928 – 23 November 2011) was a vicar of the Church in Wales and Labour Party politician who became leader of South Glamorgan County Council. He was the father of Welsh first minister Eluned Morgan.

== Early life and education ==
Morgan was born on 28 October 1928 and grew up in Tremorfa, Cardiff, until the Second World War forced his family to evacuate to Aberdare where he went to the local grammar school. After the war he returned to Cardiff and, after spending National Service in the RAF, got a job as an insurance clerk. With ambitions to become a social worker he took two A-levels in six months, before graduating in Politics and Economics at University College, Cardiff. He went on to the theological college at Mirfield in Yorkshire before being ordained in 1957 to a curacy at St Augustine's Church, Penarth where he served until 1961. He married his wife, Elaine, in 1963.

== Career ==
In 1961 Morgan became curate on the large Cardiff housing estate of Ely. He became vicar of the Ely parish (which had been formed by the Mirfield Community of the Resurrection) in 1967. He raised £10,000 to repair the Church of the Resurrection and established himself as a central figure in the area. The Church of the Resurrection became a community centre and refuge for the locals. It held a weekly disco in the church hall.

In 1974, after being encouraged by a church warden to enter into politics, Morgan was elected to Cardiff City Council and South Glamorgan County Council for the Ely ward. In 1977 he became leader of Labour group on South Glamorgan Council and subsequently leader of the council when Labour regained control in 1982. He led the regeneration of Cardiff's impoverished ex-industrial areas. He was replaced by Jack Brooks as leader in 1989, and became chairman of the council in 1992, before retiring from politics the following year.

Morgan was awarded the Order of the British Empire (OBE) in the 1994 New Years Honours, for "services to the community in South Glamorgan". He became an honorary canon of Llandaff Cathedral in the same year.

== Retirement and death ==
Morgan retired to live in St Davids, Pembrokeshire. He died on 23 November 2011 at Morriston Hospital, Swansea. In tribute, former First Minister of Wales Rhodri Morgan said "He was a massive figure in Ely and South Glamorgan politics, and he married religion and politics remarkably effectively in that he never saw any distinction between being a very committed Christian vicar of a very deprived parish... and being a leader and member of the Labour group on South Glamorgan county council." In 2016 a memorial glass screen was unveiled at the Church of Resurrection, with lines from the Magnificat in English and Welsh.
