= John Brooks, Baron Brooks of Tremorfa =

British peer (1927–2016)

The Right Honourable The Lord Brooks of Tremorfa DL
- Brooks in 1968

Member of the House of Lords
- Lord Temporal
- Life peerage 17 July 1979 – 4 March 2016

Personal details
- Born: 12 April 1927
- Died: 4 March 2016 (aged 88)

John Edward "Jack" Brooks, Baron Brooks of Tremorfa DL (12 April 1927 – 4 March 2016) was a Welsh politician and boxing functionary.

== Early life ==
The son of Edward George Brooks and Rachel White, he was born in 1927 and educated at Coleg Harlech.

== Career ==
Between 1966 and 1984, Brooks was Secretary of the Labour party for Cardiff South-East constituency. In the February 1974 and October 1974 general election, he contested Barry for Labour.

Brooks was an elected Cardiff councillor for the Splott ward. He became leader of South Glamorgan County Council (SGCC), known for his "strong leadership style" and his effective control of the Labour Party group during the 1980s. When he replaced Reverend Bob Morgan as leader it was described as a 'coup', with Brooks deciding a tougher leadership was required. Brooks was widely seen as being enormously influential on the future leader of SGCC and Cardiff Council, Russell Goodway.

In the 1979 Dissolution Honours, he became a life peer as Baron Brooks of Tremorfa, of Tremorfa in the County of Glamorgan. After many years acting as agent to former prime minister Jim Callaghan. He further received an Honorary Fellowship of the University of Wales Institute, Cardiff (UWIC). As Deputy Chairman of the Cardiff Bay Development Corporation (and representative for the Council), he was pivotally instrumental in the redevelopment of the Docks area of Cardiff now known worldwide as Cardiff Bay.

Having been vice-chairman of the British Boxing Board of Control between 1999 and 2000, he was its steward since 1986 and its president since 2004. After the former boxer Michael Watson won a negligence case against the BBBoC in 2001, the board had to sell its London headquarters to raise £400,000 to pay compensation. To avoid bankruptcy the board had to reduce its overheads and Brooks was instrumental in moving the board's head office to Cardiff. Brooks was a former chairman of the Welsh Sports Hall of Fame from 1988 and Sportsmatch Wales from 1992. In 1994, he was made a Deputy Lieutenant of South Glamorgan.

== Personal life ==
Brooks married in 1948 to Zetta Fussell and was divorced in 1956. They had two daughters and one son. In 1958, he married Margaret Pringle, with whom he had two sons by his second wife. Lord Brooks died on 4 March 2016 at the age of 88.
