= List of elections in 1966 =

The following elections occurred in 1966.

- 1966 Costa Rican general election
- 1966 Fianna Fáil leadership election
- 1966 Finnish parliamentary election
- 1966 Gambian general election
- 1966 Guatemalan general election
- 1966 Maltese general election
- 1966 Salvadoran legislative election

== Africa ==
- Kenyan parliamentary by-elections
- Mauritanian presidential election
- South African general election

== Asia ==
- Cambodian general election
- Indian Rajya Sabha elections
- Mongolian legislative election
- Singaporean by-elections
- South Vietnamese Constitutional Assembly election
- Soviet Union legislative election
- Turkish Senate election
- 1966 Turkish presidential election
- 1966 Taiwan presidential election

== Australia ==
- 1966 Australian federal election
- Kooyong by-election
- Dawson by-election
- Queensland state election

== Europe ==
- Albanian parliamentary election
- Bulgarian parliamentary election
- Danish general election
- Danish regional elections
- Danish local elections
- Faroese general election
- Fianna Fáil leadership election
- 1966 Irish presidential election
- Liechtenstein general election
- Liechtenstein local elections
- 1966 Soviet Union legislative election
- 1966 Swiss referendum
- 1966 Turkish presidential election
- United Kingdom general election

=== Austria ===
- 1966 Austrian legislative election

=== Germany ===
- 1966 Hamburg state election
- 1966 North Rhine-Westphalia state election (de)
- 1966 Hesse state election (de)
- 1966 Bavarian state election (de)

=== United Kingdom ===
- 1966 United Kingdom general election
  - England: 1966 United Kingdom general election in England
  - Scotland: 1966 United Kingdom general election in Scotland
  - Wales: 1966 United Kingdom general election in Wales
  - Northern Ireland: 1966 United Kingdom general election in Northern Ireland
  - List of MPs elected in the 1966 United Kingdom general election
- 1966 Carmarthen by-election
- 1966 Kingston upon Hull North by-election
- 1966 United Kingdom local elections

== North America ==
=== Canada ===
- 1966 British Columbia general election
- 1966 Edmonton municipal election
- 1966 Manitoba general election
- 1966 Newfoundland general election
- 1966 Ottawa municipal election
- 1966 Prince Edward Island general election
- 1966 Quebec general election
- 1966 Toronto municipal election

=== Caribbean ===
- 1966 Barbadian general election
- Dominican Republic general election
- Montserratian general election
- Saint Kitts-Nevis-Anguilla general election
- 1966 Trinidad and Tobago general election
- Saint Vincent and the Grenadines: general election

=== United States ===
- 1966 United States elections

==== United States lieutenant gubernatorial ====
- 1966 Alabama lieutenant gubernatorial election
- 1966 California lieutenant gubernatorial election
- 1966 Georgia lieutenant gubernatorial election
- 1966 Minnesota lieutenant gubernatorial election
- 1966 Nebraska lieutenant gubernatorial election
- 1966 Ohio lieutenant gubernatorial election
- 1966 Wisconsin lieutenant gubernatorial election

==== United States gubernatorial ====
- 1966 Alabama gubernatorial election
- 1966 Alaska gubernatorial election
- 1966 Arizona gubernatorial election
- 1966 Arkansas gubernatorial election
- 1966 California gubernatorial election
- 1966 Colorado gubernatorial election
- 1966 Connecticut gubernatorial election
- 1966 Florida gubernatorial election
- 1966 Georgia gubernatorial election
- 1966 Hawaii gubernatorial election
- 1966 Idaho gubernatorial election
- 1966 Iowa gubernatorial election
- 1966 Kansas gubernatorial election
- 1966 Maine gubernatorial election
- 1966 Maryland gubernatorial election
- 1966 Massachusetts gubernatorial election
- 1966 Michigan gubernatorial election
- 1966 Minnesota gubernatorial election
- 1966 Nebraska gubernatorial election
- 1966 Nevada gubernatorial election
- 1966 New Hampshire gubernatorial election
- 1966 New Mexico gubernatorial election
- 1966 New York gubernatorial election
- 1966 Ohio gubernatorial election
- 1966 Oklahoma gubernatorial election
- 1966 Oregon gubernatorial election
- 1966 Pennsylvania gubernatorial election
- 1966 Rhode Island gubernatorial election
- 1966 South Carolina gubernatorial election
- 1966 South Dakota gubernatorial election
- 1966 Tennessee gubernatorial election
- 1966 Texas gubernatorial election
- 1966 United States gubernatorial elections
- 1966 Vermont gubernatorial election
- 1966 Wisconsin gubernatorial election
- 1966 Wyoming gubernatorial election

==== United States House of Representatives ====
- 1966 United States House of Representatives elections

==== United States Senate ====
- 1966 United States Senate elections
- 1966 United States Senate election in Alabama
- 1966 United States Senate election in Alaska
- 1966 United States Senate election in Arkansas
- 1966 United States Senate election in Colorado
- 1966 United States Senate election in Delaware
- 1966 United States Senate election in Georgia
- 1966 United States Senate election in Idaho
- 1966 United States Senate election in Illinois
- 1966 United States Senate election in Iowa
- 1966 United States Senate election in Kansas
- 1966 United States Senate election in Kentucky
- 1966 United States Senate election in Louisiana
- 1966 United States Senate election in Maine
- 1966 United States Senate election in Massachusetts
- 1966 United States Senate elections in Michigan
- 1966 United States Senate election in Minnesota
- 1966 United States Senate election in Mississippi
- 1966 United States Senate election in Montana
- 1966 United States Senate election in Nebraska
- 1966 United States Senate election in New Hampshire
- 1966 United States Senate election in New Jersey
- 1966 United States Senate election in New Mexico
- 1966 United States Senate election in North Carolina
- 1966 United States Senate election in Oklahoma
- 1966 United States Senate election in Oregon
- 1966 United States Senate election in Rhode Island
- 1966 United States Senate election in South Carolina
- 1966 United States Senate special election in South Carolina
- 1966 United States Senate election in South Dakota
- 1966 United States Senate election in Tennessee
- 1966 United States Senate election in Texas
- 1966 United States Senate election in Virginia
- 1966 United States Senate special election in Virginia
- 1966 United States Senate election in West Virginia
- 1966 United States Senate election in Wyoming

== South America ==
- Bolivian general election
- Brazilian legislative election
- Brazilian presidential election
- Colombian parliamentary election
- Colombian presidential election
- Ecuadorian Constitutional Assembly election
- Uruguayan general election
- Uruguayan constitutional referendum

== Oceania ==
- 1966 Fijian general election
- 1966 New Zealand general election

== See also ==
- List of state leaders in 1966
