= 1966 United Kingdom local elections =

Elections in the United Kingdom

The 1966 United Kingdom local elections took place in 1966.

== England ==
- Altrincham
- Stretford
- Hale
- Leeds
- Liverpool
- Manchester
- Sale
- Salford
- Sheffield

== Scotland ==
- Aberdeen
- Dundee
- Edinburgh
- Glasgow

== Wales ==
- Cardiff

== See also ==
- 1966 in the United Kingdom
- 1966 United Kingdom general election
