= October 1966 =

Month of 1966

<<	October 1966					>>
Su	Mo	Tu	We	Th	Fr	Sa
						1
2	3	4	5	6	7	8
9	10	11	12	13	14	15
16	17	18	19	20	21	22
23	24	25	26	27	28	29
30	31

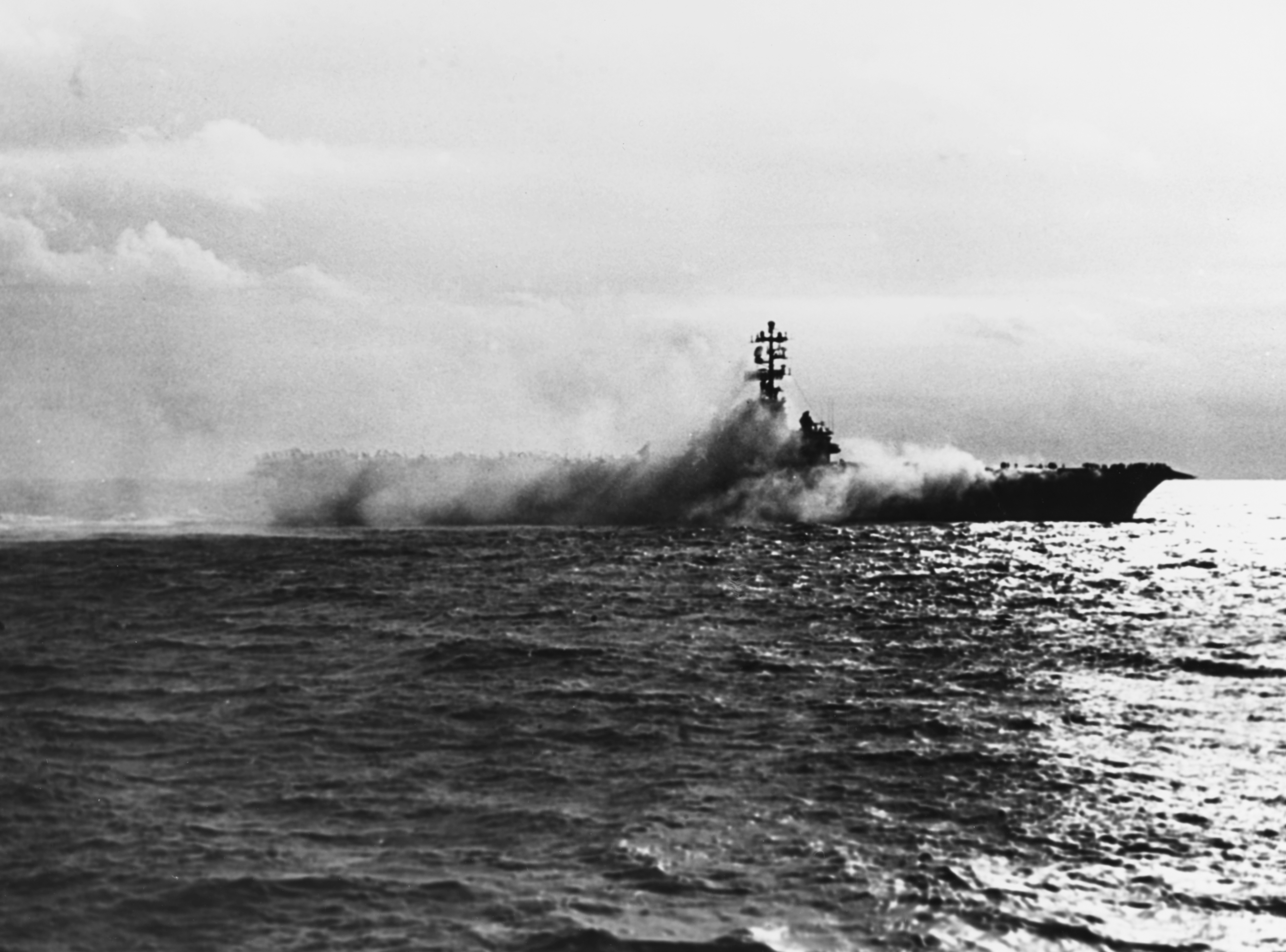
October 26, 1966: 44 crew of USS Oriskany killed in ship fire

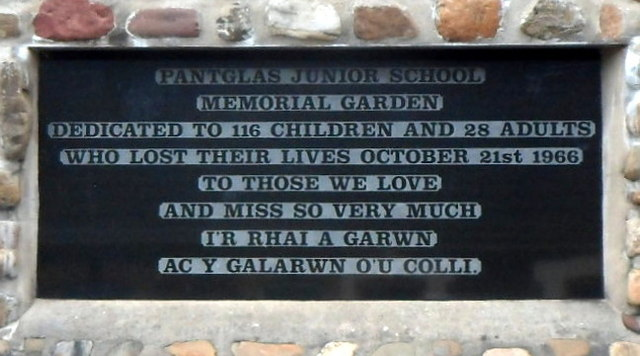
October 21, 1966: 116 schoolchildren in Wales killed in landslide

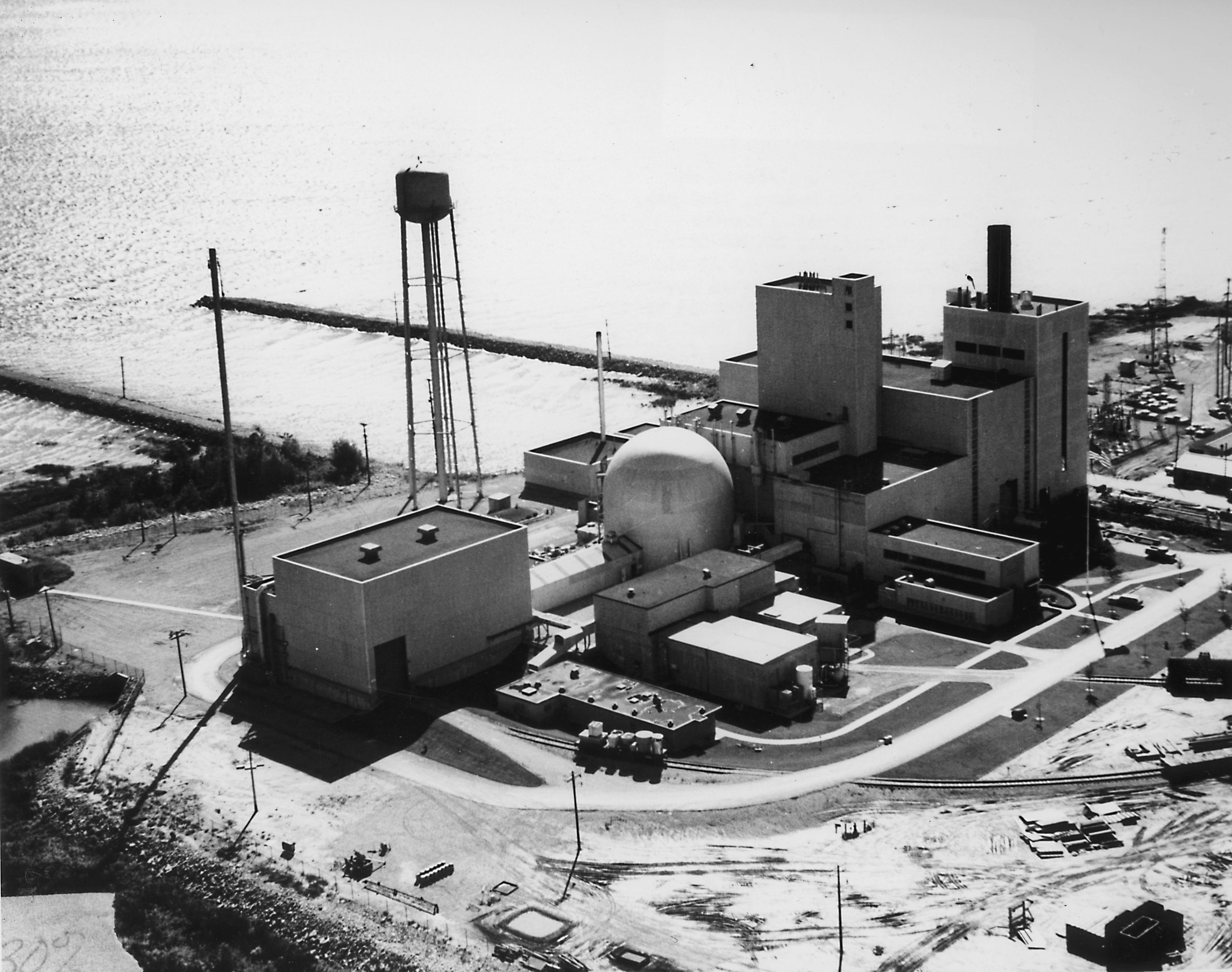
October 5, 1966: "We Almost Lost Detroit"

The following events occurred in October 1966:

== October 1, 1966 (Saturday) ==
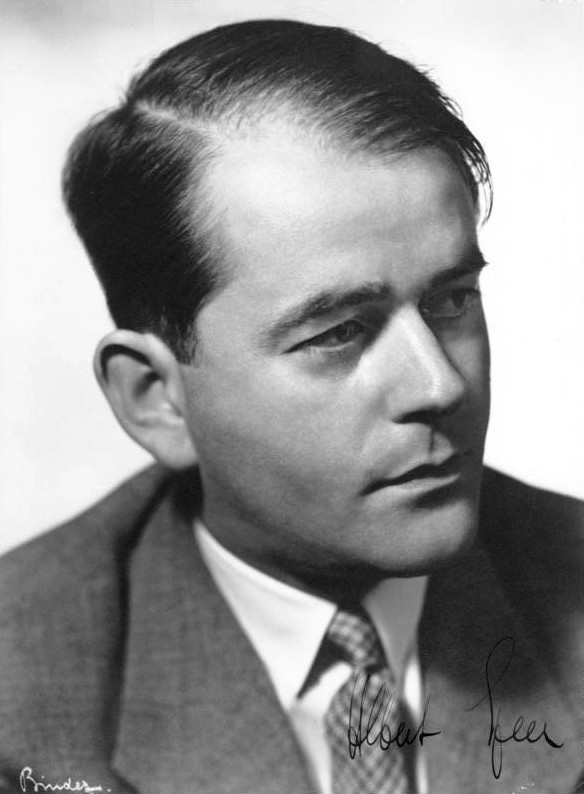
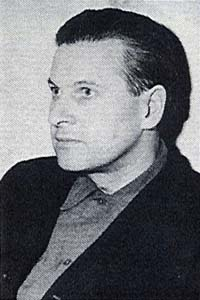
Albert Speer and Baldur von Schirach
- Former Nazi leaders Albert Speer and Baldur von Schirach were released from Spandau Prison in Berlin, shortly after midnight, after 20 years of incarceration for war crimes. The Soviet Union vetoed the release of the last remaining prisoner in Spandau, former Deputy Führer Rudolf Hess.
- West Coast Airlines Flight 956, a DC-9 jet, crashed 5.5 miles (8.9 km) south of Wemme, Oregon, United States, while flying the last leg of its flight from San Francisco to Portland, through a heavy rainstorm. All 18 people on board were killed. The accident marked the first loss of a DC-9.
- Born: George Weah, Liberian soccer player and winner of FIFA World Player of the Year award in 1995; in Monrovia
- Died: "Trigger Mike" Coppola, 66, New York mobster; from nephritis

== October 2, 1966 (Sunday) ==
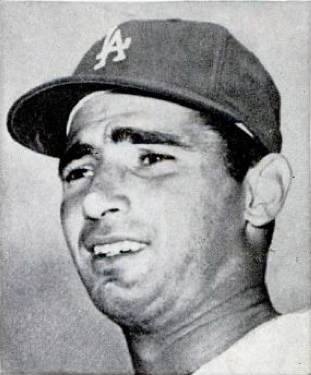
Koufax

- The 1966 Major League Baseball regular season came to a close as Sandy Koufax pitched the Los Angeles Dodgers to a 6–3 win over the Philadelphia Phillies to clinch the National League pennant and the right to face the Baltimore Orioles in the World Series. In the American League, the perennial pennant-winners, the New York Yankees, finished in last place for the first time since 1913. With 70 wins and 89 losses, they were half a game behind the Boston Red Sox, and 26 1/2 games out of first place, despite a 2–0 win over the Chicago White Sox on the last day.
- Forty-three refugees from Cuba, along with a crew member, drowned after waves caused by the 125-mile-per-hour (201 km/h) winds of Hurricane Inez swamped the twin-engine cruiser operated by Enrique "El Falco" Gonzalez. The craft broke apart in shark-infested waters while bringing the passengers to Florida. Gonzalez and one refugee, Jorge Garcia, clung to a raft for four days before being rescued by a freighter, but Garcia died shortly after being flown to a hospital at Homestead. Relatives of the victims had paid Gonzalez $1,000 apiece for each refugee for the chance to escape Cuba, and Gonzalez and first mate Enrique Oliva had departed while the hurricane was still in progress, risking the safety of their passengers because the Cuban patrol boats were tied up by the storm as well. Of ten people who were able to make it into a life raft, eight were swept off it by powerful waves.
- Two young women in the U.S. state of Florida, Nancy Elaine Leichner, 21, and Pamela Ann Nater, 20, hiking through the Alexander Springs Wilderness recreation area of the Ocala National Forest while their friends were skin diving, were kidnapped and then found dead, the apparent victims of drowning. They were the first victims of serial killer Gerard John Schaefer, who would confess to their murders. In all, Schaefer would be suspected of 28 murders, mostly of young women, between 1966 and his arrest in 1972.
- The first in a series of four plays in the Theatre 625 anthology strand, titled "Talking to a Stranger", was broadcast on BBC2 in the UK. Hailed by critics as one of the most important television dramas of the 1960s, it would go on to be placed seventy-eighth in a 2000 poll of industry professionals conducted by the British Film Institute to determine the 100 Greatest British Television Programmes of the 20th century.
- The Soviet military newspaper Red Star published an article that officially confirmed suspicions that military advisers from the USSR were aiding the North Vietnamese. According to the article, rocket specialists had been sent to train the Vietnamese on how to fire surface-to-air anti-aircraft missiles and had been forced to dodge bombing runs made by the United States.
- The once-thriving U.S. town of Quandahl, Iowa, located in Allamakee County, was sold at a public auction for $15,300. Founded by immigrants from Norway in the 19th century, the unincorporated village had had a bank, post office, dry goods and hardware stores, a grocery store and other businesses only 30 years earlier before a steady decline in the economy.
- Jim Clark won the 1966 United States Grand Prix, held at Watkins Glen Grand Prix Race Course.
- Born: Thor Gjermund Eriksen, Norwegian journalist and Director-General of the Norwegian Broadcasting Corporation from 2013 to 2022; in Oslo
- Died: Luis Augusto Turcios Lima, 24, Guatemalan rebel leader, was killed in a car accident in Guatemala City when his car overturned and caught fire.

== October 3, 1966 (Monday) ==
- The Congress of Brazil voted to select Artur da Costa e Silva as the nation's 23rd President. Costa e Silva, a former General of the Brazilian Army and the hand-picked selection of President Humberto Castelo Branco, was unopposed, and received 295 votes from the majority party in Congress, the ARENA (Aliança REnovadora NAcional, or National Renewal Alliance). The opposing party, the Movimento Democrático Brasileiro (MDB), had only one-third of the seats in both the Chamber of Deputies and the Senate, and did not nominate a candidate, so Costa e Silva received 295 votes of the 472 electors.
- Only one month before the general election, U.S. Representative Charles Weltner of Georgia removed his name from the ballot, because he could not uphold his signed oath to support the nominees of the state Democratic Party. "I cannot compromise with hate... I cannot vote for Lester Maddox," he said, referring to the segregationist who had won the Democratic nomination primary.
- In the United Kingdom, the Morpeth to Reedsmouth line of the Great North Eastern Railway was closed.
- Tunisia severed diplomatic relations with the United Arab Republic.

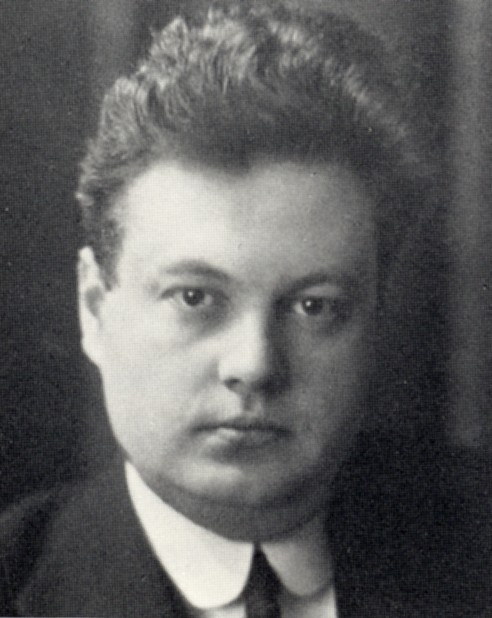
Rolf Sievert

- Died: Rolf Sievert, 70, Swedish physicist who pioneered the measurement of safe doses of radiation for medical treatment. The "sievert", abbreviated as "Sv" is the name that the International Committee for Weights and Measures would create in 1979 for a 100 roentgen unit of radiation dosage, and 1 Sv is the maximum cumulative radiation that a NASA astronaut is allowed during a career. Other units named for Sievert are the millisievert (mSv) and the microsievert (μSv).

== October 4, 1966 (Tuesday) ==
October 4, 1966: Kingdom of Lesotho granted independence

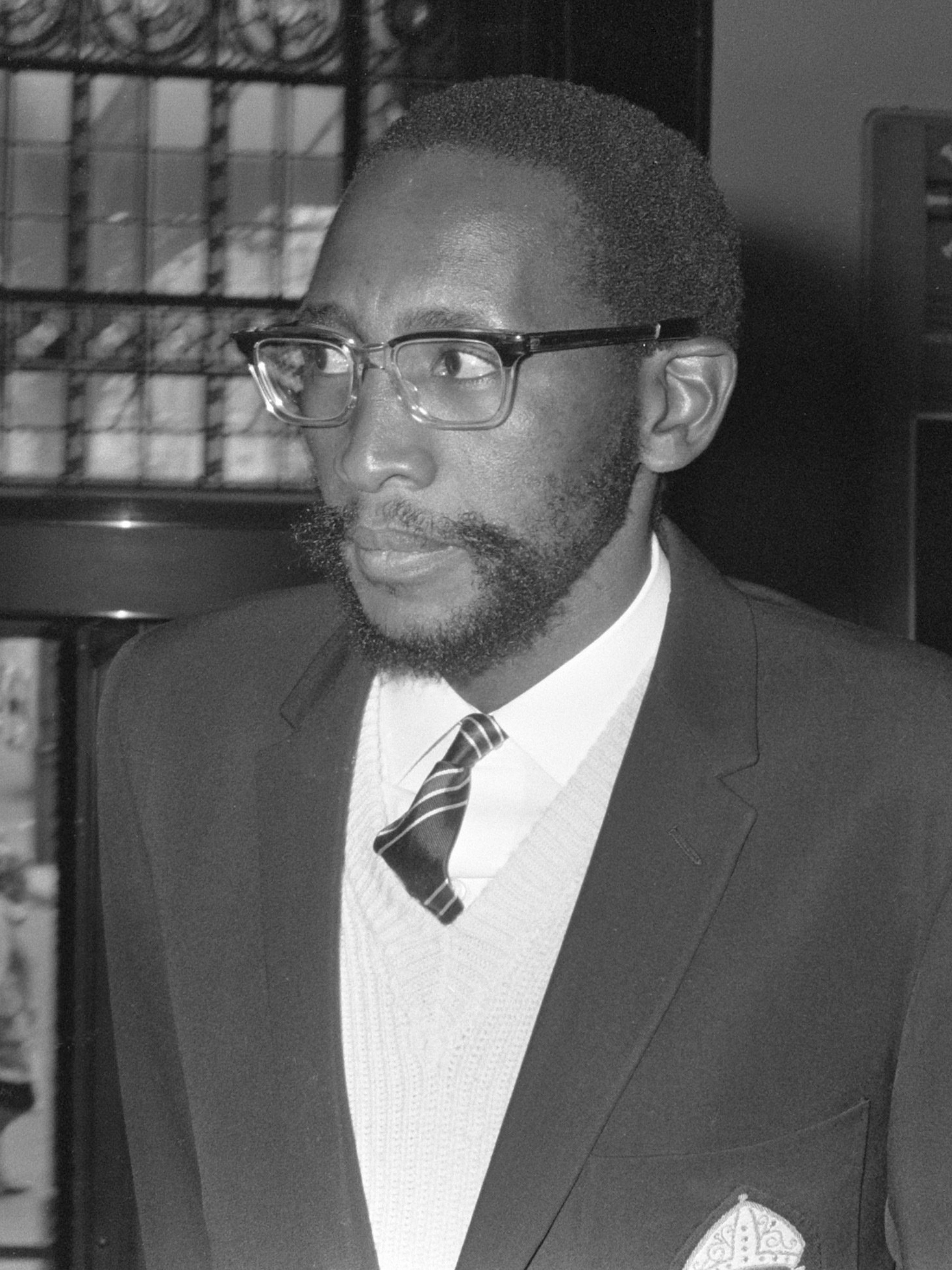
King Moshoehoe II

- Basutoland, a British colony surrounded completely by South Africa, was granted independence after midnight as the Kingdom of Lesotho, in a flag raising ceremony at Maseru. The new nation was governed by a constitutional monarchy, with a bicameral Parliament consisting of a Senate and an elected National Assembly. The paramount chief of the Sotho people, Constantine Bereng Seeiso, was crowned as King Moshoeshoe II of Lesotho.
- Israel applied for a treaty of association (though not a membership) in the European Economic Community (EEC), commonly referred to at the time as the "Common Market".
- Died: Sherman Billingsley, 70, American nightclub owner who founded and owned the prestigious Stork Club in New York City

== October 5, 1966 (Wednesday) ==
- The experimental Fermi 1 reactor at the Enrico Fermi Nuclear Generating Station, located near Detroit in Frenchtown Charter Township, Michigan, suffered a partial meltdown when its cooling system failed. The incident would later become the subject of a 1975 bestselling book, We Almost Lost Detroit, by John G. Fuller.
- The Texas Court of Criminal Appeals reversed the 1964 murder conviction and death sentence of Jack Ruby on grounds that the trial judge should have granted a motion for a change of venue to somewhere other than Dallas. "Jack Ruby was forced to trial under the most adverse, unusual, and extraordinary circumstances that this member of this court has yet to consider," Judge W.T. McDonald wrote in a concurring opinion. The Court remanded the case with instructions for a change of venue and a new trial. More people had witnessed Ruby's fatal shooting of accused presidential assassin Lee Harvey Oswald than any murder in history, as millions of people had watched the crime take place on live television on November 24, 1963. Although a new trial would be scheduled for February in Wichita Falls, Texas, Ruby would become sick with pneumonia on December 9, and would die of a pulmonary embolism on January 3, 1967, at Parkland Memorial Hospital, where John F. Kennedy and Lee Harvey Oswald had both been pronounced dead.
- North Korea's leader Kim Il Sung delivered a speech to the Korean Workers' Party that would later serve as "a rare instance... in which the United States was able to eventually look back and realize that later actions could be traced back to this specific threatening signal." Specifically, Kim called on his followers to "wage a positive struggle against U.S. imperialism", in the form of limited warfare against the American military presence in South Korea. Almost immediately, there was a surge of provocations at the Korean Demilitarized Zone, and the most aggressive action of all, the 1968 seizure of the USS Pueblo (AGER-2) and its crew.
- What would be described later as "the first successful, condemnatory burning of the Australian flag in recent memory" took place in Canberra outside The Lodge, the official residence of the prime minister, as a group of 30 students protested against Australia's continued involvement in the Vietnam War. A prior attempt, on September 9, had been stopped by angry bystanders.
- UNESCO signed the Recommendation Concerning the Status of Teachers. This event is now celebrated as World Teachers' Day.
- Born:
  - Inessa Kravets, Ukrainian Olympic champion athlete and holder of the women's world record for the triple jump for more than 20 years; in Dnipropetrovsk, Ukrainian SSR, Soviet Union
  - Sean M. Carroll, American theoretical physicist; in Philadelphia

== October 6, 1966 (Thursday) ==
- The hallucinogenic drug LSD (lysergic acid diethylamide) became illegal in the state of California as a new law went into effect at 12:01 a.m. California became the first state in the U.S. to ban LSD, and in 1970, LSD would be reclassified as a Schedule I drug nationwide by the Controlled Substances Act. The bill, sponsored by California state Senator Donald L. Grunsky, had been signed into law on May 30, 1966.
- The Love Pageant Rally took place in the Panhandle of Golden Gate Park, a narrower section that projected into San Francisco's Haight-Ashbury district.
- Born:
  - Niall Quinn, Irish soccer football player with 92 appearances for the Republic of Ireland national team; in Perrystown
  - Shirin Sharmin Chaudhury, the first female Speaker of the House for Bangladesh; in Noakhali
- Died: Mitchell Fields (born Mendel Feldman), 65, Romanian-American sculptor

== October 7, 1966 (Friday) ==
- The Jet Propulsion Laboratory in Pasadena, California, announced that NASA was considering JPL's suggestion for what would become the "Grand Tour program", after JPL aerospace engineer Gary Flandro pointed out the approach of a rare opportunity for exploration of four outer planets, Jupiter, Saturn, Uranus and Neptune, with one spacecraft. Flandro had noted that if a probe could be readied for launch within 12 years, the four planets would be closely aligned so that an optimal liftoff date of October 7, 1978 would reach all four over a nine-year voyage. A similar positioning of the planets would not happen again for 180 years. Homer Joe Stewart, JPL's manager of advanced studies, said later that by 1978, solar-electric systems could be developed for taking advantage of gravity assist (commonly called the "slingshot effect") to use one planet's gravitational field to propel a probe at high speed to the next planet on the tour. Given funding for two probes in case one failed, NASA would launch both in the summer of 1977, with Voyager 2 lifting off on August 20, 1977 and Voyager 1 16 days later on September 5. The alignment of Jupiter, Saturn, Uranus and Neptune will not happen again until the year 2155.
- In a major foreign policy speech in New York City to the National Conference of Editorial Writers, U.S. President Lyndon B. Johnson said that if the Soviet Union reduced its military forces in central Europe (East Germany and Czechoslovakia in particular), the United States would do the same and would urge its NATO allies to follow suit. "Europe is partitioned," he said, and referring to Germany, added "An unnatural line runs through the heart of a very great and a very proud nation. History warns us that until this harsh division has been resolved, peace in Europe will never be secure. We must turn to one of the great unfinished tasks of our generation--and that unfinished task is making Europe whole again".
- In Dorion, Quebec, 18 teenagers from Cité des Jeunes High School were killed along with their 21-year-old school bus driver, when the bus was struck by a Canadian National Railways freight train at a railroad crossing. The 42 passengers had recently won student government elections and were on their way to a dance at nearby Hudson. At 7:35 p.m., the bus had pulled onto the tracks and had not completed its crossing when the freight train sliced through it at 60 miles per hour (97 km/h).
- NASA revised the division of duties of the Marshall Space Flight Center (MSFC) and Manned Spacecraft Center (MSC) in connection with extravehicular activity (EVA) studies. MSC would be responsible for development of EVA equipment and procedures, including astronaut participation, while MSFC would develop larger structures in space that might require astronaut EVA for maintenance and repair.
- The Soviet Union declared that all Chinese students must leave the country before the end of October. According to the Soviet news agency TASS, the order came under "the principle of reciprocity" after the Communist Chinese government had declared on September 20 that it would cease allowing Soviet exchange students to study at Chinese universities.
- Born: Sherman Alexie, American filmmaker and poet; in Spokane, Washington

== October 8, 1966 (Saturday) ==
- Two days before Soviet Foreign Minister Andrei A. Gromyko met with U.S. President Lyndon Johnson, the Soviet Union announced that it was rejecting the United Kingdom's six-point plan to end the Vietnam War. British Foreign Secretary George Brown met with Gromyko in London and proposed that the two nations arrange a peace conference in Geneva. The Soviet position was that, until North Vietnam requested a conference, the USSR would not push for peace negotiations.
- An attempt to protect ten offshore oil workers from the approach of Hurricane Inez ended in tragedy when the evacuation helicopter crashed only seconds after Shell Oil employees had climbed aboard. The Bell 204 had lifted off from an oil platform but fell 300 feet (91 m) into the Gulf of Mexico only 30 seconds after takeoff, killing all 11 people on board.
- Born: Felipe Camiroaga, Chilean television presenter; in Santiago (d. 2011)
- Died:
  - Johnny Kidd (stage name for Frederick Albert Heath), 30, British rock singer and lead singer for Johnny Kidd & the Pirates. Kidd was killed in a car accident, when the car he was riding in collided head-on with another vehicle.
  - Célestin Freinet, 69, French educator who founded the Modern School Movement
  - Juan Batlle Planas, 55, Spanish-born Argentine surrealist painter

== October 9, 1966 (Sunday) ==
- The Baltimore Orioles defeated the Los Angeles Dodgers in Game 4 of the World Series, 1–0, to sweep the series for their first world championship. Frank Robinson clouted a home run in the fourth inning for the game's only run.
- South Korean forces reportedly massacred 168 South Vietnamese civilians by in the village of Binh Tai in South Vietnam's Sông Bé Province.
- Born:
  - David Cameron, Prime Minister of the United Kingdom from 2010 to 2016; in Marylebone, London
  - Yekaterina Golubeva, Russian film actress; in Leningrad (d. 2011)

== October 10, 1966 (Monday) ==
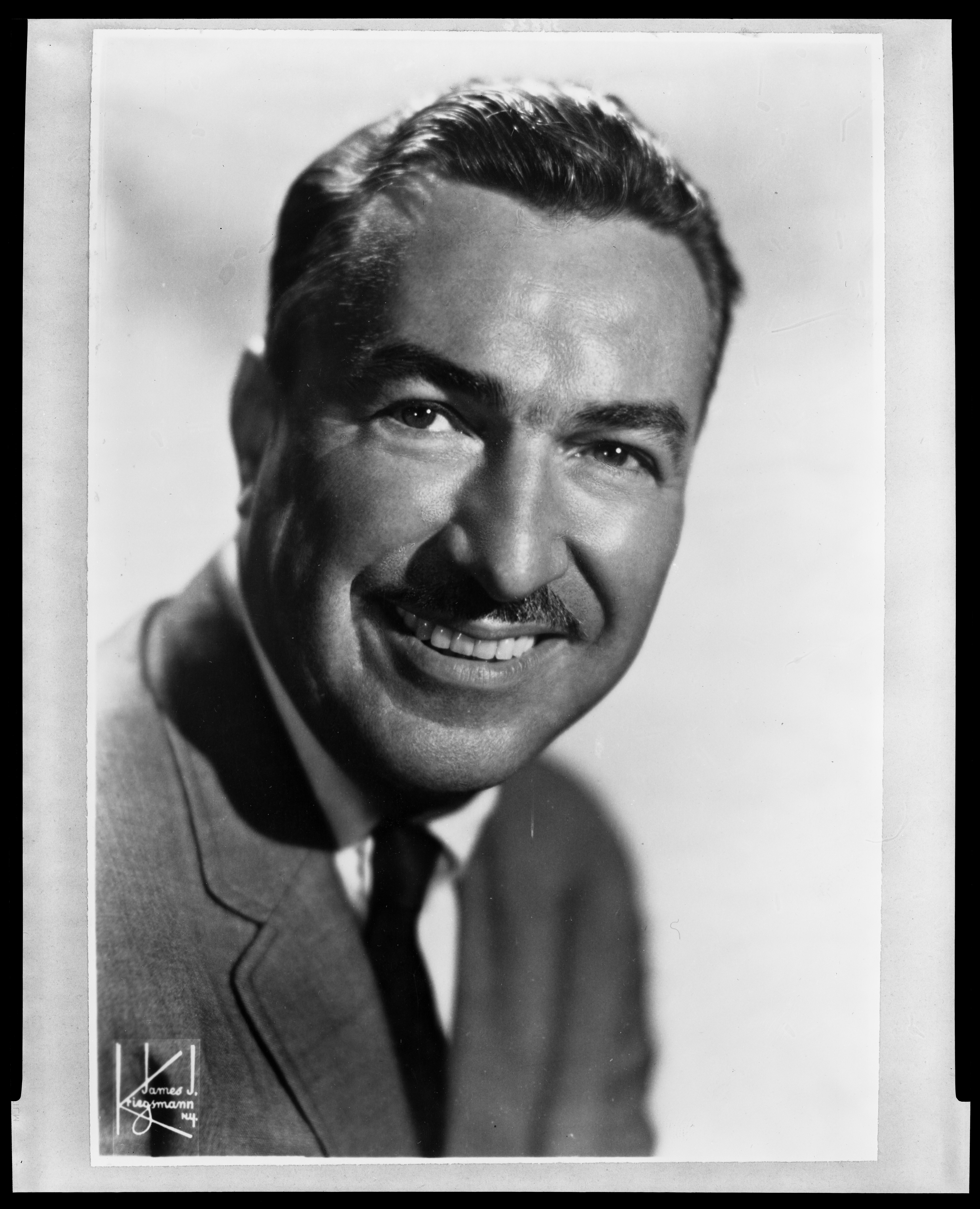
Congressman Powell

- A jury unanimously found U.S. Representative Adam Clayton Powell Jr. of New York guilty of five counts of criminal contempt. Powell had been prosecuted after repeatedly disobeying court orders to appear for questioning regarding his failure to pay a $164,000 defamation judgment and faced a jail term of up to 150 days.
- Members of the International Academy of Astronautics convened the first world conference on communication with extraterrestrial intelligence (CETI) in Madrid. The study group consisted of four scientists from the U.S. (Fred L. Whipple, Frederick I. Ordway III, A. G. Haley and E. B. Konecci), two from the USSR (Iosif Shklovsky and Vitaly Ginzburg), and one each from Sweden (Carl-Johan Clemedson) and Czechoslovakia (Chairman Rudolf Pešek).
- Bob Moog applied for the only patent ever granted for his invention, the Moog synthesizer, specifically for the Moog ladder filter that provides the electronic tones that give the synthesizer its distinctive sound. The patent would be granted on October 28, 1969.
- The Beach Boys released their hit song "Good Vibrations", their most popular record ever. The song would reach #1 on the charts in the United States, the United Kingdom, Australia, New Zealand and Malaysia.
- The NATO Defense College moved from Paris to Rome, 15 years after its creation on November 19, 1951.
- Ghalib II al-Qu'aiti became the Sultan of Qu'aiti, now a part of Yemen. He would reign for less than a year, until the monarchy was abolished by a rebel government on September 17, 1967.
- Born:
  - Carolyn R. Bertozzi, American biochemist awarded the Nobel Prize in Chemistry in 2022; in Boston
  - Tony Adams, English footballer with 65 appearances in the England national team; in Romford, East London
  - Bai Ling, Chinese actress; in Chengdu, Sichuan province
- Died:
  - Charlotte Cooper, 96, English tennis star who won five Wimbledon singles championships (1895, 1896, 1898, 1901 and 1908)
  - Kurt Bolender, 54, German war criminal who eluded capture until 1961, hanged himself in his prison cell during a recess in his trial.
  - Wilfrid Lawson, 66, English actor, died of a heart attack
  - Robert Desoille, 76, French psychotherapist

== October 11, 1966 (Tuesday) ==
- President Johnson signed the Child Nutrition Act into law. Among other things, it supplemented the existing National School Lunch Program by establishing the School Breakfast Program, initially as a two-year pilot program for schools in poor neighborhoods.
- The Roman Catholic Diocese of Miracema do Tocantins and the Roman Catholic Diocese of Ipameri were established in Brazil.
- France and the Soviet Union signed a treaty for cooperation in nuclear research.
- Born: Luke Perry, American television actor (Beverly Hills, 90210); as Coy Luther Perry III in Mansfield, Ohio (d. 2019)
- Died: Roger Sherman Loomis, 78, American expert on medieval literature

== October 12, 1966 (Wednesday) ==
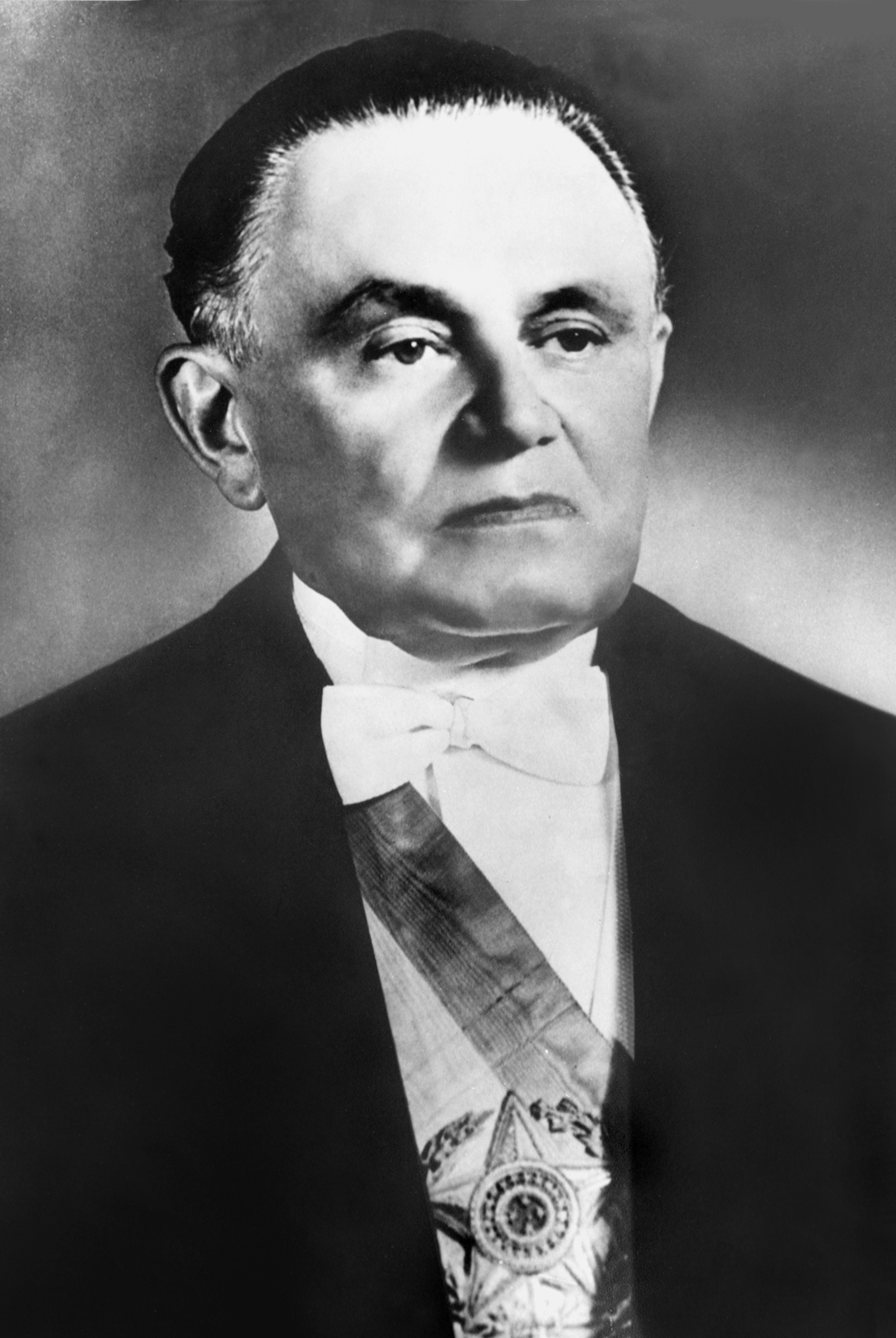
Castelo Branco

- Nine days after his civilian successor had been elected by the national congress, the Brazilian president, General Humberto Castelo Branco caused a constitutional crisis by issuing a decree removing six of the legislators from office. General Castelo Branco acted under a previously authorized procedure referred to as cassação de mandato (cancellation of mandate), despite having assured the president of the Chamber of Deputies, Adauto Lúcio Cardoso, that there would be no further cancellations. Cardoso defied his president, ruled that the six congressmen could continue to serve, and offered them an opportunity to defend themselves in Congress. Castelo Branco's use of force brought the two parties, ARENA and MDB, together in challenging the President, and on October 20, he would respond by closing the Brazilian Congress for one month, citing "counterrevolutionary elements who attempt to bring tumult" as his reason.
- Only five months after it had become independent from the United Kingdom, Guyana found that its territory was being encroached upon by the neighboring nation of Venezuela. In February, Ankoko Island, located in the Cuyuni River that separated Venezuela and Guyana, had been divided by an agreement signed in Geneva, but Venezuelan troops moved onto the Guyanese half of the island after the British government had withdrawn.
- Gunter Schuller's opera, The Visitation, premiered in Hamburg, West Germany.
- Died: Arthur Lourié (stage name for Naum Izrailevich Luria), 74, Russian-born classical composer

== October 13, 1966 (Thursday) ==
- Dr. Charles Brenton Huggins of the University of Chicago, and Dr. Peyton Rous of Rockefeller University, were awarded the 1966 Nobel Prize in Medicine for their contribution to cancer research.
- William R. Rivkin, 57, was appointed United States Ambassador to Senegal; Rivkin would die in post the following year.
- The London Film Makers Cooperative (LFMC) was founded.
- Died: Clifton Webb (stage name for Webb Hollenbeck), 76, American stage and film actor best known for his "Mr. Belvedere" movies

== October 14, 1966 (Friday) ==
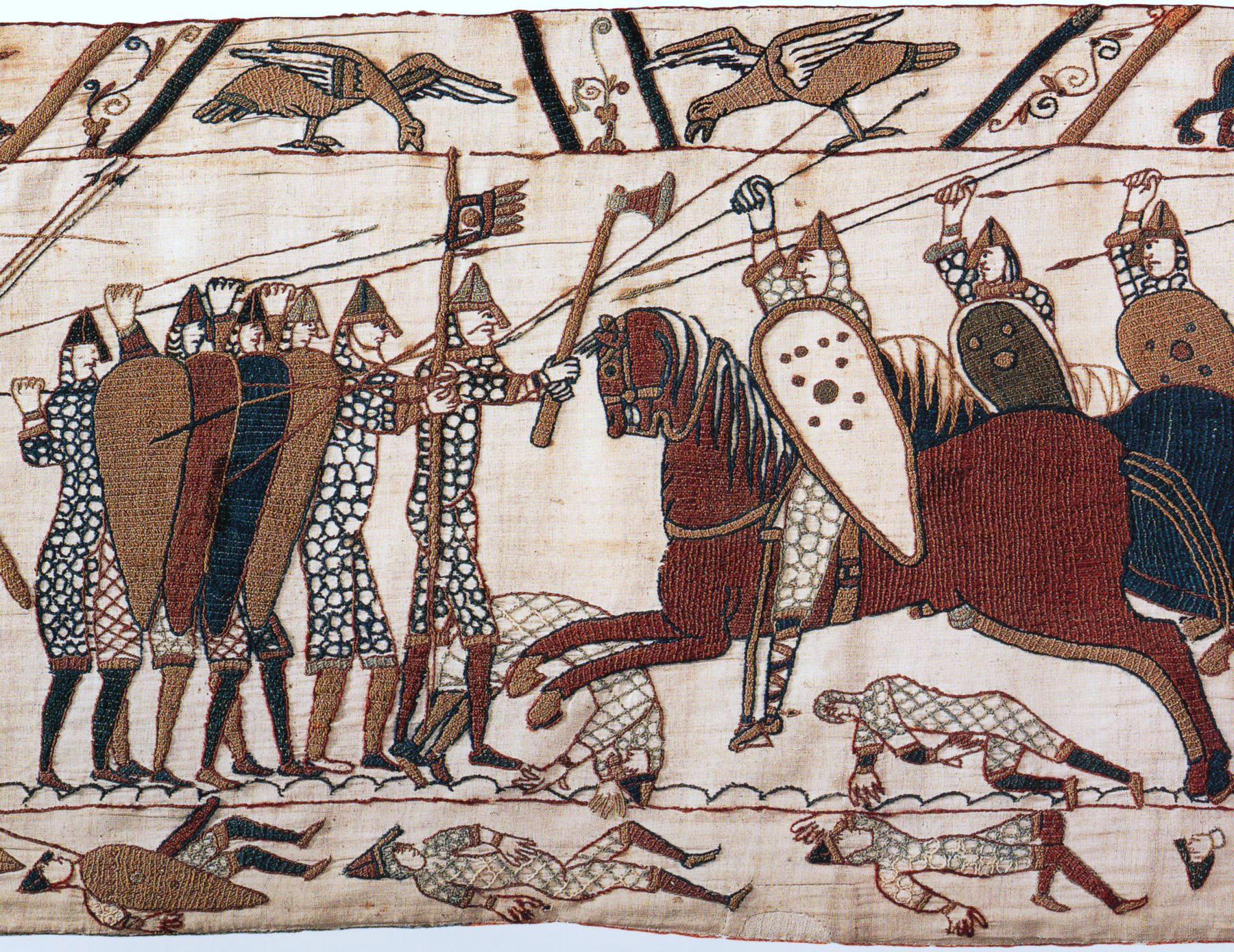
October 14, 1966: 900th anniversary of Battle of Hastings observed

- The 900th anniversary of the Battle of Hastings was observed, celebrating the pivotal October 14, 1066, confrontation of the Norman Conquest of England, the death in combat of King Harold II, and the beginning of a new regal dynasty under William the Conqueror, who became king after his armies won. To mark the occasion, the General Post Office of the United Kingdom released 197,000,000 commemorative four-penny stamps throughout Britain. Philatelists purchased sheets of the stamps for their collections, and some found errors that increased the rarity (and the value) of their purchase, including one example in Parkstone where the image of the Queen had been omitted.

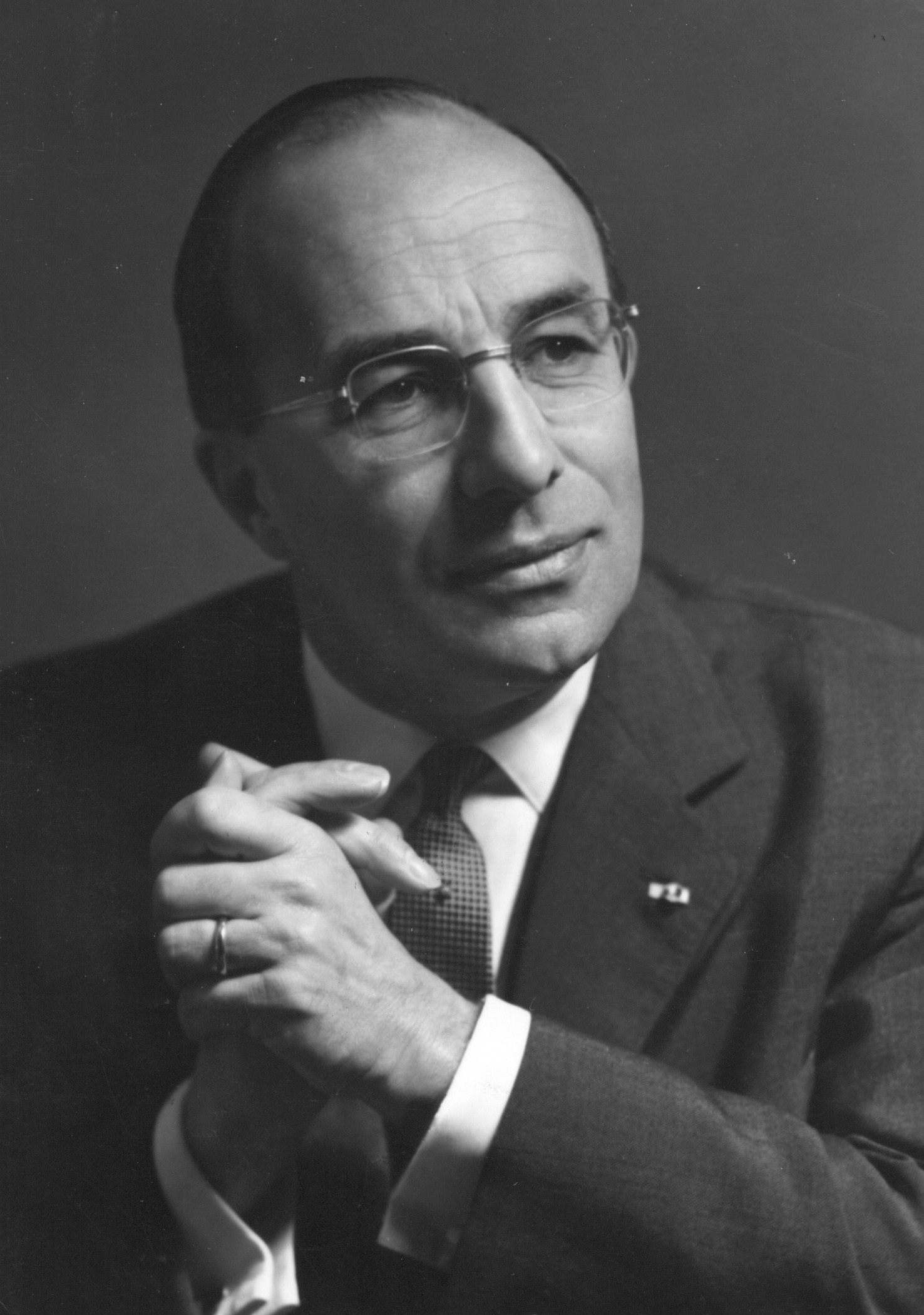
Jo Cals

- Jo Cals resigned as the Prime Minister of the Netherlands, along with his entire cabinet, after his own Catholic People's Party withdrew its support for him and pushed through a vote of no confidence. In the 150 member Second Chamber of the Staten-Generaal, the vote was 75–62 against the Cals government because of its unsuccessful fiscal policies, and only four of the 50 deputies from Cals's party supported him.
- At 2:15 p.m. local time, the Montreal Metro, the new subway system for the Canadian city, was inaugurated with a declaration made by the guest of honor, French Minister of State Louis Joxe (as an emissary of French President De Gaulle) "and, within moments, trains filled with hundreds of special guests, pull out of 19 stations along north-south and east-west lines to converge on the Berri-de Montigny station, where the two lines meet." The first of 5,000 passengers that day were greeted by Mayor Jean Drapeau, Quebec Premier Daniel Johnson, Sr., and External Affairs Secretary Paul Martin.
- After his return from his tour of South Vietnam, U.S. Secretary of Defense Robert S. McNamara sent a secret memo to President Johnson conceding that the U.S. effort in the Vietnam War was failing, noting that the government of North Vietnam "knows that we can't achieve our goals. The prognosis is bad that the war can be brought to a satisfactory conclusion within the next two years... I see no reasonable way to bring the war to an end soon."
- The International Centre for Settlement of Investment Disputes (ICSID) was established as the Convention on the Settlement of Investment Disputes between States and Nationals of Other States went into effect upon ratification by 20 nations.
- The North Yemen Civil War took on a larger dimension with government air raids of villages in the northern mountains, including the bombing of two villages in Saudi Arabia.
- The Soviet optical film-return reconnaissance satellite Kosmos 129 was launched from Plesetsk Cosmodrome.

== October 15, 1966 (Saturday) ==
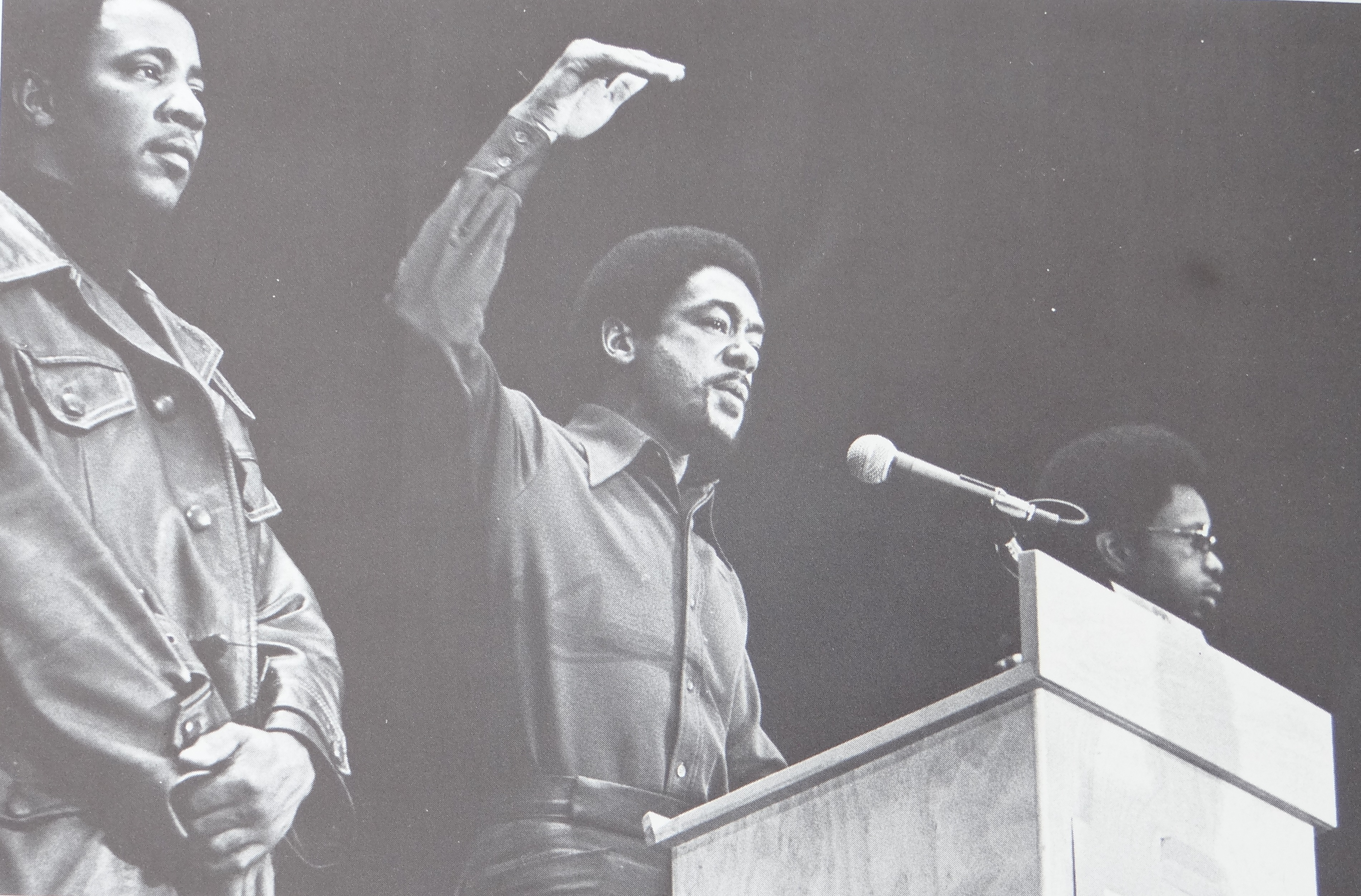
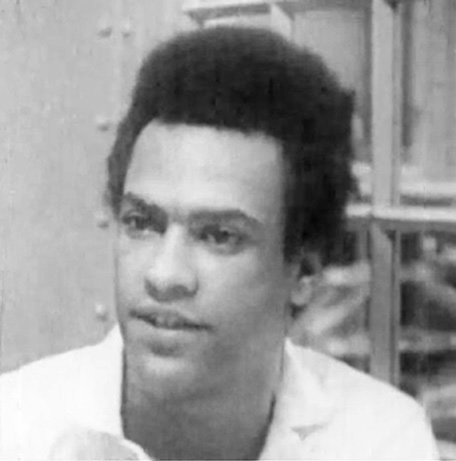
Bobby Seale and Huey Newton
- In Oakland, California, the Black Panther Party was created by Bobby Seale and Huey P. Newton, who drafted the party's "Ten Point Program" with a list of "What We Want" and explanations of the demands under the heading "What We Believe". Seale and Newton chose the name and logo after getting mail from a similarly named organization in Lowndes County, Alabama.
- U.S. President Lyndon B. Johnson signed a bill creating the United States Department of Transportation, the 12th Cabinet-level Department in the United States government. "During the next two decades," Johnson said, "the demand for transportation will be doubled. But we are already falling behind. Our lifeline is tangled." The "DOT" would begin operations on April 1, 1967, with Alan S. Boyd as the first U.S. Secretary of Transportation.
- On the same day, President Johnson signed the National Historic Preservation Act of 1966, creating the National Register of Historic Places that is maintained by the United States Department of the Interior.
- ABC telecast a highly acclaimed 90-minute television adaptation of the musical Brigadoon, starring Robert Goulet, Peter Falk, and Sally Ann Howes. It would win many Emmy Awards and would inaugurate a short-lived series of special television adaptations of famous Broadway musicals on ABC.
- Born: Jorge Campos, Mexican soccer football player with 130 appearances for the Mexico national team; in Acapulco

== October 16, 1966 (Sunday) ==
- One year to the day after her first performance for the rock group The Great Society, singer Grace Slick (stage name for Grace Barnett Wing) made her first appearance with Jefferson Airplane, beginning a 20-year career that would see the group rise to international commercial success. In her debut with Jefferson Airplane, at The Fillmore in San Francisco, she replaced Signe Anderson.
- In two associated referendums in Switzerland, voters were asked whether they approved of an amendment to the constitution on Swiss citizens living abroad and a popular initiative "for the fight against alcoholism". The constitutional amendment was approved while the popular initiative was rejected.
- Born: Mary Elizabeth McGlynn, American voice actress; in Newark, New Jersey
- Died: George O'Hara, 67, American silent film actor and writer

== October 17, 1966 (Monday) ==
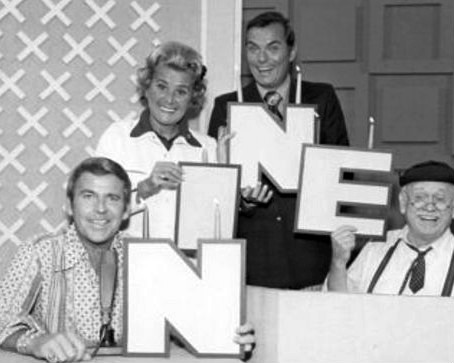
Some Hollywood Square contestants in 1974: Paul Lynde, Rose Marie, Peter Marshall and Charlie Weaver

- At 11:30 a.m. Eastern time, The Hollywood Squares made its television debut as a new game show on the NBC television network. The show, hosted by Peter Marshall, featured nine celebrities (mostly comedians) as panelists appearing on a set evocative of the game tic-tac-toe, and regularly featuring suggestive jokes and double entendres; although Paul Lynde would become identified with his place on the board, Ernest Borgnine occupied the center square on the first broadcast.Daily News critic Kay Gardella commented, "Eureka! Finally, a game show has arrived on TV that doesn't take itself too seriously, and is still fun to play." The Squares format would inspire similar shows in other nations, starting in 1975 with Celebrity Squares on Network Ten in Australia.
- In Denver, Colorado, an American organization called Housewives for Lower Food Prices began a boycott of five major supermarket chains in the area, including Safeway, Red Owl, King Soopers, and Furr's groceries. Publicity from the boycott led other groups in North America to begin their own campaigns to avoid overpriced food chains, spreading to cities like Dallas, Albuquerque, New Mexico, Charlotte, North Carolina and Windsor, Ontario, and then to nearly half of the states in the U.S. The protests (which included complaints about prices being driven up by giveaways and trading stamps programs) would lead to Congressional investigations and ultimately stricter penalties for anti-competitive measures by grocers.
- Twelve New York firefighters were killed, and 17 others injured, in what was, at that time, the worst disaster in the history of the New York City Fire Department. Most were members of Engine Company 18, and were on the ground floor of the Wonder Drug Store on East 23rd Street when the terrazzo floor beneath them collapsed, plunging them into the fire in the basement and bringing down the walls on top of them.
- The government of Zambia acquired the 165-square-mile (430 km^{2}) Lochinvar Ranch from brothers Harry Wulfsohn and Edwin Wulfsohn, for 40,000 British pounds, and transformed it from a former cattle ranch into a wildlife preserve, which would reopen as the Lochinvar National Park in 1972. The park, with 420 different species of animals, is one of the most popular tourist attractions in the southern African nation.
- An earthquake struck Peru, killing more than 100 people. The Huaura Province reported 72 deaths, most of them in the provincial capital at Huacho, while the port city of Callao, and the capital, Lima, also suffered fatalities.
- Died:
  - Bob Swift, 51, former American League baseball catcher, died three months after having to retire from managing the Detroit Tigers because of lung cancer.
  - Dhammalok Mahasthavir, 76, Nepalese Buddhist monk who revived the Theravada branch
  - Karel Hruška, 75, Czech opera tenor, actor and radio personality
  - Wieland Wagner, 49, German opera director, died from lung cancer.

== October 18, 1966 (Tuesday) ==
- Timothy Evans, who had been hanged in Britain's Pentonville Prison on March 9, 1950, for a double murder of which he had been innocent, received a posthumous pardon from Queen Elizabeth II after it was discovered that his confession had been coerced and that the chief witness against him, John Christie, had been a serial killer."
- The Apple Tree, a Jerry Bock and Sheldon Harnick musical, opened on Broadway for the first of 463 performances.
- The Ford Cortina MK2 was launched in the United Kingdom.
- Born: Angela Visser, Netherlands beauty queen who was crowned Miss Universe in 1989; in Nieuwerkerk aan den IJssel
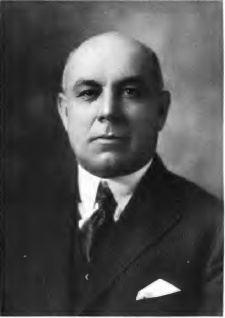
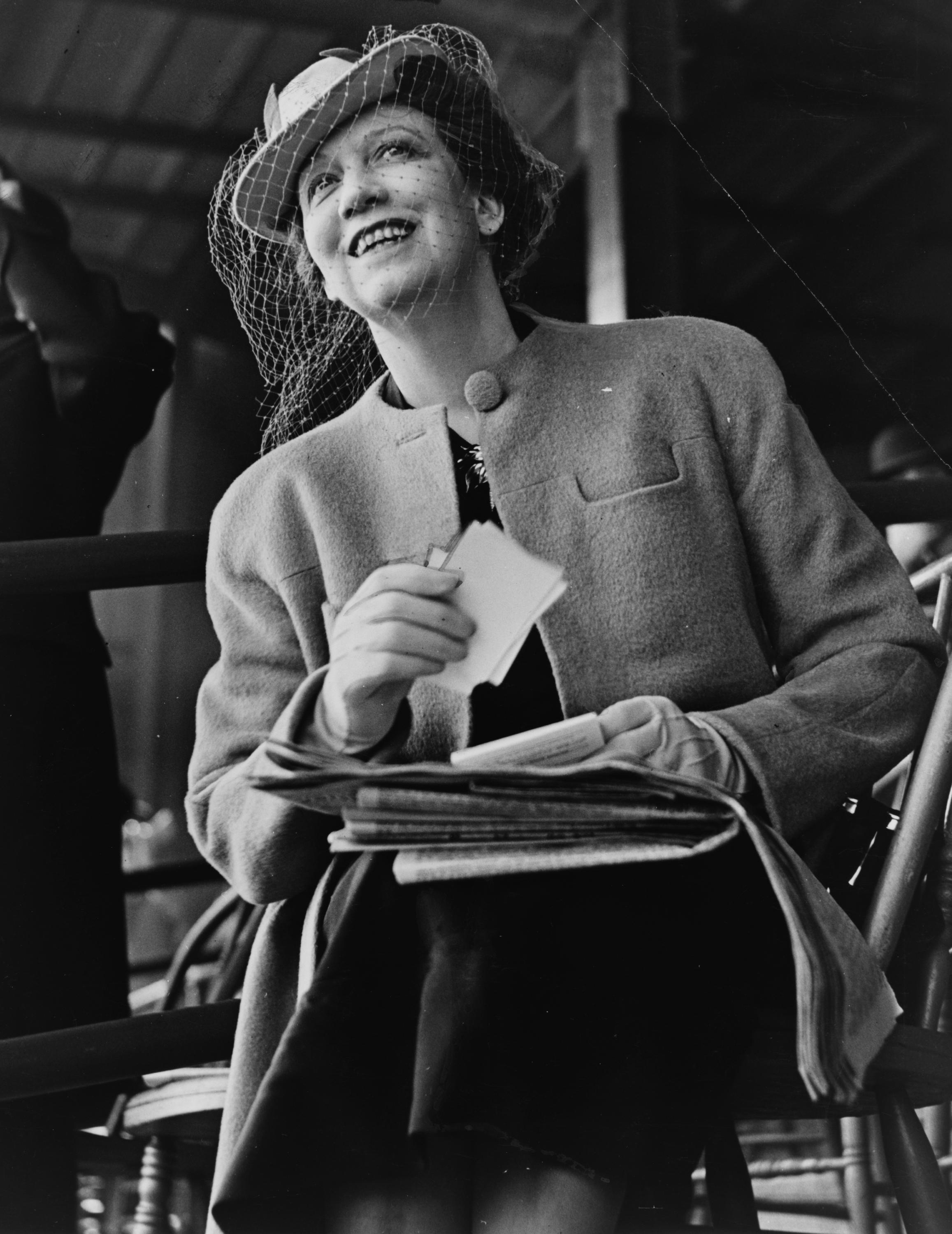
Multi-millionaires Arden and Kresge
- Died:
  - Sebastian S. Kresge, 99, American multimillionaire who turned a single "five and dime" store in Detroit into a nationwide chain of 930 S.S. Kresge stores across the United States, and the Kmart discount department stores.
  - Elizabeth Arden (Florence Nightingale Graham), 81, Canadian-born American beautician and cosmetics entrepreneur. One of the wealthiest women in the world, Arden left an estate of almost $50,000,000.

== October 19, 1966 (Wednesday) ==
- Bobby Orr, formerly the captain of the minor league Oshawa Generals, played his very first National Hockey League game, appearing for the Boston Bruins, and beginning a 12-year career that would include eight consecutive awards of the James Norris Memorial Trophy for the NHL's best defenseman.
- Paramount Pictures was saved from bankruptcy when it was acquired by the conglomerate Gulf and Western Industries, an event that one film historian would later call "the birth of corporate Hollywood".
- Born: Jon Favreau, American film director whose Paramount Pictures films, Iron Man and Iron Man 2, grossed a combined total of 1.2 billion dollars; in Flushing, Queens, New York

== October 20, 1966 (Thursday) ==
- Soviet First Secretary Leonid Brezhnev and his guests (including Fidel Castro of Cuba, Nicolae Ceaușescu of Romania, János Kádár of Hungary, Willi Stoph of East Germany, Yumjaagiin Tsedenbal and the Communist Party leaders of several other Soviet allies) were at Baikonur Cosmodrome to witness Operation Palma 3, the launch of five rockets and missiles. In addition to the powerful N1 rocket that placed a seventh Molniya-1 communications satellite into orbit, the leaders also watched four ICBM launches, with a UR-100 (known in the West as the SS-11 Sego), an R-36 (the SS-9 Scarp) and two R-36 missiles (SS-7 Saddler), one from a missile silo and the other from the ground.
- The West German submarine U-9 was launched. After being decommissioned in 1993, the 144-foot (44 m) long sub would be displayed as a permanent exhibit outside the Technology Museum in the city of Speyer, Rheinland-Pfalz.
- Born: Stefan Raab, German television comedian and musician; in Köln, West Germany
- Died:
  - Harry F. Byrd, 79, U.S. Senator for Virginia for more than 32 years and one of the most powerful men in the U.S. Senate until his resignation for health reasons in 1965. As Governor of Virginia from 1926 to 1930, he reduced the state government from 100 departments to only 12, turned a deep deficit into a financial surplus in four years, and called himself the "fiscal watchdog" over the federal budget. In 1960, despite not being on the ballot for president, Byrd received 15 electoral votes from dissatisfied Electoral College members in Mississippi, Alabama and Oklahoma.
  - Mohamed Fawzi, 48, Egyptian composer who wrote the music for "Kassaman", adopted in 1963 as the National Anthem of Algeria

== October 21, 1966 (Friday) ==
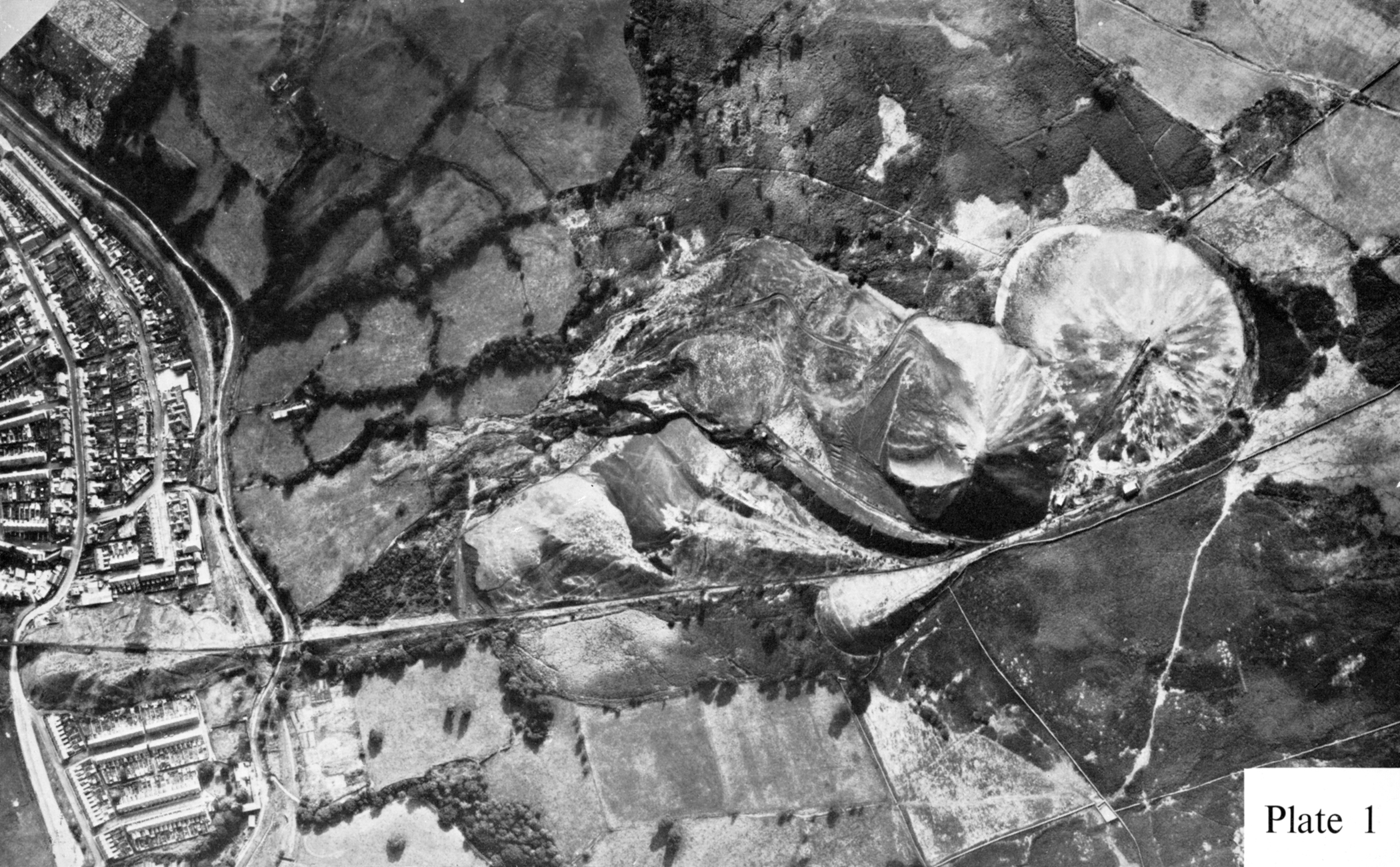
Aberfan spoil heaps before the disaster...

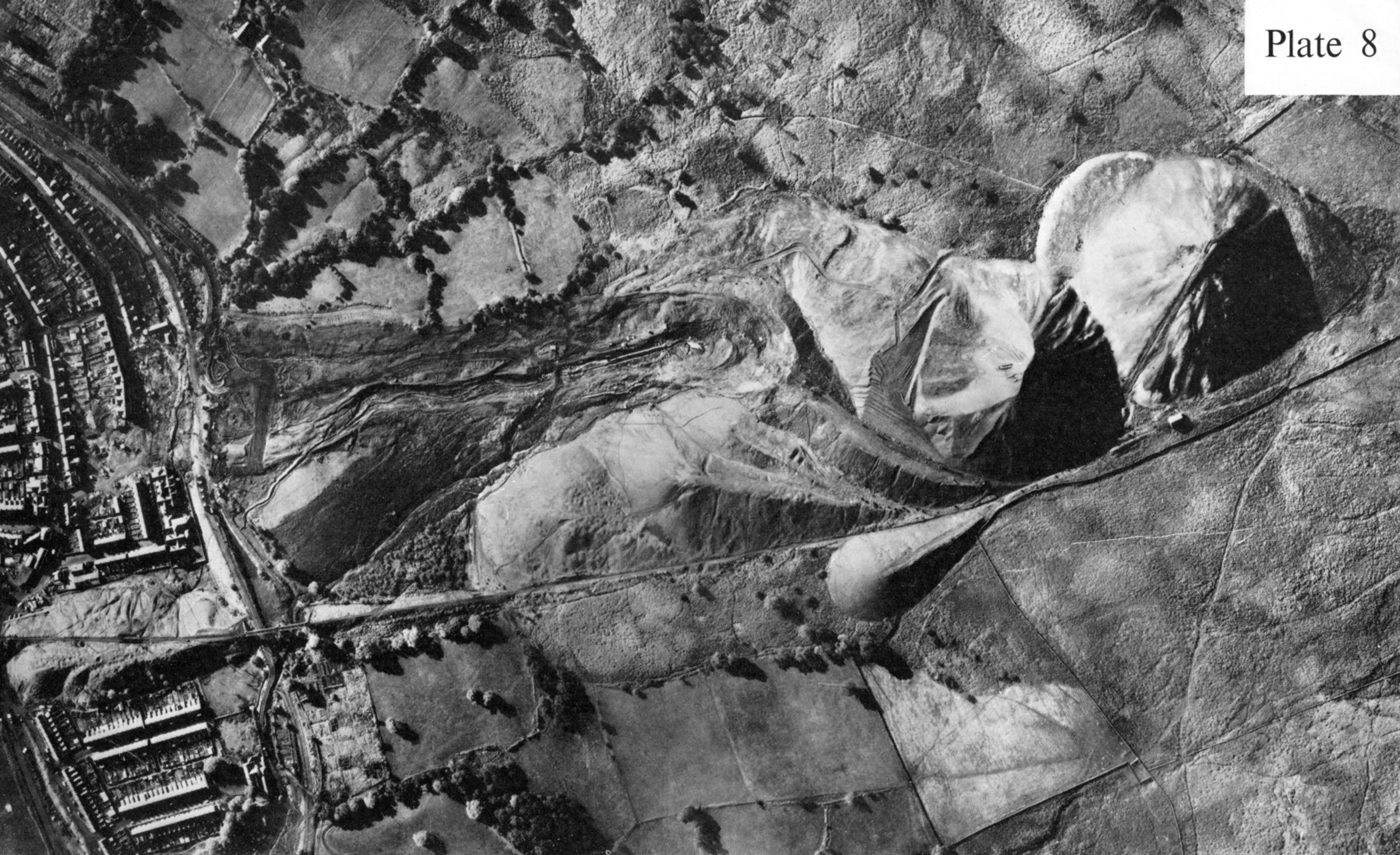
... and after

- An avalanche killed 116 schoolchildren and 28 adults at Pantglas Junior School in the South Wales village of Aberfan. At 9:15 in the morning, shortly after the school day had started, a slag heap (or spoil tip) overlooking the school suddenly collapsed, sending two million tons of rock, coal and mud cascading down the hill. Over the years, the heap had risen to a height of 80 feet (24 m), until heavy rains weakened it. Most of the children, who were buried alive in their classrooms, ranged in age from eight years old to ten years old. It would later be discovered to have been caused by a build-up of water in the accumulated rock and shale, which suddenly started to slide downhill in the form of slurry.
- The United States Congress approved the AFL–NFL merger. According to later reports, Congressman Hale Boggs, the majority whip of the U.S. House of Representatives, and U.S. Senate Finance Committee Chairman Russell B. Long, both of Louisiana, had conditioned their facilitation of the merger, through an antitrust law exemption, on the award of an NFL franchise to New Orleans. As NFL Commissioner Pete Rozelle and Boggs were walking to the House chamber, Rozelle reportedly said, "I don't know how I can ever thank you enough for this," and Boggs replied, "What do you mean you don't know how to thank me? New Orleans gets an immediate franchise in the NFL." When Rozelle said that he would "do everything I can", Boggs stopped, walked back toward the committee room, and said, "Well, we can always call off the vote..." The New Orleans Saints franchise would be announced eleven days later, on November 1.
- MSC officials reviewed the airlock module (AM) on the S-IVB spacecraft at the McDonnell plant in St. Louis, and concluded that two design problems were serious. Specifically, the design relied totally on passive thermal control for the S-IVB, and there was a lack of definition on extravehicular and intravehicular equipment.
- French philosopher Jacques Derrida delivered a lecture La Structure, le signe et le jeu dans le discours des sciences humaines ("Structure, sign, and play in the discourse of the human sciences") to a structuralism colloquium at Johns Hopkins University, bringing his work on literary theory to international prominence.
- Ten thousand firefighters lined Fifth Avenue in New York City for the funeral procession of 10 of the firemen killed in the 23rd Street Fire on October 17.
- The Yakovlev Yak-40 airliner made its maiden flight.

== October 22, 1966 (Saturday) ==
- British spy George Blake escaped from the maximum security Wormwood Scrubs prison, where he was in the fifth year of a 42-year prison sentence for espionage. Blake, who had been the British vice-consul to South Korea when the North Koreans invaded in 1950, had been a prisoner in the Communist nation until 1953, and became an adherent of Communism during his incarceration, and a spy for the Soviet Union after he resumed service to the British government. Blake would successfully flee to Moscow.
- The Philippines inter-island steamer MV Pioneer Leyte collided with an American freighter ship, the Golden State, and sank off Manila with the loss of 44 lives.

== October 23, 1966 (Sunday) ==
- Che Guevara left Cuba for the last time, flying from Havana to Moscow with a Cuban passport in the name Luis Hernandez Galvan, then to Prague as Ramon Benitez of Uruguay, to Vienna as Adolfo Mena of Uruguay, and, ultimately, to Bolivia, where he would be killed in an ambush on October 9, 1967.
- INS Nilgiri, the first Indian Navy ship built in India, rather than a foreign shipyard, was commissioned. In a collaboration with Yarrow Shipbuilders of Scotland, the first of the Nilgiri-class frigates had been constructed in Mumbai at the Mazagon Docks.
- Died: Claire McDowell, 88, American silent film actress

== October 24, 1966 (Monday) ==
- The retrial of Dr. Sam Sheppard began, four months after the U.S. Supreme Court had concluded that he had been denied a fair trial and had been convicted (on December 21, 1954) of murdering his wife. The new proceedings would bring fame to Dr. Sheppard's new lawyer, F. Lee Bailey of Boston. Sheppard would be found not guilty on November 16.
- Born: Roman Abramovich, Russian billionaire businessman, investor and politician; in Saratov, Russian SFSR, Soviet Union
- Died:
  - Hans Dreier, 81, Academy Award-winning art director
  - Sofya Yanovskaya, 72, Soviet mathematician

== October 25, 1966 (Tuesday) ==
- Meeting at the Manila Summit Conference, seven nations agreed to a common plan for ending their participation in the Vietnam War. In the Manila Communique, signed by U.S. President Lyndon Johnson, South Vietnam's Prime Minister Nguyen Cao Ky, and other leaders, the nations endorsed a six-point peace proposal and offered to withdraw the allied forces from South Vietnam completely within six months after "the other side withdraws its forces to the North, ceases infiltration, and the level of violence thus subsides." However, North Vietnam's Prime Minister Pham Van Dong, referring to the Munich Agreement between Adolf Hitler and Neville Chamberlain in 1938, responded, "Never Munich again, in whatever form," and pledged that his nation "will fight until final victory against the U.S. imperialists."
- The Luna 12 space probe, launched by the Soviet Union on October 22, entered orbit around the Moon in order to photograph potential landing sites for a crewed mission. With higher resolution television cameras (1100 scan lines) and a closer orbital approach than previous Soviet probes (as near as 103 kilometres (64 mi)), Luna 12 returned images in which 15-metre (49 ft) long objects could be discerned. Most of the photos, taken from a nearly equatorial lunar orbit, were not released.
- A military court in Jakarta sentenced Indonesia's ex-foreign minister Subandrio to death, on charges of being involved in the 30 September Movement. The sentence would be reduced to life imprisonment upon the intervention of the British government.
- Three days after accusing Britain's Royal Air Force of flying over Spanish territory in order to reach Gibraltar, Spain closed off its border crossing at La Línea de la Concepción, the only land connection between the British colony and the rest of Europe.
- The People's Republic of China successfully test-fired a nuclear missile for the first time, with an accurate hit and an atomic blast at a pre-determined target in the Lop Nor desert site.
- The British House of Commons voted 307–239 to approve the Labour government's compulsory freeze on wages and prices, with a 500-pound sterling fine against violators.
- Gemini Program Deputy Manager Kenneth S. Kleinknecht, ordered two S-IVB trainers for use in crew training and crew evaluation of hardware for the airlock, as well as full-scale S-IVB neutral buoyancy trainer and a full-scale, high-fidelity, one-g trainer. On the same day, MSFC issued its research and development plan for the Orbital Workshop (OWS), which had won approval for the Saturn/Apollo Applications 209 mission (SAA-209), a backup for the Apollo-Saturn 209. The primary purpose of SAA-209 was developing a spent S-IVB stage into a habitable space structure for extended Earth-orbiting missions.
- Died: Floyd MacMillan Davis, 70, American illustrator

== October 26, 1966 (Wednesday) ==
- A fire killed 44 crewmen on the aircraft carrier USS Oriskany in the Gulf of Tonkin and seriously injured 15 others. Of the dead, 34 were U.S. Navy officers, of whom 24 of them were U.S. Navy pilots. The fire began at 7:21 a.m., in a locker containing flares and spread through the forward hangar bay, eventually burning parts of five decks. An investigation found that the fire had been caused initially by the careless handling of a single magnesium parachute flare, which accidentally ignited after two sailors were returning unused flares from aircraft to a storage compartment. In a panic, one of the men tossed the flare into a storage locker containing 700 more flares, setting off flames hot enough to melt metal. The loss of life would have been greater had it not been for the work of crewmen who were able to push 343 of the ship's bombs, some of them weighing 2,000 pounds (910 kg), overboard.

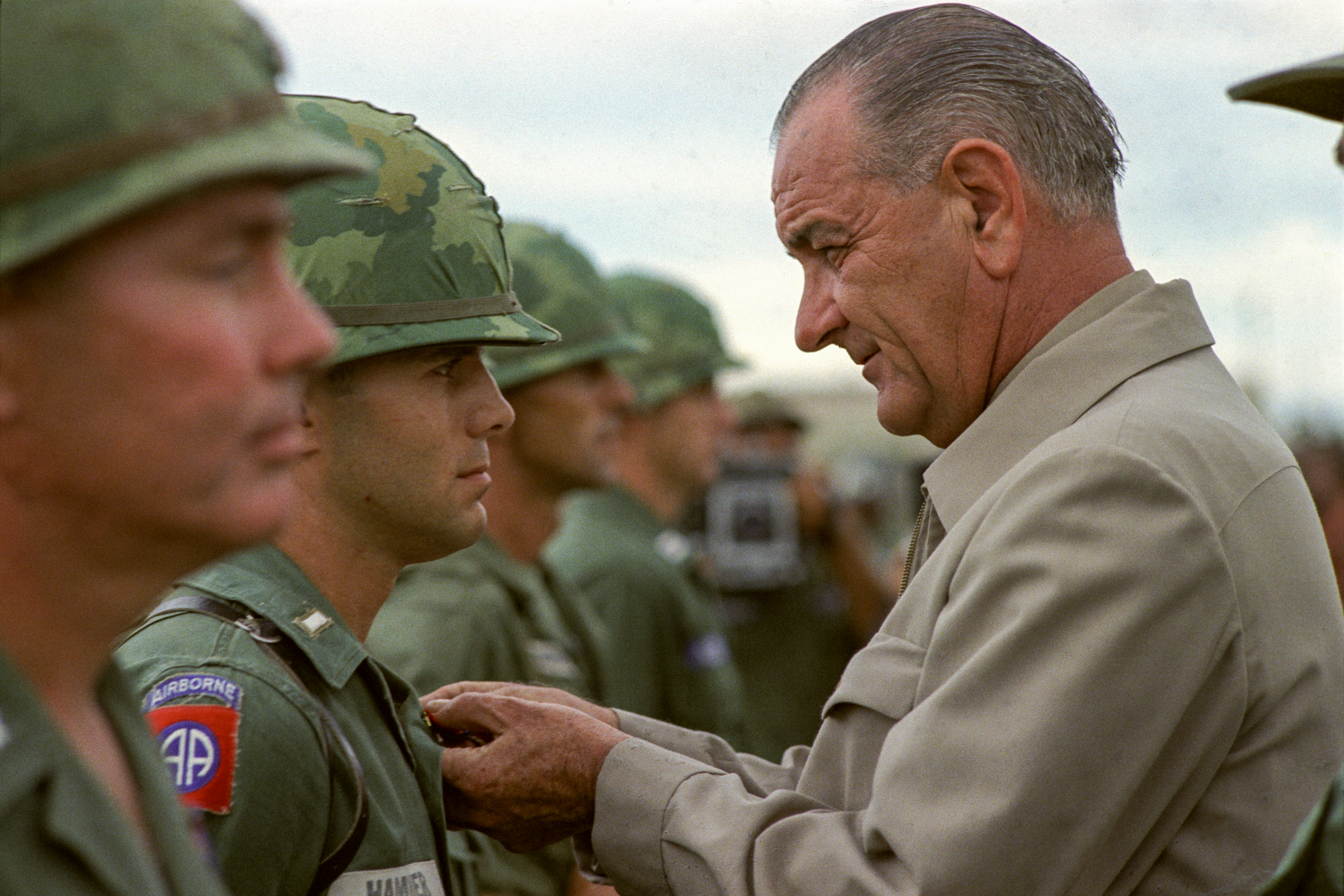
October 26, 1966: LBJ in Vietnam

- U.S. President Johnson stopped briefly in South Vietnam after the conclusion of a summit meeting in the Philippines. Air Force One landed at the Cam Ranh Base in an unannounced visit, and Johnson spent almost two and a half hours addressing American troops, then personally presenting medals, including 24 Purple Hearts to wounded men at the base hospital.
- After resolutions by both Houses of the British Parliament, the Secretary of State for Wales appointed a tribunal to inquire into the causes of and circumstances relating to the Aberfan disaster, chaired by Lord Justice Edmund Davies.
- The 15-member North Atlantic Council voted unanimously to move NATO headquarters from Paris to Brussels, giving up its $9,000,000 building after only six years.
- Major-General Léonard Mulamba was removed from his post as Prime Minister of the Democratic Republic of the Congo by President Mobutu.
- Born: Judge Jules, award-winning British dance music DJ; in London
- Died: Alma Cogan, 34, English pop music singer died of ovarian cancer

== October 27, 1966 (Thursday) ==
- Erich Mende resigned his post as Vice-Chancellor of West Germany. Mende, the Chairman of the Free Democratic Party, quit along with three other FDP members, Finance Minister Rolf Dahlgruen, Economic Cooperation Minister (and future president) Walter Scheel, and Housing Minister Ewald Bucher. The four were all part of the coalition that made up the second Cabinet of Chancellor Ludwig Erhard, leaving Erhard of the Christian Democratic Union with a minority government. Hans-Christoph Seebohm was appointed to succeed Mende. Chancellor Erhard himself, unable to form an acceptable government, would resign on November 30.
- The United Nations General Assembly voted, 114–2, to end the South African Mandate over the former German colony of South West Africa, with the two "no" votes coming from South Africa and from Portugal, whose colony of Angola bordered the Mandate territory. France and the United Kingdom abstained. The post of United Nations Commissioner for South-West Africa was established, and Anton Vratuša would be the first office holder, unable to administer the colony, however, because South Africa maintained that the U.N. had no right to interfere with the 1920 decision of the defunct League of Nations.
- In the United States, the CBS television network premiered It's the Great Pumpkin, Charlie Brown as a Halloween-themed animated presentation based on the comic strip Peanuts. The popular cartoon special has been shown annually since then during the last week in October, for 35 years on CBS, and (since 2001) on the ABC network.
- Walt Disney recorded his final filmed appearance prior to his death, detailing his plans for Epcot, a utopian planned city to be built in Florida. After his death less than two months later, the original concept would be scrapped and Epcot would become an amusement park.
- Born:
  - Matt Drudge, American political commentator who created The Drudge Report; in Takoma Park, Maryland
  - Kit Malthouse, British politician who served as Secretary of State for Education for seven weeks in 2022; in Liverpool
- Died: Barry Faulkner, 85, American mural painter

== October 28, 1966 (Friday) ==
- The People's Republic of China announced, through its official Xinhua News Agency, that it claimed sovereignty over territory within the independent Buddhist Kingdom of Bhutan. According to the Chinese announcement, the fertile Dong Nang grasslands at the base of the Himalayan Mountains were owned by China and Bhutanese farmers who used the land for cattle grazing would have to pay taxes to the Beijing government.
- An investigation was started by the U.S. Federal Trade Commission (FTC) of games of chance sponsored by supermarkets, including "supermarket bingo" and sweepstakes, in order to determine whether the contests were illegal, unwinnable, or had increased food prices. The FTC called on grocery stores to voluntarily eliminate "any practices that are unfair or deceptive or that unjustifiably add to the American housewife's grocery bill."
- Born: Steve Atwater, American NFL defensive back; in Chicago
- Died: Robert Charpentier, 50, French cyclist who won three gold medals at the 1936 Summer Olympics in Berlin

== October 29, 1966 (Saturday) ==
- Guinea's Foreign Minister Joseph Ankrah and 18 other people, all en route to the Organization of African Unity (OAU) meeting in Ethiopia, were removed from a Pan American World Airways flight when it made a stop in Accra, the capital of Ghana. The delegates were detained as prisoners by the government, which said that it was retaliating for Guinea's imprisonment of Ghanaian citizens. The U.S. Ambassador to the African nation of Guinea, Robinson McIlvaine, was placed under house arrest at his residence in Conakry, in retaliation Ankrah's imprisonment. The Guinean government charged that McIlvaine and the United States were responsible for the Ghana incident. The OAU and the Ethiopian Justice Minister would mediate the confrontation. McIlvaine was released and the 19 prisoners would be released on November 5, after it was determined that none of the alleged prisoners in Guinea wished to return to Ghana.
- Less than three months after its launch on August 10, Lunar Orbiter 1 was deliberately pulled out of orbit by NASA Ground Control, and crashed into the Moon. The NASA decision, which came even as the Soviet lunar orbiter, Luna 12, was sending back photographs to the USSR, was done in order to avoid interference with the Lunar Orbiter 2 probe that would launch on November 6. The crash was accomplished by transmitting a command to fire a retrorocket that slowed the probe's speed from 2,150 to 1,750 miles per hour, causing a sufficient loss of momentum to make the vehicle glide to an impact on the far side of the Moon. Regarding all four Lunar Orbiters, a historian would write later, "With a total cost of the entire project at $163 million, they were almost certainly the world's most expensive disposable cameras."
- The National Organization for Women (NOW) was officially incorporated during its first national conference, held in Washington, D.C., and adopted a preamble that declared its purpose to be "to take action to bring women into full participation in the mainstream of American society now, exercising all the privileges and responsibilities thereof in truly equal partnership with men."
- The first regeneration of Doctor Who took place, as the Doctor's face changed from that of actor William Hartnell to that of his successor, Patrick Troughton. Hartnell, at 58, was supposedly exhausted from the production schedule, so in the story, The Tenth Planet, the Doctor remarked "This old body of mine is wearing a bit thin," and collapsed. With the aid of a slow mix and dissolve, the closeup view of Hartnell's face was gradually replaced by that of the 46-year-old Troughton.
- Valued at half a million U.S. dollars, the Antonio da Correggio painting Madonna and Child with the infant Saint John the Baptist was stolen from the Art Institute of Chicago. Seventeen hours later, an anonymous phone call was made to the Institute, and the 450-year-old painting, wrapped in brown paper and tied with a string, was found in a wastebasket downtown, with moderate but permanent damage.
- Queen Elizabeth II of the United Kingdom and her consort Prince Philip, Duke of Edinburgh, visited Aberfan to pay their respects to those who died in the disaster.
- Celtic defeated Rangers, 1–0, to win the 1966 Scottish League Cup Final, held at Hampden Park in Glasgow in front of 94,532 spectators.
- A penumbral lunar eclipse took place.
- Died: Jocelyn Brooke, 57, English author best known of the "Orchid Trilogy" of books, which he started with 1948's The Military Orchid

== October 30, 1966 (Sunday) ==
- Cheri Jo Bates, an 18-year old freshman at Riverside Community College in southern California, was brutally murdered after leaving the campus library at closing time. When her body was found the next morning, she had been "slashed three times in the chest, once in the back, and seven times in her throat" with wounds "so extensive that she was nearly decapitated". An anonymous letter, claiming responsibility for the killing, would be received by city police on November 29, with the warning that Bates "is not the first and she will not be the last". The form of the murders, and the wording of the letters, were similar enough to that of the Zodiac Killer that Bates would be considered to have likely been his first victim.
- The Montreal Alouettes defeated the Ottawa Rough Riders 1–0 in the lowest-scoring game in Canadian Football League history and a record for modern pro football history. The Als' score came when kicker Peter Kempf attempted a 25-yard field goal and the wind sent the ball wide; the Riders' Don Gilbert fell on the missed kick in the end zone, which gave Montreal a single point under CFL rules. A previous 1–0 game had happened in 1949, before the CFL was founded by a merger of two leagues.
- Born:
  - Abu Musab al-Zarqawi, Jordanian-born Sunni militant and operative for al-Qaeda, who coordinated suicide bombings against U.S. forces and Shi'ite Muslims; in Zarqa, Jordan (killed in air raid, 2006)
  - Cheryl Grimmer, a three-year-old Australian toddler who was kidnapped from Fairy Meadow Beach in Wollongong, New South Wales, on January 12, 1970; in Knowle, Bristol, England
  - Zoran Milanović, President of Croatia since 2020 and former Prime Minister of Croatia from 2011 to 2016; in Zagreb, SR Croatia, Yugoslavia
- Died:
  - Dr. Smiley Blanton, 84, American psychiatrist who, along with the Reverend Norman Vincent Peale, created the profession of pastoral counseling, an integration of psychiatry and religion. They co-founded the Religio-Psychiatric Clinic in 1937, and later the American Foundation of Religion and Psychiatry, as well as authoring Faith Is the Answer: A Psychiatrist and a Pastor Discuss Your Problems and The Art of Real Happiness.
  - John Drainie, 50, Canadian radio and television actor who was dubbed, by Orson Welles, as "the greatest radio actor in the world" for the lead role in Jake and the Kid, died of cancer.
  - Bill Farnsworth, 79, Australian rugby and cricket star

== October 31, 1966 (Monday) ==
- A footlocker, containing the materials from the 1963 autopsy of U.S. President John F. Kennedy, was brought to the National Archives Building following an authorization by the Kennedy family, and opened in the presence of the officials from the Archives, the Government Services Administration, and the U.S. Department of Justice, on condition that the contents not be available for five years. When an inventory was made, eight of the nine sets of items were available, the stainless steel container that had contained Kennedy's brain was found to be empty. Explanations differ, with some authors believing it to be part of the coverup of a conspiracy, the custodian, Burke Marshall would testify in 1978 that the brain tissue was disposed of by Attorney General Robert F. Kennedy in order to prevent it from being "placed on public display in future years in an institution such as the Smithsonian."
- Staff Sergeant Herbert W. Boeckenhaupt, a 23-year old U.S. Air Force noncommissioned officer, was arrested at March Air Force Base in California, where he worked as a communications repairman and had top secret clearance. After the FBI presented evidence that he had conspired to deliver national defense secrets to Soviet Embassy counselor Aleksey R. Malinin, Boeckenhaupt would be convicted of espionage and sentenced to 30 years in federal prison and Malinin would be expelled from the United States. He was ordered to be released from prison by a Federal Judge for the Middle District of Pennsylvania in March 1978 after a writ of habeas corpus was filed, and granted, that he was being held improperly for non-statutory reasons. The Court granted the petition for release. The government did not appeal the decision.
- John Paul Chase, a henchman in the U.S. gangs of Baby Face Nelson, John Dillinger and Alvin Karpis during the 1930s, was paroled from Leavenworth Federal Prison after 30 years. He had been convicted in 1935 of the murder of FBI Agent Samuel Cowley. Chase, 64 years old, would spend the last years of his life as a janitor in California before dying of cancer on October 5, 1973.
- U.S. President Johnson, on his first visit to Malaysia, stopped at Kampung Labu Jaya village in Negeri Sembilan state. The village would rename itself Kampung L.B. Johnson in honor of the 36th American president.
- The Delhi High Court was established, with four judges.
- Born: Ad-Rock (stage name for Adam Keefe Horovitz), American guitarist and co-founder of the hip hop trio the Beastie Boys; in Manhattan
