= Anthony Bourne-Arton =

British politician

Anthony Temple Bourne-Arton (1 March 1913 – 28 May 1996) was a British Conservative Party politician.

He was elected at the 1959 general election as Member of Parliament for Darlington, following the retirement of the Conservative MP Fergus Graham. Bourne-Arton served for only one parliament, losing his seat at the 1964 general election to Labour's Edward Fletcher. He subsequently lost the 1966 general election and the 1970 general election to Fletcher.

He was educated at Clifton College. He took on the name Arton as a condition of his marriage.

Parliament of the United Kingdom
Preceded by Fergus Graham	Member of Parliament for Darlington; 1959–1964	Succeeded by Edward Fletcher
