= Donald L. Grunsky =

American politician (1915–2000)

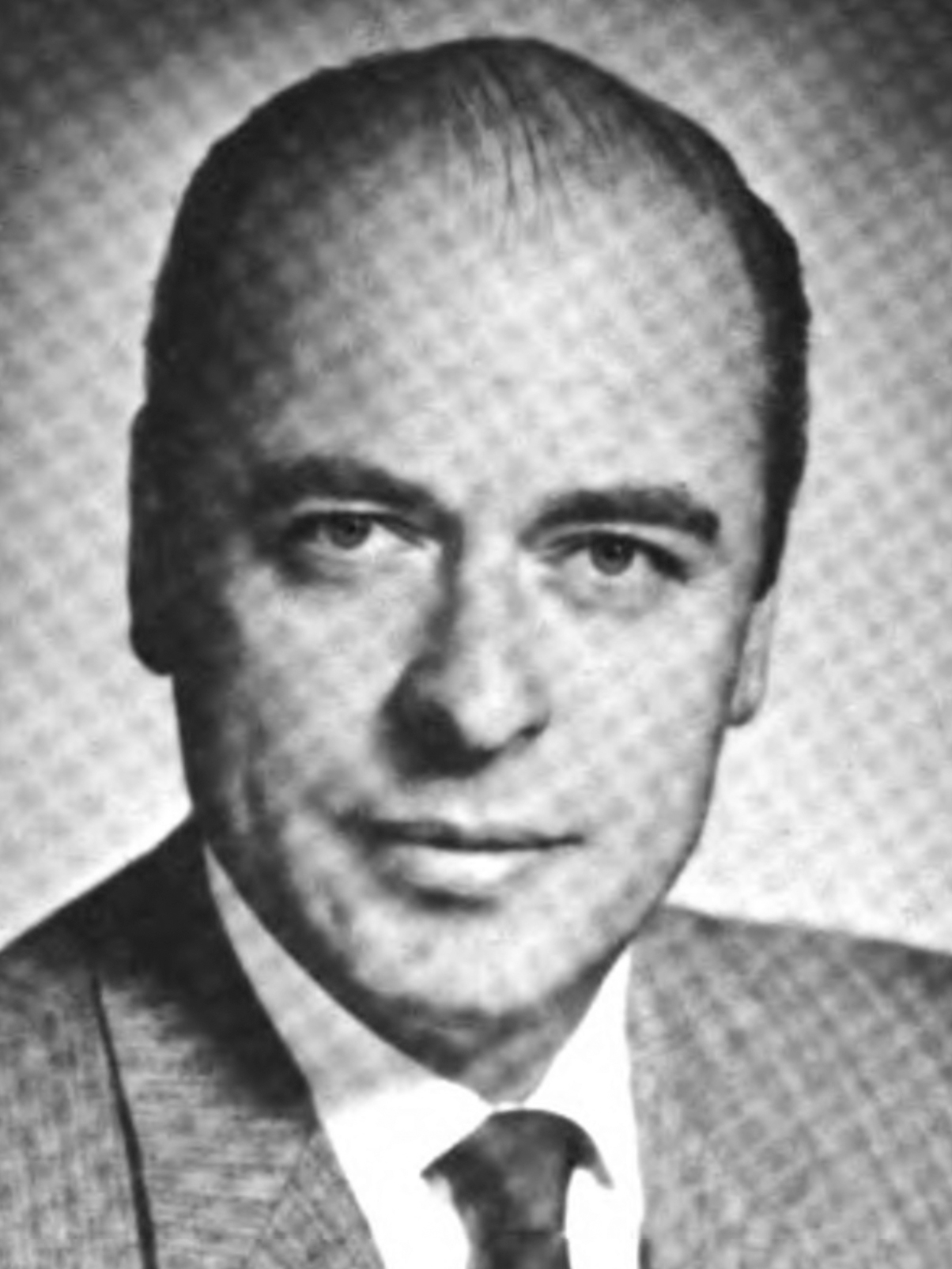
- Official portrait, 1971

Member of the California State Senate
- In office January 5, 1953 – November 30, 1976
- Preceded by: H. R. Judah
- Succeeded by: Bob Nimmo
- Constituency: 23rd district (1953–1967); 17th district (1967–1976)

Member of the California State Assembly from the 32nd district
- In office January 6, 1947 – January 5, 1953
- Preceded by: Jacob M. Leonard
- Succeeded by: Wallace Henderson

Personal details
- Born: October 19, 1915 San Francisco, California
- Died: January 13, 2000 (aged 84) Santa Cruz, California
- Party: Republican
- Spouse: Mary Lou

Military service
- Branch/service: United States Navy
- Battles/wars: World War II

Donald Lucius Grunsky (October 19, 1915 – January 13, 2000) served in the California State Assembly for the 32nd district from 1947 to 1953, and served in the California State Senate for the 23rd and 17th district from 1953 to 1976. A member of the Republican Party, during World War II he also served in the United States Navy.

== Early life ==
Grunsky was born October 19, 1915 in San Francisco.

He served in World War II in the United States Navy.

== Career ==
He served in the California State Assembly for the 32nd district from 1947 to 1953, and served in the California State Senate for the 23rd and 17th district from 1953 to 1976.

Grunsky is best known for having sponsored the legislation that made the hallucinogen LSD illegal. After California became the first state to ban the drug, effective October 6, 1966, other states followed suit and the U.S. federal government included LSD as one of its Schedule I drugs under the Controlled Substances Act of 1970.

== Personal life ==
He married Mary Lou.

== Death ==
He died on January 13, 2000 in Santa Cruz.
