= 1967 Cardiff City Council election =

Local election in Cardiff, Wales

The 1967 Cardiff City Council election was held on Thursday 11 May 1967 to elect councillors to Cardiff City Council in Cardiff, Glamorgan, Wales. It took place on the same day as several other county borough elections in Wales and England.

The previous elections to this one were in May 1966 and the next elections would be in May 1968.

The election saw the Conservatives taking a significant number of seats back from the Labour Party, as well as winning every new seat.

== Background ==
Cardiff County Borough Council had been created in 1889. Cardiff became a city in 1905. Elections to the local authority were held annually, though not all council seats were included in each contest, because each of the three councillors in each ward stood down for election in rotation.

The council also comprised aldermen who were elected for a six-year period by the councillors.

The local government elections took place in the context of Harold Wilson's Labour UK government struggling with cabinet splits over their plans to join the European Common Market.

== New wards ==
Two new Cardiff electoral wards of Rhiwbina and Whitchurch were created for this election, following the transfer of these areas from Cardiff Rural.

Three councillors were elected for each of these wards at this election, increasing the numbers on Cardiff City Council by six. Because each of the three councillors in every ward stood down for re-election in rotation, the winners of the Rhiwbina/Whitchurch polls would sit for three years before standing down, the second placed candidates would sit for two years and the third-placed candidates would need to stand for re-election in 12 months time.

== Overview of the result ==
Twenty-three seats in 19 electoral wards were up for election in May 1967. In a "landslide election" the Conservative Party gained their biggest ever majority on the council, taking 4 seats off the Labour Party, one of the Liberals and winning all six new seats in Rhiwbina and Whitchurch. Gains included the traditionally Labour seat in the South ward, taken by 36 votes. Labour group leader, Alderman Lyons, blamed Independent candidates splitting the Labour vote. The council gained its first ever black councillor, Manuel Delgado, in the Splott ward. It also gained a brother and sister combination, with Trevor Tyrell joining his sister, Bella Brown, in the Canton Ward.

Plaid Cymru were fielding a large number of candidates for the first time in Cardiff and polled well in Plasmawr and the two new Rhiwbina/Whitchurch wards.

=== Council composition ===
Immediately following the election the Conservatives had a majority of 18 on the council, though after aldermanic elections the balance on the city council was expected to be 50 Conservatives and 26 Labour representatives. 11 Conservative aldermen were elected on 22 May, with the two Labour aldermen standing for re-election losing their places. Conservative alderman Layton Lougher was also replaced.

== Ward results ==
Contests took place in every ward at this election. In most wards one council seat was up for election, but in Rhiwbina and Whitchurch three seats were available.

=== Adamsdown ===
Adamsdown ward 1967
| Party | Candidate | Votes | % | ±% |
|---|---|---|---|---|
| Labour | (Alderman) J. P. Keohane | 1,261 | | |
| Conservative | Lionel Pugh | 762 | | |
| Liberal | Harry Edwards | 251 | | |
| Plaid Cymru | Bran Evans | 234 | | |
| Majority | | 499 | | |
| Labour hold | | Swing | | |

=== Canton ===
Canton ward 1967
| Party | Candidate | Votes | % | ±% |
|---|---|---|---|---|
| Conservative | Trevor Tyrell | 1,948 | | |
| Labour | Olwen Parry * | 1,393 | | |
| Independent | Reg Stuart | 313 | | |
| Majority | | 555 | | |
| Conservative gain from Labour | | Swing | | |

=== Cathays ===
Cathays ward 1967
| Party | Candidate | Votes | % | ±% |
|---|---|---|---|---|
| Conservative | Bernard Bateman | 2,188 | | |
| Labour | John C. Edwards * | 2,005 | | |
| Liberal | Vernon White | 459 | | |
| Plaid Cymru | John Howell | 318 | | |
| Majority | | 183 | | |
| Conservative gain from Labour | | Swing | | |

=== Central ===
Central ward 1967
| Party | Candidate | Votes | % | ±% |
|---|---|---|---|---|
| Conservative | Mary Hallinan * | 1,809 | | |
| Labour | Robert Dumbleton | 921 | | |
| Majority | | 888 | | |
| Conservative hold | | Swing | | |

=== Ely ===
Ely ward 1967
| Party | Candidate | Votes | % | ±% |
|---|---|---|---|---|
| Labour | William H. Carling * | 2,118 | | |
| Conservative | Keith Clode | 1,481 | | |
| Majority | | 637 | | |
| Labour hold | | Swing | | |

=== Gabalfa ===
Gabalfa ward 1967
| Party | Candidate | Votes | % | ±% |
|---|---|---|---|---|
| Labour | Emrys Pride * | 2,117 | | |
| Conservative | Wyndham Powell | 2,052 | | |
| Majority | | 65 | | |
| Labour hold | | Swing | | |

=== Grangetown ===
Grangetown ward 1967
| Party | Candidate | Votes | % | ±% |
|---|---|---|---|---|
| Conservative | Robert McCourtney | 1,457 | | |
| Labour | Albert Horle * | 1,263 | | |
| Independent | Maxwell Christie | 768 | | |
| Majority | | 194 | | |
| Conservative gain from Labour | | Swing | | |

=== Llandaff ===
Llandaff ward 1967
| Party | Candidate | Votes | % | ±% |
|---|---|---|---|---|
| Conservative | Julius Hermer * | 3,035 | | |
| Plaid Cymru | John B. Hilling | 766 | | |
| Labour | J. May | 628 | | |
| Majority | | 2,407 | | |
| Conservative hold | | Swing | | |

=== Llanishen ===
Llanishen ward 1967
| Party | Candidate | Votes | % | ±% |
|---|---|---|---|---|
| Conservative | Harvey Salter * | 4,074 | | |
| Labour | (Mrs) J. Southern | 1,673 | | |
| Majority | | 2,401 | | |
| Conservative hold | | Swing | | |

=== Penylan ===
Penylan ward 1967
| Party | Candidate | Votes | % | ±% |
|---|---|---|---|---|
| Conservative | F. W. Jones * | 4,919 | | |
| Labour | R. Frew | 842 | | |
| Majority | | 4,077 | | |
| Conservative hold | | Swing | | |

=== Plasmawr ===
Plasmawr ward 1967
| Party | Candidate | Votes | % | ±% |
|---|---|---|---|---|
| Labour | Hubert Harding * | 1,974 | | |
| Conservative | Peter Meyer | 1,531 | | |
| Plaid Cymru | Dafydd Hughes | 1,024 | | |
| Majority | | 443 | | |
| Labour hold | | Swing | | |

=== Plasnewydd ===
Plasnewydd ward 1967
| Party | Candidate | Votes | % | ±% |
|---|---|---|---|---|
| Conservative | Olwen Watkin * | 2,475 | | |
| Labour | W. J. Philips | 912 | | |
| Plaid Cymru | E. I. Rowlands | 373 | | |
| Liberal | Queenie O'Neill | 250 | | |
| Communist | Thomas Southern | ^{[a]} | | |
| Majority | | 1,563 | | |
| Conservative gain from Liberal | | Swing | | |

Olwen Watkin had won the previous election for the Liberal Party.

=== Rhiwbina ===
Rhiwbina ward 1967
| Party | Candidate | Votes | % | ±% |
|---|---|---|---|---|
| Conservative | Martin Davies | 3,531 | | |
| Conservative | William Bain | 3,497 | | |
| Conservative | William Davies | 3,096 | | |
| Plaid Cymru | John Bevan | 1,264 | | |
| Plaid Cymru | Gwilym Hughes | 1,228 | | |
| Labour | (Alderman) F. G. Davies | 1,030 | | |
| Labour | (Mrs) S. Williams | 996 | | |
| Labour | C. Roderick | 880 | | |
| Liberal | Raymond Stephens | 534 | | |
| Majority | | 1,832 | | |
| Conservative win (new seat) | | | | |
| Conservative win (new seat) | | | | |
| Conservative win (new seat) | | | | |

=== Riverside ===
Riverside ward 1967
| Party | Candidate | Votes | % | ±% |
|---|---|---|---|---|
| Conservative | David Purnell * | 2,094 | | |
| Labour | David Seligman | 1,019 | | |
| Majority | | 1,075 | | |
| Conservative hold | | Swing | | |

=== Roath ===
Roath ward 1967
| Party | Candidate | Votes | % | ±% |
|---|---|---|---|---|
| Conservative | Ronald Richards * | 3,379 | | |
| Labour | (Dr) A. Jenkins | 861 | | |
| Majority | | 2,518 | | |
| Conservative hold | | Swing | | |

=== Rumney ===
Rumney ward 1967
| Party | Candidate | Votes | % | ±% |
|---|---|---|---|---|
| Labour | J. N. Rees * | 2,570 | | |
| Conservative | Joan Taylor | 1,477 | | |
| Majority | | 93 | | |
| Labour hold | | Swing | | |

=== South ===
South ward 1967
| Party | Candidate | Votes | % | ±% |
|---|---|---|---|---|
| Conservative | Terry Roche | 1,622 | | |
| Labour | H. G. Bartlett * | 1,586 | | |
| Majority | | 36 | | |
| Conservative gain from Labour | | Swing | | |

=== Splott ===
Splott ward 1967
| Party | Candidate | Votes | % | ±% |
|---|---|---|---|---|
| Labour | Manuel Delgado | 2,167 | | |
| Conservative | Ian Hermer | 1,737 | | |
| Plaid Cymru | Donald Nicholson | 704 | | |
| Liberal | Stan Sheriff | 187 | | |
| Majority | | 430 | | |
| Labour hold | | Swing | | |

Manuel Delgado became Cardiff's first ever black councillor.

=== Whitchurch ===
Whitchurch ward 1967
| Party | Candidate | Votes | % | ±% |
|---|---|---|---|---|
| Conservative | George E. Brown | 3,350 | | |
| Conservative | Jack Davies | 3,264 | | |
| Conservative | Rose Thomas | 3,061 | | |
| Liberal | George Parsons | 1,451 | | |
| Labour | A. G. Donne | 1,386 | | |
| Plaid Cymru | Hugh Edwards | 1,244 | | |
| Labour | E. Edwards | 1,098 | | |
| Labour | B. A. Matthewson | 980 | | |
| Majority | | 1,610 | | |
| Conservative win (new seat) | | | | |
| Conservative win (new seat) | | | | |
| Conservative win (new seat) | | | | |

* = 'retiring' ward councillor for re-election
[a] = vote figure missing from results
