= 1966 Edinburgh Corporation election =

Local election in Scotland

- 3 May 1966

23 of the 69 seats to the Edinburgh Corporation 35 seats needed for a majority
	First party	Second party	Third party
Party	Progressives	Labour	Liberal
Last election	35	32	2
Seats won	14	9	0
Seats after	36	32	1
Seat change	▲1	Steady	▼1
Popular vote	42,397	40,581	9,751
Percentage	43.6%	41.7%	10.0%
- Results by ward.
Council control before election
Progressives
Council control after election
Progressives

An election to the Edinburgh Corporation was held on 3 May 1966, alongside municipal elections across Scotland. Of the councils 69 seats, 23 were up for election.

After the election, Edinburgh Corporation was composed of 36 Progressives, 33 Labour councillors, and 1 Liberal. The Progressives increased their majority to three seats.

== Aggregate results ==
Edinburgh Corporation election, 1966
Party	Seats	Gains	Losses	Net gain/loss	Seats %	Votes %	Votes	+/−
Progressives	14	1	0	▲1	60.9	43.6	42,397	
Labour	9	0	0	Steady	39.1	41.7	40,581	
Liberal	0	0	1	▼1	0.0	10.0	9,751	
Conservative	0	0	0	Steady	0.0	3.5	3,363	
SNP	0	0	0	Steady	0.0	0.7	661	
Communist	0	0	0	Steady	0.0	0.5	515	

== Ward results ==
Location of Broughton ward

Broughton
Party	Candidate	Votes	%
Progressives	Melville Dinwiddie	Unopposed	
Progressives hold			

Location of Calton ward

Calton
Party	Candidate	Votes	%
Progressives	Josephine M. Dickson	2,571	
Labour	Charles R. Stuart	2,489	
Majority		82	
Progressives hold			

Location of Central Leith ward

Central Leith
Party	Candidate	Votes	%
Labour	John A. Crichton	2,182	
Progressives	Victor J. Syme	591	
SNP	Mary G. Thomson	262	
Communist	Theodore C. Taylor	40	
Majority		1,591	
Labour hold			

Location of Colinton ward

Colinton
Party	Candidate	Votes	%
Progressives	Maurice F. Ferry	4,911	
Labour	Eva Gibbons	2,301	
Majority		2,610	
Progressives hold			

Location of Corstorphine ward

Corstorphine
Party	Candidate	Votes	%
Progressives	Mary Robertson Murray	4,280	
Liberal	Margaret K. Taylor	2,788	
Majority		1,422	
Progressives hold			

Location of Craigentinny ward

Craigentinny
Party	Candidate	Votes	%
Labour	Alexander Sutherland	3,396	
Progressives	Rupert Spoyer	1,924	
Majority		1,472	
Labour hold			

Location of Craigmillar ward

Craigmillar
Party	Candidate	Votes	%
Labour	Russell A. Fer	2,723	
Communist	Michael d'Arcy	298	
Majority		2,425	
Labour hold			

Location of George Square ward

George Square
Party	Candidate	Votes	%
Progressives	Clive F. Murphy	2,266	
Labour	George Foulkes	1,084	
Majority		1,182	
Progressives hold			

Location of Gorgie-Dalry ward

Gorgie-Dalry
Party	Candidate	Votes	%
Labour	Thomas McGregor	2,596	
Liberal	George F. Smith	1,139	
Majority		1,457	
Labour hold			

Location of Holyrood ward

Holyrood
Party	Candidate	Votes	%
Labour	Owen Hand	1,629	
Liberal	Roberts E. Bell	567	
Conservative	James L. Walls	501	
Communist	Martin E. Currie	44	
Majority		1,062	
Labour hold			

Location of Liberton ward

Liberton
Party	Candidate	Votes	%
Labour	Frederick M. Lawson	4,453	
Conservative	James S. Gordon	2,862	
Majority		1,591	
Labour hold			

Location of Merchiston ward

Merchiston
Party	Candidate	Votes	%
Progressives	Thomas Morgan	3,171	
Liberal	Bethia L. Howden	2,025	
Majority		1,146	
Progressives hold			

Location of Morningside ward

Morningside
Party	Candidate	Votes	%
Progressives	John Bateman	Unopposed	
Progressives hold			

Location of Murrayfield-Cramond ward

Murrayfield-Cramond
Party	Candidate	Votes	%
Progressives	Hugh Macpherson	5,294	
Labour	David Millar	2,040	
Majority		3,254	
Progressives hold			

Location of Newington ward

Newington
Party	Candidate	Votes	%
Progressives	John D. Kidd	3,605	
Liberal	Hilda S. Morton	3,232	
Labour	Donald E. S. Truman	1,405	
Majority		373	
Progressives gain from Liberal			

Location of Pilton ward

Pilton
Party	Candidate	Votes	%
Labour	Robert W. Irvine	2,977	
Progressives	Anthony H. Lester	643	
SNP	George B. Stewart	399	
Communist	Charles McManus	133	
Majority		2,334	
Labour hold			

Location of Portobello ward

Portobello
Party	Candidate	Votes	%
Progressives	Kenneth W. Borthwick	3,776	
Labour	Ronald D. M. Brown	1,897	
Majority		1,879	
Progressives hold			

Location of Sighthill ward

Sighthill
Party	Candidate	Votes	%
Labour	William Wallace	3,922	
Progressives	Richard K. Aitken	1,172	
Labour hold			

Location of South Leith

South Leith
Party	Candidate	Votes	%
Labour	Shelia King Murray	3,077	
Progressives	Thomas S. Ramage	2,719	
Majority		358	
Labour hold			

Location of St Andrews ward

St. Andrews
Party	Candidate	Votes	%
Progressives	Robert McLaughlin	1,664	
Labour	Phyllis Herriot	772	
Majority		892	
Progressives hold			

Location of St Bernards ward

St. Bernards
Party	Candidate	Votes	%
Labour	David A. Adamson	Unopposed	
Labour hold			

Location of St Giles ward

St. Giles
Party	Candidate	Votes	%
Labour	James McInally	Unopposed	
Labour hold			

Location of West Leith ward

West Leith
Party	Candidate	Votes	%
Progressives	William R. W. Lyle	3,810	
Labour	Henry D. Crawford	1,638	
Majority		2,177	
Progressives hold			
