= 1966 Colombian parliamentary election =

Parliamentary elections were held in Colombia on 20 March 1966 to elect the Senate and Chamber of Representatives. Under the National Front agreement, only the Conservative Party and the Liberal Party were allowed to contest the elections, with each party allocated 50% of the seats in both houses. As a result, the main contest at the elections was between factions within each party.

== Results ==
=== Senate ===
Party and faction		Votes	%	Seats	+/–
Colombian; Liberal; Party	Oficialistas	1,120,394	38.51	46	+9
Colombian; Liberal; Party	Liberal Revolutionary Movement (soft)	367,457	12.63	7	–
Colombian; Liberal; Party	National Popular Alliance	10,283	0.35	0	–
Colombian; Liberal; Party	Others	347	0.01	0	–
Colombian; Liberal; Party	Independents	31,009	1.07	0	–
Colombian; Liberal; Party	Total	1,529,490	52.57	53	+4
Colombian; Conservative; Party	National Popular Alliance	474,489	16.31	18	+16
Colombian; Conservative; Party	Unionistas	472,876	16.25	20	–11
Colombian; Conservative; Party	Lauro-Alzatistas	339,809	11.68	14	New
Colombian; Conservative; Party	Leyvistas	6,984	0.24	0	–
Colombian; Conservative; Party	Others	3,960	0.14	0	–
Colombian; Conservative; Party	Independents	81,586	2.80	1	+1
Colombian; Conservative; Party	Total	1,379,704	47.43	53	+4
Total		2,909,194	100.00	106	+8
Valid votes		2,909,194	99.70		
Invalid/blank votes		8,669	0.30		
Total votes		2,917,863	100.00		
Registered voters/turnout		6,609,639	44.15		
Source: Nohlen

=== Chamber of Representatives ===
Party and faction		Votes	%	Seats	+/–
Colombian; Liberal; Party	Oficialistas	1,120,824	38.26	69	+10
Colombian; Liberal; Party	Liberal Revolutionary Movement (soft)	369,956	12.63	21	–2
Colombian; Liberal; Party	National Popular Alliance	100,898	3.44	4	+3
Colombian; Liberal; Party	Others	14,940	0.51	0	–
Colombian; Liberal; Party	Independents	24,026	0.82	1	+1
Colombian; Liberal; Party	Total	1,630,644	55.67	95	+3
Colombian; Conservative; Party	Unionistas	474,397	16.20	35	–
Colombian; Conservative; Party	National Popular Alliance	422,204	14.41	33	+7
Colombian; Conservative; Party	Lauro-Alzatistas	346,664	11.83	25	New
Colombian; Conservative; Party	Leyvistas	7,485	0.26	1	+1
Colombian; Conservative; Party	Others	7,771	0.27	0	–
Colombian; Conservative; Party	Independents	40,106	1.37	1	+1
Colombian; Conservative; Party	Total	1,298,627	44.33	95	+3
Total		2,929,271	100.00	190	+6
Valid votes		2,929,271	99.66		
Invalid/blank votes		9,951	0.34		
Total votes		2,939,222	100.00		
Registered voters/turnout		6,609,639	44.47		
Source: Nohlen
