= 1966 Salford City Council election =

Local election in Salford

- 12 May 1966

16 of 64 seats on Salford City Council 33 seats needed for a majority
	First party	Second party	Third party
Party	Labour	Conservative	Liberal
Last election	11 seats, 48.5%	4 seats, 44.4%	1 seat, 6.0%
Seats before	49	13	2
Seats won	10	5	1
Seats after	48	14	2
Seat change	▼1	▲1	Steady
Popular vote	12,461	11,684	1,391
Percentage	48.4%	45.4%	5.4%
Swing	▼0.1%	▲1.0%	▼0.6%
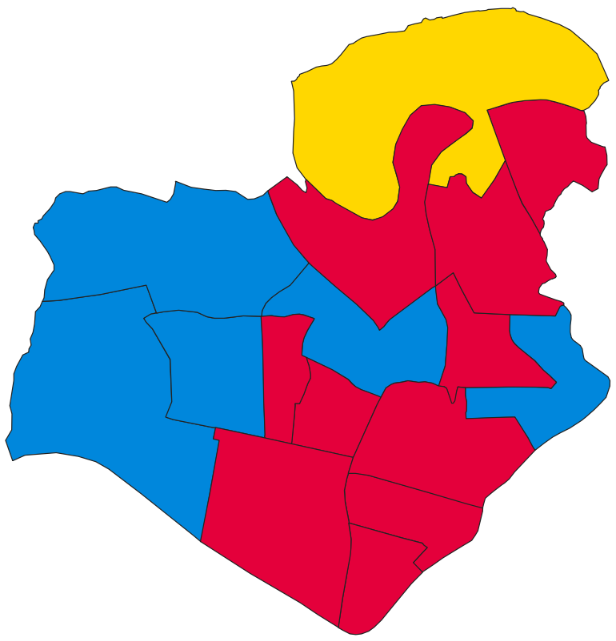
- Map of results of 1966 election
Leader of the Council before election
Labour
Leader of the Council after election
Labour

Elections to Salford City Council were held on Thursday, 12 May 1966. One-third of the councillors seats were up for election, with each successful candidate to serve a three-year term of office. The Labour Party retained overall control of the council.

== Election result ==
Party	Votes		Seats			Full Council	
Labour Party	12,461 (48.4%)	▼0.1	10 (62.5%)	10 / 16	▼1	48 (75.0%)	48 / 64
Conservative Party	11,684 (45.4%)	▲1.0	5 (31.3%)	5 / 16	▲1	14 (21.9%)	14 / 64
Liberal Party	1,391 (5.4%)	▼0.6	1 (6.3%)	1 / 16	Steady	2 (3.1%)	2 / 64
Communist	222 (0.9%)	▼0.1	0 (0.0%)	0 / 16	Steady	0 (0.0%)	0 / 64

=== Full council ===
↓
48	2	14

=== Aldermen ===
↓
16

=== Councillors ===
↓
32	2	14

== Ward results ==
=== Albert Park ===
Albert Park
Party	Candidate	Votes	%	±%
Labour	H. McFarlane*	1,170	65.1	+2.8
Conservative	W. Johnson	628	34.9	−2.8
Majority		542	30.2	+5.6
Turnout		1,798		
Labour hold		Swing		

=== Charlestown ===
Charlestown
Party	Candidate	Votes	%	±%
Labour	P. R. Duffy*	849	65.1	N/A
Conservative	J. Thompson	456	34.9	N/A
Majority		393	30.2	N/A
Turnout		1,305		
Labour hold		Swing		

=== Claremont ===
Claremont
Party	Candidate	Votes	%	±%
Conservative	G. M. Joplin*	2,428	68.6	−1.2
Labour	W. Heathcote	1,112	31.4	+1.2
Majority		1,316	37.2	−2.4
Turnout		3,540		
Conservative hold		Swing		

=== Crescent ===
Crescent
Party	Candidate	Votes	%	±%
Labour	R. Dodd*	274	43.7	−17.7
Liberal	E. J. Hyde	218	34.8	N/A
Conservative	B. Baxter	135	21.5	−17.1
Majority		56	8.9	−13.9
Turnout		627		
Labour hold		Swing		

=== Docks ===
Docks
Party	Candidate	Votes	%	±%
Labour	E. Warburton*	674	50.2	−3.2
Conservative	W. Eddes	605	45.0	+5.0
Communist	T. A. Bentley	64	4.8	−1.8
Majority		69	5.2	−8.2
Turnout		1,343		
Labour hold		Swing		

=== Kersal ===
Kersal
Party	Candidate	Votes	%	±%
Liberal	S. Harris	1,173	40.0	−9.3
Conservative	L. A. Baker	916	31.2	+7.3
Labour	A. C. Casson	843	28.8	+2.0
Majority		257	8.8	−13.7
Turnout		2,932		
Liberal hold		Swing		

=== Langworthy ===
Langworthy
Party	Candidate	Votes	%	±%
Labour	J. Hill*	910	58.6	+4.4
Conservative	L. Scott	643	41.4	−4.4
Majority		267	17.2	+8.8
Turnout		1,553		
Labour hold		Swing		

=== Mandley Park ===
Mandley Park
Party	Candidate	Votes	%	±%
Labour	S. Davies*	1,203	59.8	−6.1
Conservative	A. Boardman	810	40.2	+6.1
Majority		393	19.6	−12.2
Turnout		2,013		
Labour hold		Swing		

=== Ordsall Park ===
Ordsall Park
Party	Candidate	Votes	%	±%
Labour	I. Zott*	691	87.8	+1.9
Communist	A. Moore	96	12.2	−1.9
Majority		595	75.6	+3.8
Turnout		787		
Labour hold		Swing		

=== Regent ===
Regent
Party	Candidate	Votes	%	±%
Labour	L. F. Mossom*	564	63.0	−2.5
Conservative	R. T. Edwards	269	30.1	−0.1
Communist	W. Fallon	62	6.9	+2.7
Majority		295	32.9	−2.5
Turnout		895		
Labour hold		Swing		

=== St. Matthias' ===
St. Matthias'
Party	Candidate	Votes	%	±%
Labour	J. W. Hincks*	807	72.6	+4.6
Conservative	K. Davies	305	27.4	−4.6
Majority		502	45.2	+9.2
Turnout		1,112		
Labour hold		Swing		

=== St. Paul's ===
St. Paul's
Party	Candidate	Votes	%	±%
Labour	H. Williams*	670	58.9	N/A
Conservative	J. N. Jackson	468	41.1	N/A
Majority		202	17.8	N/A
Turnout		1,138		
Labour hold		Swing		

=== St. Thomas' ===
St. Thomas'
Party	Candidate	Votes	%	±%
Conservative	J. A. Broster	512	55.4	+1.9
Labour	T. Cunningham*	412	44.6	−1.9
Majority		100	10.8	+3.8
Turnout		924		
Conservative gain from Labour		Swing		

=== Seedley ===
Seedley
Party	Candidate	Votes	%	±%
Conservative	R. Evans*	1,529	71.5	+13.8
Labour	J. Gaffney	609	28.5	−13.8
Majority		920	43.0	+27.6
Turnout		2,138		
Conservative hold		Swing		

=== Trinity ===
Trinity
Party	Candidate	Votes	%	±%
Conservative	F. I. Fenlon*	460	51.6	+2.6
Labour	J. G. Hughes	432	48.4	−2.6
Majority		28	3.2	
Turnout		892		
Conservative hold		Swing		

=== Weaste ===
Weaste
Party	Candidate	Votes	%	±%
Conservative	J. M. Ford*	1,520	55.1	−1.5
Labour	N. Wright	1,241	44.9	+1.5
Majority		279	10.2	−3.0
Turnout		2,761		
Conservative hold		Swing		
