= 1966 Cardiff City Council election =

Local election in Cardiff, Wales

The 1966 Cardiff City Council election was held on Thursday 12 May 1966 to elect councillors to Cardiff City Council in Cardiff, Glamorgan, Wales. It took place on the same day as several other county borough elections in Wales and England.

The previous elections to this one were in May 1965 and the next elections would be in May 1967.

The election saw the Labour Party lose control of the council to the Conservatives.

== Background ==
Cardiff County Borough Council had been created in 1889. Cardiff became a city in 1905. Elections to the local authority were held annually, though not all council seats were included in each contest, because each of the three councillors in each ward stood down for election in rotation.

The council also included aldermen who were elected for a six-year period by the councillors.

At the 1965 Cardiff election the Conservatives had won seven seats from Labour and the Liberal Party, leaving Labour in control of the City Council as a result of the Lord Mayor's casting vote.

== Overview of the result ==
Seventeen seats in 17 electoral wards were up for election in May 1966. All seats were contested by Labour and the Conservatives, three seats were contested by the Liberals, Independents stood in Grangetown and Gabalfa (where the Tories had won seats in 1965) and a sole Plaid Cymru candidate stood in Splott.

In Grangetown, the sitting Labour councillor Maxwell Christie was deselected by the Cardiff Labour Party, but stood as an Independent Labour candidate.

The Conservatives won two seats from Labour, in Grangetown and Canton, giving them a majority on the Council.

=== Council composition ===
Prior to the election the council had been divided with 34 seats held by Labour and 34 by the Conservatives. By dint of winning two seats, the Conservatives now had a majority of 36 to 32.

== Ward results ==
Contests took place in every ward at this election.

=== Adamsdown ===
Adamsdown ward 1966
Party	Candidate	Votes	%	±%
Labour	John Iorwerth Jones *	1,485		
Conservative	Jeffrey Paul Sainsbury	647		
Liberal	Henry Charles Edwards	483		
Majority		838		
Labour hold		Swing		

=== Canton ===
Canton ward 1966
Party	Candidate	Votes	%	±%
Conservative	William Albert John Adams	1,753		
Labour	George Thomas Cashman *	1,473		
Majority		280		
Conservative gain from Labour		Swing		

=== Cathays ===
Cathays ward 1966
Party	Candidate	Votes	%	±%
Labour	Emyr Currie-Jones *	2,057		
Conservative	Thomas H. Ablett	1,617		
Liberal	George Parsons	1,489		
Majority		440		
Labour hold		Swing		

=== Central ===
Central ward 1966
Party	Candidate	Votes	%	±%
Conservative	Cecil Herbert Rapport *	2,021		
Labour	Manuel C. Delgado	1,149		
Majority		872		
Conservative hold		Swing		

=== Ely ===
Ely ward 1966
Party	Candidate	Votes	%	±%
Labour	Blanche Adelaide McDonald *	1,955		
Conservative	Roger Hambleton	1,265		
Majority		690		
Labour hold		Swing		

=== Gabalfa ===
Gabalfa ward 1966
Party	Candidate	Votes	%	±%
Labour	Gertrude Louise Baines *	1,762		
Conservative	Henry Peter Farthing	1,528		
Independent Labour	John Francis O'Sullivan	546		
Majority		234		
Labour hold		Swing		

=== Grangetown ===
Grangetown ward 1966
Party	Candidate	Votes	%	±%
Conservative	Norman William Henry Leworthy	1,345		
Labour	David Joseph Seligman	1,289		
Independent Labour	Maxwell Christie *	1,147		
Majority		56		
Conservative gain from Labour		Swing		

Councillor Maxwell Christie was deselected by the Cardiff Labour Party, but stood as an Independent Labour candidate. He had been a Grangetown councillor since 1962. The local Labour Party threatened to expel him and his two main supporters.

=== Llandaff ===
Llandaff ward 1966
Party	Candidate	Votes	%	±%
Conservative	(Sir) Charles Hallinan *	3,018		
Labour	Elizabeth Diane Toogood	836		
Majority		2,182		
Conservative hold		Swing		

=== Llanishen ===
Llanishen ward 1966
Party	Candidate	Votes	%	±%
Conservative	Joseph Gerald Gaskell *	3,349		
Labour	William John Phillips	1,375		
Liberal	John Evan Lee	1,086		
Majority		1,974		
Conservative hold		Swing		

=== Penylan ===
Penylan ward 1966
Party	Candidate	Votes	%	±%
Conservative	Gerard Alan Smith Turnbull *	4,295		
Labour	Armour Bernard Matthewson	920		
Majority		3,375		
Conservative hold		Swing		

=== Plasmawr ===
Plasmawr ward 1966
Party	Candidate	Votes	%	±%
Labour	William Campbell-Belfour	2,096		
Conservative	Robert Clive Mogridge	1,447		
Majority		649		
Labour hold		Swing		

=== Plasnewydd ===
Plasnewydd ward 1966
Party	Candidate	Votes	%	±%
Labour	Margaret Sylvia Jacobs *	1,928		
Conservative	Desmond Griffith Rees	1,748		
Majority		180		
Labour hold		Swing		

=== Riverside ===
Riverside ward 1966
Party	Candidate	Votes	%	±%
Conservative	Sidney William Doxsey *	1,853		
Labour	Doris Elizabeth Cashman	1,114		
Majority		739		
Conservative hold		Swing		

=== Roath ===
Roath ward 1966
Party	Candidate	Votes	%	±%
Conservative	Norman Lloyd-Edwards *	3,339		
Labour	David Melville Porter	843		
Majority		2,496		
Conservative hold		Swing		

=== Rumney ===
Rumney ward 1966
Party	Candidate	Votes	%	±%
Labour	Lilian Clarice Scrivens *	2,463		
Conservative	Joan Taylor	1,802		
Majority		661		
Labour hold		Swing		

=== South ===
South ward 1966
Party	Candidate	Votes	%	±%
Labour	Philip Dunleavy	1,724		
Conservative	John Anthony Clarke	1,165		
Majority		559		
Labour hold		Swing		

=== Splott ===
Splott ward 1966
Party	Candidate	Votes	%	±%
Labour	David Myfyr Evans *	2,207		
Conservative	Brian Sandford Hill	1,471		
Plaid Cymru	Donald Arthur Nicholson	387		
Majority		736		
Labour hold		Swing		

* = 'retiring' ward councillor for re-election
