= 1966 South Vietnamese Constitutional Assembly election =

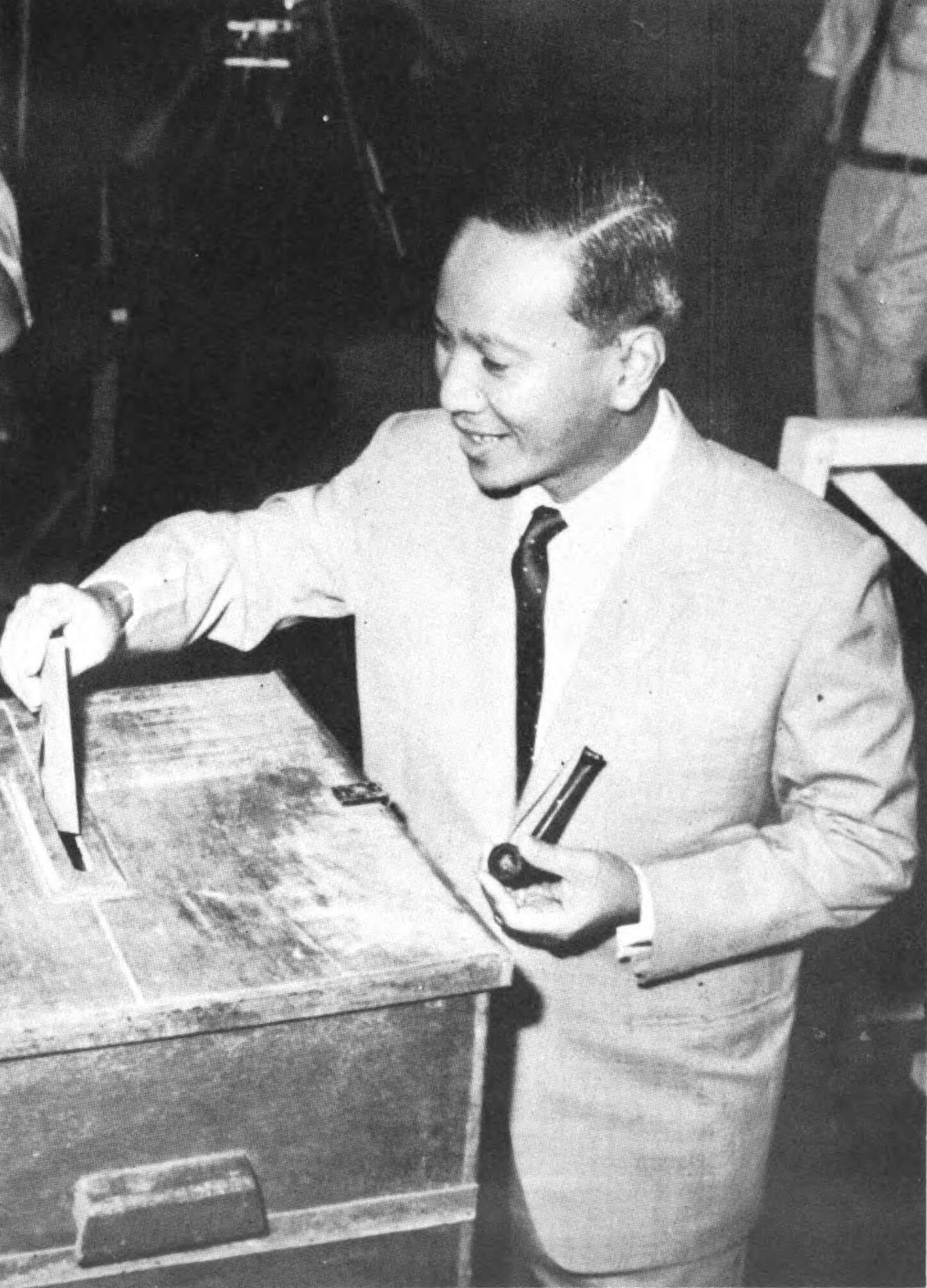
Major General Nguyễn Văn Thiệu casting his ballot

Constitutional Assembly elections were held in South Vietnam on 11 September 1966. A total of 532 candidates contested the 117 seats. The Assembly drafted and approved a new constitution, which was promulgated the following year.

== Electoral system ==
The electoral system used the 44 provinces of South Vietnam as districts. Each province was one district, except the city of Saigon, which was divided into three districts, and Gia Định, which was divided into two districts. Provinces that elected more than one member used proportional representation with seats allocated using the d'Hondt method, while provinces that only elected one member used the first-past-the-post system.

== Results ==
Party	Votes	%	Seats
Việt Nam Quốc Dân Đảng			12
Dai Viet Progressive Party			9
Independents			96
Total			117
Total votes	4,274,872	–	
Registered voters/turnout	5,288,572	80.83	
Source: Nohlen et al.
