= 1966 Swiss referendum =

Two referendums were held in Switzerland on 16 October 1966. Voters were asked whether they approved of an amendment to the constitution on Swiss citizens living abroad and a popular initiative "for the fight against alcoholism". The constitutional amendment was approved whilst the popular initiative was rejected.

== Results ==
=== Constitutional amendment ===
Choice	Popular vote		Cantons		
Choice	Votes	%	Full	Half	Total
For	491,220	68.1	19	6	22
Against	230,483	31.9	0	0	0
Blank votes	33,719	–	–	–	–
Invalid votes	1,163	–	–	–	–
Total	756,585	100	19	6	22
Registered voters/turnout	1,580,573	47.9	–	–	–
Source: Nohlen & Stöver

=== Popular initiative on alcoholism ===
Choice	Votes	%
For	174,242	23.4
Against	571,267	76.6
Blank votes	12,697	–
Invalid votes	1,164	–
Total	759,370	100
Registered voters/turnout	1,580,573	48.0
Source: Nohlen & Stöver
