= 1967 United Kingdom local elections =

Elections in the United Kingdom

The 1967 United Kingdom local elections took place in 1967.

== England ==
=== County councils ===
- Bedfordshire
- Berkshire
- Buckinghamshire
- Cambridgeshire and Isle of Ely
- Cheshire
- Cornwall
- Cumberland
- Derbyshire
- Devon
- Dorset
- Durham
- East Riding
- East Suffolk
- East Sussex
- Essex
- Gloucestershire
- Hampshire
- Herefordshire
- Hertfordshire
- Holland
- Huntingdon and Peterborough
- Isle of Wight
- Kent
- Kesteven
- Lancashire
- Leicestershire
- Lindsey
- Norfolk
- North Riding
- Northamptonshire
- Northumberland
- Nottinghamshire
- Oxfordshire
- Rutland
- Shropshire
- Somerset
- Staffordshire
- Surrey
- Warwickshire
- West Riding
- West Suffolk
- West Sussex
- Westmorland
- Wiltshire
- Worcestershire

=== Municipal councils ===
- Altrincham
- Greater London
- Hale
- Leeds
- Sale
- Stretford
- Liverpool
- Manchester
- Salford
- Sheffield

== Northern Ireland ==
- Belfast
- Londonderry

== Scotland ==
=== City corporations ===
- Aberdeen
- Dundee
- Edinburgh
- Glasgow

=== County councils ===
- Aberdeenshire
- Angus
- Argyllshire
- Ayrshire
- Banffshire
- Berwickshire
- Buteshire
- Caithness
- Clackmannanshire
- Dumfriesshire
- Dunbartonshire
- East Lothian
- Fife
- Inverness-shire
- Kincardineshire
- Kinross-shire
- Kirkcudbrightshire
- Lanarkshire
- Midlothian
- Moray
- Nairnshire
- Peeblesshire
- Perthshire
- Orkney
- Renfrewshire
- Ross and Cromarty
- Roxburghshire
- Selkirkshire
- Stirlingshire
- Sutherland
- West Lothian
- Wigtownshire
- Zetland

== Wales ==
- Anglesey
- Brecknockshire
- Carnarvonshire
- Cardiganshire
- Carmarthenshire
- Denbighshire
- Flintshire
- Glamorganshire
- Merionethshire
- Monmouthshire
- Montgomeryshire
- Pembrokeshire
- Radnorshire

=== County boroughs ===
- Cardiff
- Merthyr Tydfil
- Newport
- Swansea

=== Rural districts ===
- Neath

== See also ==
- 1967 in the United Kingdom
