= 1971 Edinburgh Corporation election =

Local election in Scotland

- 4 May 1971

23 of the 69 seats to the Edinburgh Corporation 35 seats needed for a majority
	First party	Second party	Third party
Leader	Jack Kane
Party	Labour	Progressives	Conservative
Last election	21	31	6
Seats before	21	32	7
Seats won	10	8	4
Seats after	28	27	9
Seat change	▲7	▼5	▲2
Popular vote	53,439	33,906	22,147
Percentage	42.7%	27.1%	17.7%
	Fourth party	Fifth party	Sixth party
Leader			Frederick Chalmers
Party	Liberal	Independent	SNP
Last election	2	2	7
Seats before	2	2	5
Seats won	1	0	0
Seats after	3	2	0
Seat change	▲1	Steady	▼5
Popular vote	9,409	N/A	5,481
Percentage	7.5%	N/A	4.4%
- Results by ward.
Council control before election
No overall control
Council control after election
No overall control

An election to Edinburgh Corporation was held on 4 May 1971, alongside municipal elections across Scotland. Of the council's 68 seats, 23 were up for election.

Following the election, Edinburgh Corporation was composed of 28 Labour councillors, 27 Progressives, 9 Conservatives, 3 Liberals, and 2 independents. The SNP was wiped off the council after it lost all five of the seats it was defending.

Following the election, the Progressives and Conservative coalition retained control of the council with a majority of three seats.

A total of 125,045 residents voted.

== Aggregate results ==
Edinburgh Corporation election, 1971
Party	Seats	Gains	Losses	Net gain/loss	Seats %	Votes %	Votes	+/−
Labour	10	7	0	▲7	43.5	42.7	53,439	
Progressives	8	0	5	▼5	34.8	27.1	33,906	
Conservative	4	2	0	▲2	17.4	17.7	22,147	
Liberal	1	1	0	▲1	4.3	7.5	9,409	
SNP	0	0	5	▼5	0.0	4.4	5,481	
Communist	0	0	0	Steady	0.0	0.2	273	
Protestant Action	0	0	0	Steady	0.0	0.2	217	
Local Community	0	0	0	Steady	0.0	0.1	173	

== Ward results ==
Location of Broughton ward

Broughton
Party	Candidate	Votes	%
Progressives	G. A. Theurer	2,407	
Labour	R. Cairns	1,784	
Majority			
Turnout			34.08%
Progressives hold			

Location of Calton ward

Calton
Party	Candidate	Votes	%
Labour	J. Anderson	1,874	
Conservative	Margaret E. S. Houston	1,774	
Majority			
Turnout			35.32%
Labour gain from SNP			

Location of Central Leith ward

Central Leith
Party	Candidate	Votes	%
Labour	R. Brown	2,210	
SNP	F. T. Chalmers	714	
Conservative	J. Whyte	677	
Communist	L. Farquhar	26	
Majority			
Turnout			32.81%
Labour gain from SNP			

Location of Colinton ward

Colinton
Party	Candidate	Votes	%
Conservative	J. D. MacLennan	3,568	
Labour	R. B. Graham	3,475	
Progressives	J. Dalgleish	2,221	
SNP	Joan B. Crawford	955	
Majority			
Turnout			41.86%
Conservative gain from Progressives			

Location of Corstorphine ward

Corstorphine
Party	Candidate	Votes	%
Progressives	F. Ford	2,508	
Conservative	T. W. Norrish	1,925	
Liberal	D. C. E. Gorrie	1,678	
Labour	P. R. Wallington	1,436	
Majority			
Turnout			42.32%
Progressives hold			

Location of Craigentinny ward

Craigentinny
Party	Candidate	Votes	%
Labour	G. Drummond	3,731	
Conservative	A. Hogg	2,204	
Communist	T. Burns	108	
Majority			
Turnout			40.06%
Labour hold			

Location of Craigmillar ward

Craigmillar
Party	Candidate	Votes	%
Labour	D. H. Brown	3,831	
SNP	J. Wallace	932	
Majority			
Turnout			30.51%
Labour hold			

Location of George Square ward

George Square
Party	Candidate	Votes	%
Conservative	D. F. Alves	1,529	
Labour	I. R. Hoy	1,141	
Majority			
Turnout			26.51%
Conservative gain from Progressives			

Location of Gorgie-Dalry ward

Gorgie-Dalry
Party	Candidate	Votes	%
Labour	Johan G. W. Buchanan	2,628	
Conservative	J. I. Chisholm	1,452	
SNP	E. J. Milne	756	
Majority			
Turnout			35.41%
Labour gain from SNP			

Location of Holyrood ward

Holyrood
Party	Candidate	Votes	%
Labour	R. F. Cook	1,599	
Conservative	D. Christison	489	
SNP	A. McCallum	235	
Communist	Angela Hopkinson	58	
Majority			
Turnout			34.89%
Labour gain from SNP			

Location of Liberton ward

Liberton
Party	Candidate	Votes	%
Labour	P. Wilson	6,923	
Conservative	D. J. May	3,558	
Majority			
Turnout			40.87%
Labour hold			

Location of Merchiston ward

Merchiston
Party	Candidate	Votes	%
Liberal	J. F. Lawrie	3,473	
Progressives	T. Morgan	2,461	
Majority			
Turnout			50.42%
Liberal gain from Progressives			

Location of Morningside ward

Morningside
Party	Candidate	Votes	%
Progressives	R. Lorimer	3,263	
Liberal	N. L. Gordon	2,057	
Majority			
Turnout			34.47%
Progressives hold			

Location of Murrayfield-Cramond ward

Murrayfield-Cramond
Party	Candidate	Votes	%
Progressives	H. Macpherson	4,975	
Labour	D. M. Henderson	2,475	
Majority			
Turnout			34.08%
Progressives hold			

Location of Newington ward

Newington
Party	Candidate	Votes	%
Progressives	E. M. Kean	3,463	
Labour	D. F. Renton	1,913	
Liberal	J. Grahamslaw	1,144	
SNP	Christina MacWhirter	518	
Majority			
Turnout			40.01%
Progressives hold			

Location of Pilton ward

Pilton
Party	Candidate	Votes	%
Labour	Catherine T. Nealon	4,609	
Conservative	R. Beattie	1,001	
Majority			
Turnout			28.17%
Labour hold			

Location of Portobello ward

Portobello
Party	Candidate	Votes	%
Progressives	G. Lerette	3,305	
Labour	Mary Hutchinson	1,985	
Majority			
Turnout			36.85%
Progressives hold			

Location of St Andrews ward

St. Andrews
Party	Candidate	Votes	%
Conservative	D. Drummond-Young	1,566	
Labour	R. A. Collett	915	
Majority			
Turnout			33.24%
Conservative hold			

Location of St Bernards ward

St. Bernard's
Party	Candidate	Votes	%
Progressives	Winifred E. Donaldson	3,326	
Labour	R. D. Anderson	2,029	
Liberal	C. S. Waterman	722	
Local Community	J. A. Stevenson	173	
Majority			
Turnout			34.47%
Progressives hold			

Location of St Giles ward

St. Giles
Party	Candidate	Votes	%
Labour	L. M. Christie	1,470	
Conservative	J. McConnell	388	
Progressives	J. McCann	365	
Majority			
Turnout			24.15%
Labour gain from SNP			

Location of Sighthill ward

Sighthill
Party	Candidate	Votes	%
Labour	J. T. Davies	4,444	
Conservative	W. R. Scott	840	
SNP	R. Mackenna	632	
Progressives	G. D. M. Galbraith	605	
Liberal	Pamela W. King	335	
Communist	W. M. Millar	81	
Majority			
Turnout			38.84%
Labour gain from Progressives			

Location of South Leith

South Leith
Party	Candidate	Votes	%
Labour	A. Ross	2,514	
Progressives	A. L. Mackintosh	1,943	
SNP	Mary G. Thompson	739	
Protestant Action	J. R. Maclean	217	
Majority			
Turnout			42.32%
Labour gain from Progressives			

Location of West Leith ward

West Leith
Party	Candidate	Votes	%
Progressives	A. D. Wilson	3,064	
Labour	R. Jeffreys-Jones	1,629	
Majority			
Turnout			41.94%
Progressives hold			
