= 1972 Edinburgh Corporation election =

Local election in Scotland

- 2 May 1972

23 of the 69 seats to the Edinburgh Corporation 35 seats needed for a majority
	First party	Second party	Third party
Leader	Jack Kane		Brian Meek
Party	Labour	Progressives	Conservative
Last election	28	27	9
Seats before	28	26	9
Seats won	10	7	3
Seats after	33	21	9
Seat change	▲5	▼5	Steady
Popular vote	59,456	31,479	25,808
Percentage	42.0%	22.2%	18.2%
	Fourth party	Fifth party
Leader	Robert Smith
Party	Liberal	Independent
Last election	3	2
Seats before	4	3
Seats won	2	1
Seats after	5	2
Seat change	▲1	▼1
Popular vote	14,554	4,286
Percentage	10.3%	3.0%
- Results by ward.
Council control before election
No overall control
Council control after election
No overall control

An Election to the Edinburgh Corporation was held on 2 May 1972, alongside municipal elections across Scotland. Of the councils 69 seats, 23 were up for election.

Following the election, with two by-elections pending, Edinburgh Corporation was composed of 33 Labour councillors, 21 Progressives, 9 Conservatives, and 5 Liberals. Labour did particularly well in the 1972 municipal elections across Scotland, and this was also the case in Edinburgh, where the party came close to gaining control of the council for the first time, controlling 33 of the councils 68 seats. The Liberals, with 5 seats, held the balance of power in the new council. Following the election Edinburgh corporation would elect its first Labour Lord Provost; Jack Kane.

The election also witnessed the continuation of the decline of the Progressives, who lost 5 seats.

Turnout was 42.1%.

== Aggregate results ==
Edinburgh Corporation election, 1972
Party	Seats	Gains	Losses	Net gain/loss	Seats %	Votes %	Votes	+/−
Labour	11	5	0	▲5	43.5	42.0	59,456	
Progressives	5	0	5	▼5	30.4	22.2	31,479	
Conservative	4	2	2	Steady	13.0	18.2	25,808	
Liberal	2	1	0	▲1	8.7	10.3	14,554	
Independent	1	0	1	▼1	4.3	3.0	4,286	
SNP	0	0	0	Steady	0.0	2.9	4,142	
Communist	0	0	0	Steady	0.0	1.0	1,382	

== Ward results ==
Location of Broughton ward

Broughton
Party	Candidate	Votes	%
Progressives	G. Fraser	2,446	
Labour	R. Cairns	1,784	
SNP	J. Maxwell	431	
Majority		662	
Turnout			38.62%
Progressives hold			

Location of Calton ward

Calton
Party	Candidate	Votes	%
Labour	M. Moules	2,087	
Progressives	Josephine Dickson	1,921	
Majority		166	
Turnout			40.00%
Labour gain from Progressives			

Location of Central Leith ward

Central Leith
Party	Candidate	Votes	%
Labour	J. Hastle	2,496	
Conservative	Margaret Houston	791	
SNP	J. Geddes	354	
Communist	L. Farquhar	33	
Majority		1705	
Turnout			34.04%
Labour hold			

Location of Colinton ward

Colinton
Party	Candidate	Votes	%
Conservative	A. Meek	5,286	
Labour	J. H. McKay	4,908	
Progressives	D. Mackenzie	1,162	
SNP	J. McKernan	752	
Majority		378	
Turnout			48.03%
Conservative hold			

Location of Corstorphine ward

Corstorphine
Party	Candidate	Votes	%
Liberal	Joyce Sheln	3,465	
Progressives	Mrs Robertson Murray	2,405	
Conservative	W. Percy	1,847	
Labour	B. R. MacKenzie	1,226	
SNP	A. S. Weir	246	
Majority		1,060	
Turnout			51.88%
Liberal gain from Progressives			

Location of Craigentinny ward

Craigentinny
Party	Candidate	Votes	%
Labour	W. S. Dalgleish	4,181	
Conservative	G. V. McAra	2,159	
Communist	T. Burns	111	
Majority		2,022	
Turnout			43.37%
Labour hold			

Location of Craigmillar ward

Craigmillar
Party	Candidate	Votes	%
Labour	R. Fox	4,393	
Conservative	Norma-Ann Clayton	622	
Communist	J. O'Donnell	140	
Majority		3731	
Turnout			33.01%
Labour hold			

Location of George Square ward

George Square
Party	Candidate	Votes	%
Progressives	C. Murphy	1,525	
Labour	J. F. Stephen	1,515	
Liberal	M. G. Falchikov	402	
Independent Nationalist	R. M. S. Tuck	150	
Majority		10	
Turnout			36.17%
Progressives hold			

Location of Gorgie-Dalry ward

Gorgie-Dalry
Party	Candidate	Votes	%
Labour	M. McGregor	2,785	
Conservative	J. McConnell	1,188	
SNP	E. Milne	651	
Majority		1597	
Turnout			34.55%
Labour gain from Conservative			

Location of Holyrood ward

Holyrood
Party	Candidate	Votes	%
Labour	O. Hand	1,546	
Conservative	P. Jones	688	
Majority			
Turnout			34.37%
Labour hold			

Location of Liberton ward

Liberton
Party	Candidate	Votes	%
Labour	J. C. Campbell	7,705	
Conservative	A. H. Lester	4,025	
Communist	W. Cowan	133	
Majority		3680	
Turnout			46.06%
Labour gain from Conservative			

Location of Merchiston ward

Merchiston
Party	Candidate	Votes	%
Liberal	J. G. Gray	3,444	
Progressives	J. Dalgleish	1,573	
Labour	R. N. F. Halliday	756	
Majority		1871	
Turnout			49.23%
Liberal hold			

Location of Morningside ward

Morningside
Party	Candidate	Votes	%
Progressives	J. Bateman	3,252	
Liberal	N. L. Gordon	2,718	
SNP	R. J. Shirley	427	
Majority		534	
Turnout			46.76%
Progressives hold			

Location of Murrayfield-Cramond ward

Murrayfield-Cramond
Party	Candidate	Votes	%
Conservative	G. G. Norval	5,648	
Labour	W. J. Taylor	3,247	
Liberal	E. Sutherland-Loveday	1,111	
Majority		2401	
Turnout			44.98%
Conservative gain from Progressives			

Location of Newington ward

Newington
Party	Candidate	Votes	%
Independent	J. D. Kidd	4,286	
Labour	B. Rutherford	1,798	
Liberal	J. Grahamslaw	1,298	
SNP	Christina MacWhirter	413	
Communist	Michele Gunn	78	
Majority		2488	
Turnout			46.39%
Independent hold			

Location of Pilton ward

Pilton
Party	Candidate	Votes	%
Labour	R. W. Irvine	5,244	
Conservative	Sarah Pringle	1,149	
Communist	C McManus	131	
Majority		4095	
Turnout			33.79%
Labour hold			

Location of Portobello ward

Portobello
Party	Candidate	Votes	%
Progressives	K. W. Borthwick	3,860	
Labour	Mary Hutchison	2,215	
Majority		1645	
Turnout			42.14%
Progressives hold			

Location of St Andrews ward

St. Andrews
Party	Candidate	Votes	%
Conservative	I. A. Cramond	1,496	
Labour	P. McGhee	855	
Liberal	C. S. Waterman	474	
Majority		6358	
Turnout			38.99%
Conservative hold			

Location of St Bernards ward

St. Bernard's
Party	Candidate	Votes	%
Conservative	J. Sanderson	4,000	
Labour	R. D. Anderson	2,581	
Liberal	R. H. Guild	1,227	
Majority		1419	
Turnout			43.87%
Conservative gain from Progressives			

Location of St Giles ward

St. Giles
Party	Candidate	Votes	%
Labour	J. McInally	1,542	
Conservative	D. J. Walker	525	
Majority		1017	
Turnout			24.13%
Labour hold			

Location of Sighthill ward

Sighthill
Party	Candidate	Votes	%
Labour	D. Renton	4,920	
Conservative	W. Scott	1,175	
Communist	W. Miller	889	
SNP	R. MacKenna	542	
Liberal	A. A. Mackay	415	
Majority		3745	
Turnout			43.90%
Labour gain from Independent			

Location of South Leith

South Leith
Party	Candidate	Votes	%
Labour	I. R. Hoy	2,614	
Progressives	C. Waugh	2,362	
SNP	J. Sinclair	326	
Protestant Action	J. Maclean	151	
Majority		252	
Turnout			46.16%
Labour gain from Progressives			

Location of West Leith ward

West Leith
Party	Candidate	Votes	%
Progressives	W. S. Lyle	3,397	
Labour	N. Lindsay	1,843	
Majority		1554	
Turnout			46.18%
Progressives hold			
