= 1969 Edinburgh Corporation election =

Local election in Scotland

- 6 May 1969

22 of the 69 seats to the Edinburgh Corporation 35 seats needed for a majority
	First party	Second party	Third party
Party	Progressives	Labour	SNP
Last election	34	21	8
Seats before	31	22	9
Seats won	10	6	1
Seats after	29	17	10
Seat change	▼2	▼5	▲1
Popular vote	29,625	22,548	31,967
Percentage	25.9%	19.7%	27.9%
	Fourth party	Fifth party	Sixth party
Party	Conservative	Liberal	Independent
Last election	3	1	1
Seats before	3	1	2
Seats won	1	1	1
Seats after	7	2	2
Seat change	▲4	▲1	Steady
Popular vote	17,086	9,418	3,124
Percentage	14.9%	8.2%	2.7%
- Results by ward.
Council control before election
No overall control
Council control after election
No overall control

An Election to the Edinburgh Corporation was held on 6 May 1969, alongside municipal elections across Scotland. Of the councils 69 seats, 23 were up for election.

Following the election, with two by-elections pending, Edinburgh Corporation was composed of 29 Progressives, 17 Labour councillors, 10 SNP councillors, 7 Conservatives, 2 Liberals, and 2 independents. The Conservatives in particular did well, gaining 4 councillors. Two of these gains were at the expense of Labour, in mainly working class wards. The SNP, in contrast, who had done so well at the previous election, only gained Sighthill.

Following the election, the Progressives and Conservative coalition retained control of the council with a majority of 2. There was some friction between the two sides however, with the Conservatives unseating Mr Robert McLaughlin, the former leader of the Progressive group and the deputy chairman of the council for 7 years, in the St. Andrews ward. The Conservatives also gained Colinton, the seat of the retiring Lord Provost Brechin. The seat was not contested by the Progressives. Most Progressive losses, with the exception of St. Andrews ward, were caused by incumbent Progressives stepping down and being replaced with new Conservative councillors. In Merchiston however the Conservative candidate was defeated, with the Liberals instead gaining the seat, meaning that the Liberals controlled 2 out of the 3 Merchiston ward seats.

Turnout was 114,582.

== Aggregate results ==
Edinburgh Corporation election, 1969
Party	Seats	Gains	Losses	Net gain/loss	Seats %	Votes %	Votes	+/−
Progressives	10	1	3	▼2	43.48	25.85	29,625	
Labour	6	0	5	▼5	26.09	19.68	22,548	
Conservative	4	4	0	▲4	17.39	14.91	17,086	
SNP	1	1	0	▲1	4.35	27.90	31,967	
Liberal	1	1	0	▲1	4.35	8.22	9,418	
Independent	1	0	0	Steady	4.35	2.73	3,124	
Communist	0	0	0	Steady	0.00	0.71	814	

== Ward results ==
Location of Broughton ward

Broughton
Party	Candidate	Votes	%
Progressives	H. G. P. Fraser	2,136	
SNP	J. C. MacDougall	1,427	
Liberal	J. J. Rickard	731	
Majority		709	
Turnout			36.06
Progressives hold			

Location of Calton ward

Calton
Party	Candidate	Votes	%
Progressives	Josephine Dickson	1,901	
Labour	J. S. Cook	970	
SNP	R. J. W. Swanson	666	
Majority		931	
Turnout			35.12
Progressives hold			

Location of Central Leith ward

Central Leith
Party	Candidate	Votes	%
Labour	A. Crichton	1,745	
SNP	A. Stoddart	938	
Conservative	M. Doyle	718	
Communist	T. C. Taylor	46	
Majority		807	
Turnout			31.77
Labour hold			

Location of Colinton ward

Colinton
Party	Candidate	Votes	%
Conservative	B. A. Meek	4,526	53.33
SNP	A. Westwood	1,938	22.83
Liberal	Geraldine R. Johnston	1,015	11.96
Labour	Mary Hutchison	1,008	11.88
Majority		2588	30.50
Turnout		8487	42.43
Conservative gain from Progressives			

Location of Corstorphine ward

Corstorphine
Party	Candidate	Votes	%
Progressives	Mary Robertson Murray	4,050	55.18
SNP	R. J. D. Scott	1,860	25.34
Liberal	Vera P. Heggie	1,430	19.48
Majority		2190	29.84
Turnout		7340	44.76
Progressives hold			

Location of Craigentinny ward

Craigintinny
Party	Candidate	Votes	%
Labour	W. S. Dalgleish	1,967	
Conservative	W. R. V. Percy	1,819	
SNP	J. Deans	1,328	
Majority		148	
Turnout			35.79
Labour hold			

Location of Craigmillar ward

Craigmillar
Party	Candidate	Votes	%
Labour	R. A. Fox	2,179	
SNP	T. Flemming	1,897	
Communist	M. D'Arcy	150	
Majority		282	
Turnout			28.98
Labour hold			

Location of George Square ward

George Square
Party	Candidate	Votes	%
Progressives	C. F. Murray	1,545	53.55
SNP	T. C. Bogle	934	32.37
Liberal	Joan M. Gallacher	406	14.07
Majority		611	21.18
Turnout		2885	30.09
Progressives hold			

Location of Gorgie-Dalry ward

Gorgie-Dalry
Party	Candidate	Votes	%
Conservative	M. Pirie	1,769	
Labour	T. McGregor	1,401	
SNP	A. B. Moore	1,096	
Majority		368	
Turnout			31.97
Conservative gain from Labour			

Location of Holyrood ward

Holyrood
Party	Candidate	Votes	%
Labour	O. Hand	960	
SNP	J. G. B. Henderson	818	
Communist	C. B. Swan	173	
Majority		142	
Turnout			27.08
Labour hold			

Location of Liberton ward

Liberton
Party	Candidate	Votes	%
Conservative	A. H. Lester	3,218	
Labour	F. M. Lawson	3,025	
SNP	A. G. Symington	2,295	
Majority		193	
Turnout			37.50
Conservative gain from Labour			

Location of Merchiston ward

Merchiston
Party	Candidate	Votes	%
Liberal	J. G. Gray	2,613	
Conservative	C. H. Richards	1,855	
SNP	N. B. Harris	644	
Majority		758	
Turnout			45.77
Liberal gain from Progressives			

Location of Morningside ward

Morningside
Party	Candidate	Votes	%
Progressives	J. Bateman	3,316	
Liberal	G. Duke	1,192	
SNP	Bethia L. Howden	896	
Majority		2124	
Turnout			41.99
Progressives hold			

Location of Murrayfield-Cramond ward

Murrayfield-Cramond
Party	Candidate	Votes	%
Progressives	H. Macpherson	5,078	
SNP	W. R. Platt	2,000	
Labour	I. M. Christie	914	
Majority		3078	
Turnout			40.14
Progressives hold			

Location of Newington ward

Newington
Party	Candidate	Votes	%
Independent	J. D. Kidd	3,124	
SNP	G. Telford	1,819	
Liberal	W. McLeod	1,088	
Labour	G. C. Campbell	778	
Majority		1305	
Turnout			44.17
Independent hold			

Location of Pilton ward

Pilton
Party	Candidate	Votes	%
Labour	R. W. Irvine	1,639	
SNP	W. Thomson	1,542	
Conservative	R. Beattie	1,012	
Communist	C. McManus	163	
Majority		97	
Turnout			22.58
Labour hold			

Location of Portobello ward

Portobello
Party	Candidate	Votes	%
Progressives	K. W. Borthwick	3,143	
SNP	R. G. Kelly	2,044	
Labour	J. E. Boyack	792	
Majority		1099	
Turnout			43.83
Progressives hold			

Location of Sighthill ward

Sighthill
Party	Candidate	Votes	%
SNP	K. D. A. Johnston	2,481	52.17
Labour	G. Foulkes	1,993	41.90
Communist	W. Millar	282	5.93
Majority		488	10.27
Turnout		4756	30.05
SNP gain from Labour			

Location of South Leith

South Leith
Party	Candidate	Votes	%
Progressives	C. Waugh	1,798	
SNP	J. S. Marshall	1,681	
Labour	Sheila King Murray	1,557	
Majority		117	
Turnout			39.79
Progressives gain from Labour			

Location of St Andrews ward

St. Andrews
Party	Candidate	Votes	%
Conservative	I. A. Crammond	1,467	57.78
SNP	D. M. Miller	625	24.62
Progressives	R. McLaughlin	447	17.61
Majority		842	33.16
Turnout		2539	33.5
Conservative gain from Progressives			

Location of St Bernards ward

St. Bernard's
Party	Candidate	Votes	%
Progressives	D. A. Adamson	3,037	
SNP	W. K. Archibald	968	
Liberal	W. Murray	943	
Labour	T. H. Greig	584	
Majority		2069	
Turnout			32.85
Progressives hold			

Location of St Giles ward

St. Giles
Party	Candidate	Votes	%
Labour	J. McInally	1,036	
SNP	A. A. Edmonds	842	
Conservative	A. J. A. Bell	702	
Majority		194	
Turnout			27.67
Labour hold			

Location of West Leith ward

West Leith
Party	Candidate	Votes	%
Progressives	B. W. Lyle	3,174	72.10
SNP	T. J. D. MacDonald	1,228	27.90
Majority		1946	44.20
Turnout		4402	40.15
Progressives hold			
