= 1955 Aberdeen Corporation election =

Election

← 1954	May 3, 1955	1956 →

12 out of 37 seats of City of Aberdeen Council 19 seats needed for a majority
- Turnout: 25.42% ▼
	First party	Second party	Third party
Party	Labour	Progressives	Independent
Seats won	7	5	0
Seats after	20	16	1
Seat change	0	0	0
Popular vote	10,616	7,561	0
Percentage	50.78%	36.17%	0%
	Fourth party	Fifth party	Sixth party
Party	Scottish Self-Government	Aberdeen Municipal Unionist Party	Communist
Seats won	0	0	0
Seats after	0	0	0
Seat change	0	0	0
Popular vote	1,693	606	428
Percentage	8.10%	2.90%	2.05%
- Composition of Corporation after the election

An election to the Aberdeen Corporation was held on 3 May 1955, alongside municipal elections across Scotland. 12 of the corporation's 37 seats were up for election, although only 8 were contested.

This election maintained the status quo of the last few years, with no seats changing hands and a further decrease in turnout resulting in another record low. The day before the election, David Sinclair Hay, councilor for Torry, resigned from the Labour Party and declared he would be sitting the rest of his term as an Independent.

== Ward results ==
Cairncry
Party	Candidate	Votes	%
Labour	R. S. Lennox (incumbent)	Unopposed	
Labour hold			

Ferryhill
Party	Candidate	Votes	%
Progressives	J. T. L. Parkinson (incumbent)	2,268	59.22
Labour	Ellen M. Williamson	1,562	40.78
Majority		706	
Turnout		3,830	36.95
Progressives hold			

Holburn
Party	Candidate	Votes	%
Progressives	Arnold M. Burns	1,890	70.18
Labour	Christopher L. Kinnaird	803	29.82
Majority		1,087	
Turnout		2,693	26.95
Progressives hold			

Rosemount
Party	Candidate	Votes	%
Progressives	Pat Mitchell (incumbent)	1,891	67.03
Aberdeen Municipal Unionist Party	R. M. Eyres	606	21.48
Scottish Self-Government	June Murray	324	11.49
Majority		1,224	
Turnout		2,821	31.33
Progressives hold			

Rubislaw
Party	Candidate	Votes	%
Progressives	J. A. Mackie (incumbent)	Unopposed	
Progressives hold			

Ruthrieston
Party	Candidate	Votes	%
Progressives	F. Magee (incumbent)	Unopposed	
Progressives hold			

St. Andrews
Party	Candidate	Votes	%
Labour	Colin MacIver (incumbent)	1,646	91.04
Communist	Andrew Smith	162	8.96
Majority		1,484	
Turnout		1,808	18.34
Labour hold			

St. Clements
Party	Candidate	Votes	%
Labour	John A. Grieg	1,861	80.35
Communist	James M. Aberdein	266	11.49
Scottish Self-Government	G. F. Watt	189	8.16
Majority		1,595	
Turnout		2,316	23.27
Labour hold			

St. Machar
Party	Candidate	Votes	%
Labour	J. M. Graham (incumbent)	Unopposed	
Labour hold			

St. Nicholas
Party	Candidate	Votes	%
Labour	G.R. M'Intosh (incumbent)	1,492	72.32
Scottish Self-Government	F. Conn	571	27.68
Majority		921	
Turnout		2,063	17.79
Labour hold			

Torry
Party	Candidate	Votes	%
Labour	Norman Hogg (incumbent)	1,578	82.19
Scottish Self-Government	T. W. Crockett	342	17.81
Majority		1,236	
Turnout		1,920	18.43
Labour hold			

Woodside
Party	Candidate	Votes	%
Labour	Rev. J. P. Crosgrove (incumbent)	1,674	48.48
Progressives	T. Murdoch	1,512	43.79
Scottish Self-Government	W. C. Inglis	267	7.73
Majority		162	
Turnout		3,453	31.41
Labour hold			
