= 1970 Edinburgh Corporation election =

Local election in Scotland

- 5 May 1970

23 of the 69 seats in Edinburgh Corporation 35 seats needed for a majority
	First party	Second party	Third party
Leader	James Slack	John Kane	George Galbraith
Party	Progressives	Labour	SNP
Last election	29	17	10
Seats before	29	19	8
Seats won	10	11	0
Seats after	31	21	7
Seat change	▲2	▲2	▼1
Popular vote	40,969	47,147	19,447
Percentage	30.3%	34.9%	14.4%
	Fourth party	Fifth party	Sixth party
Leader	Ronald Duff
Party	Conservative	Liberal	Independent
Last election	7	2	2
Seats before	7	2	4
Seats won	0	1	0
Seats after	6	2	2
Seat change	▼1	Steady	▼2
Popular vote	13,822	12,837	46
Percentage	10.2%	9.5%	0.03%
- Results by ward.
Council control before election
No overall control
Council control after election
No overall control

An Election to Edinburgh Corporation was held on the 5 May 1970. 23 seats were up for election.

Following the election, Edinburgh Corporation was composed of 31 Progressives, 21 Labour councillors, 7 SNP councillors, 6 Conservatives, 2 Liberals, and 2 independents. The SNP saw its vote collapse, failing to win a single ward and losing the only ward it was defending.

Following the election, the Progressives and Conservative coalition retained control of the council with a majority of five seats.

A total of 135,188 residents voted.

== Aggregate results ==
Edinburgh Corporation election, 1970
Party	Seats	Gains	Losses	Net gain/loss	Seats %	Votes %	Votes	+/−
Labour	11	2	0	▲2	47.8	34.9	47,147	
Progressives	10	3	1	▲2	43.5	30.3	40,969	
Conservative	1	0	1	▼1	4.3	10.2	13,822	
Liberal	1	0	0	Steady	4.3	9.5	12,837	
SNP	0	0	1	▼1	0.0	14.4	19,447	
Communist	0	0	0	Steady	0.0	0.5	662	
Special Branch for Special Action	0	0	0	Steady	0.0	0.2	258	
Independent	0	0	2	▼2	0.0	0.0	46	

== Ward results ==
Location of Broughton ward

Broughton
Party	Candidate	Votes	%
Progressives	A. Bailey	3,199	
Labour	R. Cairns	1,302	
SNP	G. C. MacDougall	703	
Liberal	R. J. Rickard	691	
Majority		1,897	
Turnout			47.71%
Progressives hold			

Location of Calton ward

Calton
Party	Candidate	Votes	%
Labour	J. Cook	2,119	
Progressives	W. S. Stone	1,833	
Majority		286	
Turnout			38.31%
Labour hold			

Location of Central Leith ward

Central Leith
Party	Candidate	Votes	%
Labour	T. McGregor	2,232	
SNP	J. L. Geddes	1,000	
Communist	A. M. K. McLaren	110	
Majority		1,232	
Turnout			29.77%
Labour hold			

Location of Colinton ward

Colinton
Party	Candidate	Votes	%
Progressives	Catherine Filsell	4,630	
Labour	T.J. Davies	2,593	
SNP	Joan Crawford	1,247	
Liberal	Joan Gallacher	1,145	
Majority		2,037	
Turnout			43.03%
Progressives hold			

Location of Corstorphine ward

Corstorphine
Party	Candidate	Votes	%
Progressives	Ronnie Simpson	4,264	
Liberal	Vera Heggie	1,967	
Labour	D. M. Henderson	1,352	
SNP	G. W. Telford	872	
Majority		2,297	
Turnout			48.94%
Progressives gain from Independent			

Location of Craigentinny ward

Craigentinny
Party	Candidate	Votes	%
Labour	Phyllis Herriot	3,389	
Conservative	W. R. V. Percy	2,091	
SNP	Jean Cameron	885	
Communist	T. Burns	71	
Majority		1,298	
Turnout			42.81%
Labour hold			

Location of Craigmillar ward

Craigmillar
Party	Candidate	Votes	%
Labour	J. Kane	3,314	
SNP	C. T. Cadden	1,169	
Communist	M. D'Arcy	109	
Majority		2,145	
Turnout			29.53%
Labour hold			

Location of George Square ward

George Square
Party	Candidate	Votes	%
Progressives	J. Slack	1,469	
Labour	Mary Hutchison	828	
SNP	W. K. Archibald	719	
Special Branch for Special Action	R. Tait	258	
Majority		641	
Turnout			32.02%
Progressives hold			

Location of Gorgie-Dalry ward

Gorgie-Dalry
Party	Candidate	Votes	%
Labour	M. Swanson	2,558	
Conservative	J. L. Chisholm	1,818	
SNP	A. Symington	839	
Majority		740	
Turnout			37.69%
Labour hold			

Location of Holyrood ward

Holyrood
Party	Candidate	Votes	%
Labour	P. Rogan	1,359	
SNP	N. W. Laurie	550	
Conservative	D. Christieson	497	
Communist	Angela Hopkinson	48	
Independent	J. Sheppard	46	
Majority		809	
Turnout			35.24%
Labour hold			

Location of Liberton ward

Liberton
Party	Candidate	Votes	%
Labour	J. D. McWilliam	5,583	
Conservative	Irene Hurst	4,132	
SNP	A. Stoddart	1,078	
Majority		1,451	
Turnout			42.23%
Labour gain from Conservative			

Location of Merchiston ward

Merchiston
Party	Candidate	Votes	%
Liberal	L. Smith	3,393	
Conservative	G. G. Norval	1,636	
Labour	G. J. Will	752	
SNP	H. J. Morris	324	
Majority		1,757	
Turnout			51.89%
Liberal hold			

Location of Morningside ward

Morningside
Party	Candidate	Votes	%
Progressives	Nansi Mansbridge	3,519	
Liberal	G. Duke	1,575	
SNP	D. Kelbie	612	
Majority		1,944	
Turnout			42.26%
Progressives hold			

Location of Murrayfield-Cramond ward

Murrayfield-Cramond
Party	Candidate	Votes	%
Progressives	R. M. Knox	5,158	
Labour	L. M. Christie	2,067	
Liberal	C. Dow	989	
SNP	D. Purves	958	
Majority		3,091	
Turnout			42.33%
Progressives hold			

Location of Newington ward

Newington
Party	Candidate	Votes	%
Progressives	G. Hedderwick	3,715	
Labour	J. C. Campbell	1,652	
Liberal	W. McLeod	1,265	
SNP	R. J. D. Scott	819	
Majority		2,063	
Turnout			45.13%
Progressives gain from Independent			

Location of Pilton ward

Pilton
Party	Candidate	Votes	%
Labour	M. Williamson	3,652	
Conservative	R. Beattie	1,066	
SNP	W. R. Platt	994	
Communist	C. Manus	148	
Majority		2,586	
Turnout			29.07%
Labour hold			

Location of Portobello ward

Portobello
Party	Candidate	Votes	%
Progressives	S. Cavaye	3,393	
SNP	W. T. Telford	1,769	
Labour	J. Anderson	1,310	
Communist	D. Cameron	78	
Majority		1,624	
Turnout			45.22%
Progressives gain from SNP			

Location of St Andrews ward

St. Andrews
Party	Candidate	Votes	%
Conservative	R. Duff	1,841	
Labour	T. H. Greig	712	
Majority		1,129	
Turnout			32.73%
Conservative hold			

Location of St Bernards ward

St. Bernard's
Party	Candidate	Votes	%
Progressives	J. Millar	3,289	
Labour	Johan Buchanan	1,689	
Liberal	C. S. Waterman	1,165	
SNP	G. M. Macintyre	624	
Majority		1,600	
Turnout			37.44%
Progressives hold			

Location of St Giles ward

St. Giles
Party	Candidate	Votes	%
Labour	C. Stuart	1,384	
SNP	B. C. Rutherford	790	
Conservative	D. H. Brydon	668	
Majority		594	
Turnout			30.30%
Labour hold			

Location of Sighthill ward

Sighthill
Party	Candidate	Votes	%
Labour	G. Foulkes	3,806	
SNP	R. McKenna	1,478	
Conservative	B. Shiels	1,139	
Liberal	Pamela King	647	
Communist	W. Millar	98	
Majority		2,328	
Turnout			39.63%
Labour hold			

Location of South Leith

South Leith
Party	Candidate	Votes	%
Labour	J. E. Boyack	2,336	
Progressives	T. S. Ramage	2,077	
SNP	J. S. Marshall	1,255	
Majority		259	
Turnout			43.40%
Labour gain from Progressives			

Location of West Leith ward

West Leith
Party	Candidate	Votes	%
Progressives	Margaret Ross	3,357	
Labour	Sonja Godfrey	1,158	
SNP	G. Osborne	762	
Majority		2,199	
Turnout		5,277	46.72%
Progressives hold			
