= 1969 Glasgow Corporation election =

Scottish municipal election

An Election to Glasgow City Council was held on 6 May 1969, alongside municipal elections across Scotland. Of the councils 111 seats, 37 were up for election. The election saw Labour losing its majority, with the council being gained by a Progressive-Conservative alliance, who emerged from the election with a total of 57 of the council's 111 seats.

Following the election, Glasgow Corporation was composed of 37 Labour councillors, 12 Conservatives, 45 Progressives, 15 SNP, and 2 vacant ex officio members.

Turnout was 215,452, out of a total electorate of 609,753 (39.33% turnout).

== Aggregate results ==
Glasgow Corporation election, 1969
Party	Seats	Gains	Losses	Net gain/loss	Seats %	Votes %	Votes	+/−
Progressives	15					20.97	45,180	
Labour	14					29.06	62,621	
Conservative	7					19.95	42,984	
SNP	1					26.23	56,507	
Other parties	0					3.79	8,160	
