= 1951 Aberdeen Corporation election =

Election

← 1950	May 1, 1951	1952 →

14 out of 37 seats of City of Aberdeen Council 19 seats needed for a majority
	First party	Second party	Third party
Party	Progressives	Labour	SNP
Seats won	1	0	0
Seats after	20	17	0
Seat change	1 ▲	1 ▼	0
Popular vote	17,553	15,905	988
Percentage	50.3%	45.5%	2.8%
	Fourth party
Party	Communist
Seats won	0
Seats after	0
Seat change	0
Popular vote	478
Percentage	1.4%
- Composition of Corporation after the election

An election to the Aberdeen Corporation was held on 1 May 1951, alongside municipal elections across Scotland. 14 of the corporation's 37 seats were up for election.

The election saw the Progressives make a one-seat gain on Labour, increasing their majority to 3. This election was the first that the Scottish National Party ran a candidate in Aberdeen local elections, doing so in the Woodside ward where the candidate placed last.

== Ward results ==
Ferryhill
Party	Candidate	Votes	%
Progressives	D. J. R. Macpherson	2,563	71.4
Labour	Mrs. Margaret Rose	1,026	28.6
Majority		1,537	
Turnout			37.8
Progressives hold			

Gilcomston
Party	Candidate	Votes	%
Progressives	David Henderson (incumbent)	1,925	53.4
Labour	R. B. Ferguson	1,680	46.6
Majority		245	
Turnout			50.9
Progressives hold			

Greyfriars 2 Seats
Party	Candidate	Votes	%
Labour	G. Stephen (incumbent)	Unopposed	
Labour	R. Bruce	Unopposed	
Majority			
Turnout			
Labour hold			
Labour hold			

Holburn
Party	Candidate	Votes	%
Progressives	G. Roberts (incumbent)	Unopposed	
Majority			
Turnout			
Progressives hold			

Rosemount
Party	Candidate	Votes	%
Progressives	Lt. Col. J. Patrick Jeffrey	3,218	74.5
Labour	William Craig	1,102	25.5
Majority		2,116	49.0
Turnout		4,320	37.8
Progressives hold			

Rubislaw
Party	Candidate	Votes	%
Progressives	A. T. Morrison (incumbent)	Unopposed	
Majority			
Turnout			
Progressives hold			

Ruthrieston
Party	Candidate	Votes	%
Progressives	F. Magee (incumbent)	Unopposed	
Majority			
Turnout			
Progressives hold			

St. Clements
Party	Candidate	Votes	%
Labour	Alexander Collie (incumbent)	1,606	87.2
Communist	Robert Cooney	236	12.8
Majority		1,370	
Turnout			26.2
Labour hold			

St. Machar
Party	Candidate	Votes	%
Labour	Robert A. Rafan	2,679	51.1
Progressives	Joseph Kelly	2,319	44.3
Communist	Stanley Simpson	242	4.6
Majority		360	
Turnout			32.5
Labour hold			

St. Nicholas
Party	Candidate	Votes	%
Labour	G. R. M'Intosh (incumbent)	1,083	55.5
Progressives	Forbes M. M. Donald	867	44.5
Majority		216	
Turnout			35.6
Labour hold			

Torry
Party	Candidate	Votes	%
Labour	G. Fraser (incumbent)	Unopposed	
Majority			
Turnout			
Labour hold			

Woodside 2 Seats
Party	Candidate	Votes	%
Labour	R. S. Lennox (incumbent)	3,660	
Progressives	L. T. Mutch	3,363	
Progressives	R. M. Eyres	3,298	
Labour	John Watt	3,069	
SNP	H. Wilson	988	
Majority		65	
Turnout			36.4
Labour hold			
Progressives hold			
