= 1967 Scottish local elections =

Scottish local elections were held in 1967 to elect members to the various Corporations, Burghs, and County Boards of Scotland.

== SNP Gains ==
The election was contested by a large number of SNP candidates, following on from their good showing in the 1967 Glasgow Pollok by-election. The SNP ultimately won 16% of the vote in the municipal elections, and won 23 seats. The election also saw the SNP gain their first Councillor on Clydebank Burgh Council.

== Conservative entry into Local Government ==
The elections also saw the first time that Conservatives contested local elections on a Conservative ticket. Previously the Conservative party had not contested local elections, with their place being instead fulfilled by local anti-socialist groups known as the Progressives. Despite these organisational differences however, the Progressives were seen by the electorate as Tories, and the two shared the same ideology.

The Conservative party's decision to partake in local elections was largely driven out of a desire to increase party efficiency. In contrast to the Conservatives, Labour had been competing in Scottish local elections for many years. This was seen as providing Labour party activists a great deal of valuable campaigning experience, whilst the Conservative party electoral machine had only been deployed in the intermittent general elections and by-elections. The lack of involvement in local elections also meant that the Conservatives were unable to assess party support as well as Labour. Even in 1974, when the Conservatives had been fighting local elections for several years, the party was still taken by surprise with the surge in SNP support in what were seen as traditional Scottish Tory heartlands.

== Results ==
=== Municipal Results ===
==== Municipal Aggregate ====
Scottish Municipal Elections, 1967
Party	Seats	Gains	Losses	Net gain/loss	Seats %	Votes %	Votes	+/−
Labour		3	42					
Progressives		10	0					
SNP		14	0				~200,000	
Conservative		8	0					
Moderates		3	1					
Liberal		4	1					
Communist		1	0					
Other parties		14	9					

==== Municipal Breakdown ====
Council	Labour	Progressives	Conservative	SNP	Liberal	Independent	Other	Turnout	Total Seats Contested	Control	Details
Aberdeen	6	6 (▲2)							12	Labour	Details
Dundee	6 (▼1)	6 (▲1)	0	0	0	0	0		12	No overall control	Details
Edinburgh	9 (▼3)	14 (▲1)	2 (▲2)	0	0	0	0		25	Progressives	Details
Glasgow	20 (▼3)	17 (▲2)	1 (▲1)						38	Labour	Details

Council	Labour	Progressives	Conservative	SNP	Liberal	Independent	Other	Turnout	Total Seats Contested	Control	Details
Burntisland	1 (▼3)	3 (▲3)							4	Progressives	Details
Dumbarton	2 (▼1)	3 (▲1) (Mods)							5	Moderates	Details
Hamilton	3 (▼1)	3 (▲1) (Unionists)							6	Labour	Details
Paisley	5 (▼2)					4 (▲2)	1	40.4 (▲4.2)	10	Labour	Details
Penicuik	0 (▼2)					3 (▲2)			3	Independent	Details

=== County Results ===
==== County Breakdown ====
Council	Labour	Progressives	Conservative	SNP	Liberal	Independent	Other	Turnout	Total Seats Contested	Control	Details
Aberdeenshire										Independent	Details
Angus										Independent	Details
Ayrshire											Details
Banffshire										Independent	Details
Berwickshire										Independent	Details
Bute										Independent	Details
Caithness										Independent	Details
Dumfriesshire										Independent	Details
Fife											Details
Lanarkshire										Labour	Details
Midlothian											Details
Renfrewshire										Independent	Details
Roxburghshire										Independent	Details
Selkirkshire										Independent	Details
Stirlingshire										No overall control	Details
Total											
