= 1963 United Kingdom local elections =

The 1963 United Kingdom local elections took place in 1963.

== List ==
- Edinburgh
- Finchley
- Leeds
- Liverpool
- Sheffield
