= 1953 Aberdeen Corporation election =

Election

← 1952	May 5, 1953	1954 →

12 out of 37 seats of City of Aberdeen Council 19 seats needed for a majority
- Turnout: 35.8% ▼
	First party	Second party	Third party
Party	Labour	Progressives	Scottish Self-Government
Seats won	7	5	0
Seats after	21	16	0
Seat change	0	0	0
Popular vote	15,121	15,651	1,708
Percentage	45.8%	47.4%	5.2%
	Fourth party
Party	Communist
Seats won	0
Seats after	0
Seat change	0
Popular vote	506
Percentage	1.5%
- Composition of Corporation after the election

An election to the Aberdeen Corporation was held on 5 May 1953, alongside municipal elections across Scotland. 12 of the corporation's 37 seats were up for election, although only 9 were contested.

Only minor changes occurred compared to the previous year, with the overall composition of the council staying the same. The Scottish Self-Government Party contested four seats this election, and the Communist Party contested one. The Dean of Guild continued to affiliate with the Progressives.

== Ward results ==
Cairncry
Party	Candidate	Votes	%
Labour	J. M'M. Watt (incumbent)	Unopposed	
Labour hold			

Ferryhill
Party	Candidate	Votes	%
Progressives	Andrew M'Robb (incumbent)	2,611	60.09
Labour	James M. Aberdein	1,734	39.91
Majority		877	
Turnout		4,345	
Progressives hold			

Holburn
Party	Candidate	Votes	%
Progressives	W. D. Reid (incumbent)	Unopposed	
Progressives hold			

Rosemount
Party	Candidate	Votes	%
Progressives	Patrick Mitchell	2,487	79.92
Scottish Self-Government	June A. L. Murray	625	20.08
Majority		1,862	
Turnout		3,112	
Progressives hold			

Rubislaw
Party	Candidate	Votes	%
Progressives	Harry J. Rae (incumbent)	3,470	79.28
Labour	Isabel M. Sellar	907	20.72
Majority		2,563	
Turnout		4,377	
Progressives hold			

Ruthrieston
Party	Candidate	Votes	%
Progressives	T. Scott Sutherland (incumbent)	2,794	63.51
Labour	Clifford K. Milton	1,605	36.49
Majority		1,189	
Turnout		4,399	
Progressives hold			

St. Andrews
Party	Candidate	Votes	%
Labour	R. M'G. Bruce (incumbent)	Unopposed	
Labour hold			

St. Clements
Party	Candidate	Votes	%
Labour	William K. Park (incumbent)	2,271	74.75
Communist	James M. Aberdein	506	16.66
Scottish Self-Government	William Sinclair	261	8.59
Majority		1,765	
Turnout		3,038	
Labour hold			

St. Machar
Party	Candidate	Votes	%
Labour	John D. Burgoyne (incumbent)	2,158	64.82
Progressives	John T. L. Parkinson	1,171	35.18
Majority		987	
Turnout		3,329	
Labour hold			

St. Nicholas
Party	Candidate	Votes	%
Labour	Robert A. M'Intyre (incumbent)	2,335	62.52
Progressives	Belle E. Jeffrey	1,400	37.48
Majority		935	
Turnout		3,735	
Labour hold			

Torry
Party	Candidate	Votes	%
Labour	David Sinclair Hay	1,886	81.93
Scottish Self-Government	George F. Watt	416	18.07
Majority		1,470	
Turnout		2,302	
Labour hold			

Woodside
Party	Candidate	Votes	%
Labour	Alan M'I Morrice (Incumbent)	2,225	51.16
Progressives	Leonard T. Mutch	1,718	39.50
Scottish Self-Government	William C. Inglis	406	9.34
Majority		507	
Turnout		4,349	
Labour hold			
