= 1972 Aberdeen Corporation election =

Local election in Scotland

- May 2, 1972

12 out of 36 seats of City of Aberdeen Council 19 seats needed for a majority
	First party	Second party	Third party
Party	Labour	Conservative	Independent
Seats won	8	4	0
Seats after	24	11	1
Seat change	0	0	0
Popular vote	26,864	17,603	0
Percentage	56.7%	37.2%	0%
	Fourth party	Fifth party	Sixth party
Party	Liberal	Communist	SNP
Seats won	0	0	0
Seats after	0	0	0
Seat change	0	0	0
Popular vote	1,912	501	477
Percentage	4%	1.1%	1%

An election to the Aberdeen Corporation was held on 2 May 1972, alongside municipal elections across Scotland. 12 of the corporation's 36 seats were up for election.

The election saw no change in the seat composition of the corporation, with all incumbents winning reelection, and Labour candidate George Whyte replacing Dr. Norman Hogg as a councilor from Torry.

== Ward results ==
Ferryhill
Party	Candidate	Votes	%
Labour	R. Pirie	3,511	60.5
Conservative	J. P. Kelman	1,970	33.9
SNP	Mrs Irene Bryce	327	5.6
Majority		1,544	
Turnout			40.4
Labour hold			

Holburn
Party	Candidate	Votes	%
Conservative	A. M. Burns	1,723	51.6
Labour	A. F. MacDonald	1,212	36.3
Liberal	Miss Margaret K. Moore	404	12.1
Majority		511	
Turnout			38
Conservative hold			

Mastrick
Party	Candidate	Votes	%
Labour	E. Hendrie	4,073	84.6
Conservative	H. S. Birse	610	12.7
Communist	W. R. Henderson	130	2.7
Majority		3,463	
Turnout			31.6
Labour hold			

Northfield
Party	Candidate	Votes	%
Labour	E. S. McPhea	2,388	87.4
Conservative	J. C. Anderson	239	8.8
Communist	A. Smith	104	3.8
Majority		2,149	
Turnout			23.4
Labour hold			

Rosemount
Party	Candidate	Votes	%
Conservative	H. W. Hatch	2,477	58.7
Labour	Mrs. Christina Wood	1,746	41.3
Majority		731	
Turnout			37.4
Conservative hold			

Rubislaw
Party	Candidate	Votes	%
Conservative	I. J. H. MacKay	3,123	68.5
Labour	W. Parquhar	759	16.6
Liberal	Mrs. Patricia G. Robbie	530	11.6
SNP	F. J. H. Clark	150	3.3
Majority		2,364	
Turnout			40.4
Conservative hold			

Ruthrieston
Party	Candidate	Votes	%
Conservative	F. Magee	3,258	64.7
Labour	A. Booth	1,776	35.3
Majority		1482	
Turnout			40.8
Conservative hold			

St. Clements
Party	Candidate	Votes	%
Labour	R. A. Robertson	1,800	80.6
Conservative	M. C. Hastie	346	15.5
Communist	G. Thomson	88	3.9
Majority		1,454	
Turnout			29.7
Labour hold			

St. Machar
Party	Candidate	Votes	%
Labour	H. Urquhart	2,822	63.4
Liberal	N. B. Lindsay	978	22.0
Conservative	R. Murchie	567	12.7
Communist	N. Williamson	86	2.9
Majority		1,844	
Turnout			32.0
Labour hold			

St. Nicholas
Party	Candidate	Votes	%
Labour	C. Devine	1,600	54.8
Conservative	N. G. M. Dunnett	1,320	45.2
Majority		280	
Turnout			38.5
Labour hold			

Torry
Party	Candidate	Votes	%
Labour	G. A. Whyte	2,927	81.9
Conservative	N. G. M. Dunnett	648	18.1
Majority		2,279	
Turnout			32.1
Labour hold			

Woodside
Party	Candidate	Votes	%
Labour	M. M. Bush	2,250	61.4
Conservative	G. M. Park	1,322	36.1
Communist	J. Brandie	93	2.5
Majority		928	
Turnout			38.2
Labour hold			
