= 1949 Aberdeen Corporation election =

Election

← 1947	May 3, 1949	1950 →

12 out of 37 seats of City of Aberdeen Council 19 seats needed for a majority
- Turnout: 46%
	First party	Second party	Third party
Party	Labour	Progressives	Communist
Seats won	7	5	0
Seats after	19 (Note: Including one Labour councilor with the whip removed but voting with the party.)	18	0
Seat change	0	▲1	0
Popular vote	25,846	29,235	1,862
Percentage	44.8%	50.7%	3.2%
	Fourth party
Party	Independent
Seats won	0
Seats after	0
Seat change	▼1
Popular vote	691
Percentage	1.2%
- Composition of Corporation after the election

An election to the Aberdeen Corporation was held on 3 May 1949, alongside municipal elections across Scotland. 12 of the corporation's 37 seats were up for election.

The election saw Labour retain their control over the corporation, although tenuously. Leading up to the election, Labour councillor Robert S. Lennox had the whip withdrawn, and was sitting as an independent. Despite this, Lennox still voted with Labour, allowing the party to keep control. The overall turnout for the election was 46%.

== Ward Results ==
Ferryhill
Party	Candidate	Votes	%
Progressives	Ian G. McPherson (incumbent)	2,682	71.7
Labour	Francis Brand	1,059	28.3
Majority		1,623	
Progressives hold			

Gilcomston
Party	Candidate	Votes	%
Labour	Dr May Baird (incumbent)	2,311	52.7
Progressives	J. Patrick Jeffery	2,071	47.3
Majority		240	
Labour hold			

Greyfriars
Party	Candidate	Votes	%
Labour	Collin MacIver	2,850	72.9
Independent	Alexander Riddell (incumbent) (Note: Ran as an Independent but Labour-aligned candidate.)	691	17.7
Communist	Robert H. Cooney	370	9.5
Majority		2,159	
Labour gain from Independent			

Holburn
Party	Candidate	Votes	%
Progressives	John Collins	2,012	59.8
Labour	Rev. Leonard Baker Short (incumbent)	1,355	40.2
Majority		657	
Progressives gain from Labour			

Rosemount
Party	Candidate	Votes	%
Progressives	George A. Anderson (incumbent)	3,408	71.4
Labour	John J. Adams	1,366	28.6
Majority		2,042	
Progressives hold			

Rubislaw
Party	Candidate	Votes	%
Progressives	James A. Mackie (incumbent)	4,447	84.5
Labour	George M. Thow	817	15.5
Majority		3,630	
Progressives hold			

Ruthrieston
Party	Candidate	Votes	%
Progressives	Andrew R. Abercrombie	5,132	77.1
Labour	Douglas Cummings	1,520	22.9
Majority		3,612	
Progressives hold			

St. Clements
Party	Candidate	Votes	%
Labour	George W. Davis (incumbent)	2,724	88.4
Communist	Robert F. Murray	316	11.6
Majority		2,408	
Labour hold			

St. Machar
Party	Candidate	Votes	%
Labour	William Yuill	3,442	51.9
Progressives	Gilbert F. Hamilton	2,757	41.6
Communist	Norman S. Simpson	435	6.6
Majority		685	
Labour hold			

St. Nicholas
Party	Candidate	Votes	%
Labour	John Robertson (incumbent)	1,612	56.1
Progressives	Robert Lobban	1,260	43.9
Majority		352	
Labour hold			

Torry
Party	Candidate	Votes	%
Labour	William Collins (incumbent)	2,851	58.8
Progressives	Sidney H. Robinson	1,700	35.0
Communist	Arthur Cryle	301	6.2
Majority		1,151	
Labour hold			

Woodside
Party	Candidate	Votes	%
Labour	Alexander Armet	3,939	48.4
Progressives	Patrick Mitchell	3,766	46.2
Communist	Mrs. Alice Milne	440	5.4
Majority		173	
Labour hold			
