= 1952 Aberdeen Corporation election =

Election

← 1951	May 6, 1952	1953 →

36 out of 37 seats of City of Aberdeen Council 19 seats needed for a majority
- Turnout: 47.0%
	First party	Second party	Third party
Party	Labour	Progressives	Communist
Seats won	21	15	0
Seats after	21	16	0
Seat change	4 ▲	4 ▼	0
Popular vote	77,307	51,318	836
Percentage	59.4%	39.5%	0.6%
	Fourth party
Party	Scottish Self-Government
Seats won	0
Seats after	0
Seat change	0
Popular vote	602
Percentage	0.5%
- Composition of Corporation after the election

An election to the Aberdeen Corporation was held on 6 May 1952, alongside municipal elections across Scotland. 36 of the corporation's 37 seats were up for election.

The election saw a large swing in favour of Labour, ending with a majority of 5 on the council. All seats were up for election as ward boundaries were redrawn and previously elected councilors' terms were cut short. This resulted in three seats being contested in each of the 12 wards. The 37th seat was that of the Dean of Guild, a member of the council appointed by the guilds of the city, who affiliated with the Progressives.

== Ward Results ==
Cairncry 3 Seats
Party	Candidate	Votes	%
Labour	R. S. Lennox (incumbent)	3,328	
Labour	J. Robertson (incumbent)	3,230	
Labour	J. Watt	3,060	
Progressives	R. Lobban	1,061	
Progressives	Mrs. Georgina Sutherland	931	
Majority		1,999	
Turnout			
Labour win (new seat)			
Labour win (new seat)			
Labour win (new seat)			

Ferryhill 3 Seats
Party	Candidate	Votes	%
Progressives	C. G. E. M'Iver (incumbent)	2,627	
Progressives	I. G. M'Pherson (incumbent)	2,607	
Progressives	A. M'Robb	2,419	
Labour	Rev. J. P. Crosgrove	2,397	
Majority		22	
Turnout			
Progressives win (new boundaries)			
Progressives win (new boundaries)			
Progressives win (new boundaries)			

Holburn 3 Seats
Party	Candidate	Votes	%
Progressives	G. Roberts (incumbent)	Unopposed	
Progressives	W. D. Reid (incumbent)	Unopposed	
Progressives	J. Collins (incumbent)	Unopposed	
Majority			
Turnout			
Progressives win (new boundaries)			
Progressives win (new boundaries)			
Progressives win (new boundaries)			

Rosemount 3 Seats
Party	Candidate	Votes	%
Progressives	J. Patrick Jeffrey (incumbent)	2,940	
Progressives	G. A. Anderson (incumbent)	2,868	
Progressives	W. D. Swinney (incumbent)	2,823	
Labour	H. Hepburn	1,384	
Majority		1,439	
Turnout			
Progressives win (new boundaries)			
Progressives win (new boundaries)			
Progressives win (new boundaries)			

Rubislaw 3 Seats
Party	Candidate	Votes	%
Progressives	A. T. Morrison (incumbent)	Unopposed	
Progressives	J. F. Hall (incumbent)	Unopposed	
Progressives	J. A. Mackie (incumbent)	Unopposed	
Majority			
Turnout			
Progressives win (new boundaries)			
Progressives win (new boundaries)			
Progressives win (new boundaries)			

Ruthrieston 3 Seats
Party	Candidate	Votes	%
Progressives	F. Magee (incumbent)	3,538	
Progressives	T. F. Aggett	3,402	
Progressives	T. Scott Sutherland	3,382	
Labour	K. Milton	2,218	
Majority		1,164	
Turnout			
Progressives win (new boundaries)			
Progressives win (new boundaries)			
Progressives win (new boundaries)			

St. Andrews 3 Seats
Party	Candidate	Votes	%
Labour	C. MacIver (incumbent)	3,735	
Labour	G. Stephen (incumbent)	3,682	
Labour	R. Bruce (incumbent)	3,661	
Progressives	G. H. Henderson	985	
Progressives	A. E. Buxton	869	
Majority		2,676	
Turnout			
Labour win (new seat)			
Labour win (new seat)			
Labour win (new seat)			

St. Clements 3 Seats
Party	Candidate	Votes	%
Labour	Dr. May Baird (incumbent)	4,009	
Labour	A. C. Collie (incumbent)	3,941	
Labour	W. K. Park (incumbent)	3,804	
Communist	R. H. Cooney	836	
Progressives	Mrs. B. E. Jeffrey	814	
Majority		2,968	
Turnout			
Labour win (new boundaries)			
Labour win (new boundaries)			
Labour win (new boundaries)			

St. Machar 3 Seats
Party	Candidate	Votes	%
Labour	Rev. Professor J. M. Graham (incumbent)	3,478	
Labour	R. A. Raffen (incumbent)	3,440	
Labour	J. D. Burgoyne	3,292	
Progressives	J. Kelly	1,531	
Progressives	J. T. L. Parkinson	1,451	
Progressives	D. J. P. Neave	1,426	
Majority		1,761	
Turnout			
Labour win (new boundaries)			
Labour win (new boundaries)			
Labour win (new boundaries)			

St. Nicholas 3 Seats
Party	Candidate	Votes	%
Labour	G. R. M'Intosh (incumbent)	3,788	
Labour	Mrs Violet L. A. Loutit	3,778	
Labour	R. M'Intyre	3,702	
Progressives	D. Henderson (incumbent)	2,609	
Progressives	J. S. G. Munro (incumbent)	2,525	
Progressives	F. M. Donald	2,337	
Majority		1,093	
Turnout			
Labour win (new boundaries)			
Labour win (new boundaries)			
Labour win (new boundaries)			

Torry 3 Seats
Party	Candidate	Votes	%
Labour	N. Hogg (incumbent)	3,128	
Labour	G. Fraser (incumbent)	3,066	
Labour	A. C. Ritchie (incumbent)	3,041	
Progressives	E. J. Gordon	1,032	
Majority		2,009	
Turnout			
Labour win (new boundaries)			
Labour win (new boundaries)			
Labour win (new boundaries)			

Woodside 3 Seats
Party	Candidate	Votes	%
Labour	W. Yuill (incumbent)	2,771	
Labour	C. M. Ross	2,746	
Labour	A. Morrice	2,628	
Progressives	L. T. Mutch (incumbent)	2,502	
Progressives	P. Mitchell (incumbent)	2,427	
Progressives	R. M. Eyres	2,212	
Scottish Self-Government	P. Hadden (Note: Hadden likely did not stand for the Scottish (Self-Government) Party as it had dissolved in 1934, but sources do not provide further information to identify the party listed.)	602	
Majority		126	
Turnout			
Labour win (new boundaries)			
Labour win (new boundaries)			
Labour win (new boundaries)			
