= 1950 Aberdeen Corporation election =

Election

← 1949	2 May 1950	1951 →

12 out of 37 seats of City of Aberdeen Council 19 seats needed for a majority
- Turnout: 39.4%▼
	First party	Second party	Third party
Party	Progressives	Labour	Communist
Seats won	1	0	0
Seats after	19	18	0
Seat change	1 ▲	1 ▼	0
Popular vote	26,652	19,509	1,874
Percentage	55.5%	40.6%	3.9%
- Composition of Corporation after the election

An election to the Aberdeen Corporation was held on 2 May 1950, alongside municipal elections across Scotland. 12 of the corporation's 37 seats were up for election.

The election saw the Progressives regain one seat from Labour in the Gilcomston Ward and hold a one-seat majority on the council. The overall turnout for the election was 39.4%.

== Ward Results ==
Ferryhill
Party	Candidate	Votes	%
Progressives	Gordon McIver	2,433	72.8
Labour	R. A. McIntyre	908	27.2
Majority		1,525	
Turnout			37.8
Progressives hold			

Gilcomston
Party	Candidate	Votes	%
Labour	A. Fraser Macintosh (incumbent)	1,754	72.4
Communist	Robert Cooney	667	27.6
Majority		1,087	
Turnout			51.2
Labour hold			

Greyfriars
Party	Candidate	Votes	%
Progressives	J. S. G. Munro	2,025	55.8
Labour	Robert A. Raffan (incumbent)	1,605	44.2
Majority		420	
Turnout			31.0
Progressives gain from Labour			

Holburn
Party	Candidate	Votes	%
Progressives	W. D. Reid (incumbent)	1,753	66.9
Labour	A. M. Morrice	869	33.1
Majority		884	
Turnout			38.3
Progressives hold			

Rosemount
Party	Candidate	Votes	%
Progressives	W. D. Swinney (incumbent)	3,143	77.1
Labour	J. D. Burgoyne	931	22.9
Majority		2,212	
Turnout			43.4
Progressives hold			

Rubislaw
Party	Candidate	Votes	%
Progressives	John F. Hall (incumbent)	4,165	87.8
Labour	Charles G. Gribble	581	12.2
Majority		3,584	
Turnout			52.8
Progressives hold			

Ruthrieston
Party	Candidate	Votes	%
Progressives	T. Scott Sutherland (incumbent)	4,636	79.9
Labour	Frank Brand	1,165	20.1
Majority		3,471	
Turnout			42.1
Progressives hold			

St. Clements
Party	Candidate	Votes	%
Labour	W. K. Park (incumbent)	1,745	81.5
Communist	James Dick	396	18.5
Majority		1,350	
Turnout			27.9
Labour hold			

St. Machar
Party	Candidate	Votes	%
Labour	Herbert G. Brechin (incumbent)	3,027	53.1
Progressives	Dr. Gilbert Hamilton	2,357	41.3
Communist	Stanley Simpson	318	5.6
Majority		670	
Turnout			35.0
Labour hold			

St. Nicholas
Party	Candidate	Votes	%
Labour	John M. Graham (incumbent)	1,355	58.4
Progressives	R. M. Eyres	965	41.6
Majority		390	
Turnout			39.9
Labour hold			

Torry
Party	Candidate	Votes	%
Labour	A. C. Ritchie (incumbent)	2,289	59.7
Progressives	A. M. Burns	1,545	40.3
Majority		744	
Turnout			35.3
Labour hold			

Woodside
Party	Candidate	Votes	%
Progressives	Patrick Mitchell	3,630	49.0
Labour	Norman Hogg	3,280	44.3
Communist	Archibald Lennox	493	6.7
Majority		350	
Turnout			38.6
Progressives hold			
