= 1954 Aberdeen Corporation election =

Election

← 1953	May 4, 1954	1955 →

13 out of 37 seats of City of Aberdeen Council 19 seats needed for a majority
- Turnout: 28.7% ▼
	First party	Second party	Third party
Party	Labour	Progressives	Scottish Self-Government
Seats won	7	6	0
Seats after	21	16	0
Seat change	0	0	0
Popular vote	12,110	8,804	1,033
Percentage	51.06%	37.12%	4.36%
	Fourth party	Fifth party
Party	Communist	Aberdeen Municipal Unionist Party
Seats won	0	0
Seats after	0	0
Seat change	0	0
Popular vote	900	868
Percentage	3.80%	3.66%
- Composition of Corporation after the election

An election to the Aberdeen Corporation was held on 4 May 1954, alongside municipal elections across Scotland. 13 of the corporation's 37 seats were up for election, although only 8 were contested.

This election marked a general disinterest from local voters, as turnout fell to the lowest amount that had ever been recorded in Aberdeen council elections. The Aberdeen Evening Express noted that less individuals voted in this election than had traveled to see Aberdeen F.C. play in the 1954 Scottish Cup Final in Glasgow a week prior. The Aberdeen Municipal Unionist Party was a new entrance this year.

== Ward results ==
Cairncry
Party	Candidate	Votes	%
Labour	Clifford K. Milton	2,252	89.19
Communist	John D. Brown	273	10.81
Majority		1,979	
Turnout		2,525	17.9
Labour hold			

Ferryhill
Party	Candidate	Votes	%
Progressives	Ian G. M'Pherson (incumbent)	2,261	53.58
Labour	James Gill	1,959	46.42
Majority		302	
Turnout		4,220	41.7
Progressives hold			

Holburn
Party	Candidate	Votes	%
Progressives	George Roberts (incumbent)	1,954	64
Labour	Christopher L. Kinnaird	1,099	36
Majority		855	
Turnout		3,053	29.8
Progressives hold			

Rosemount 2 Seats
Party	Candidate	Votes	%
Progressives	Major H. F. Workman	1,891	
Progressives	George A. Anderson (incumbent)	1,785	
Aberdeen Municipal Unionist Party	R. M. Eyres	868	
Scottish Self-Government	William Crockett	534	
Scottish Self-Government	William Sinclair	499	
Majority		917	
Turnout			30.9
Progressives hold			
Progressives hold			

Rubislaw
Party	Candidate	Votes	%
Progressives	W. Balfour Robb	Unopposed	
Progressives hold			

Ruthrieston
Party	Candidate	Votes	%
Progressives	T. F. Aggett (incumbent)	Unopposed	
Progressives hold			

St. Andrews
Party	Candidate	Votes	%
Labour	George Stephen (incumbent)	2,134	90.12
Communist	Andrew Smith	234	9.88
Majority		1,900	
Turnout		2,368	23.4
Labour hold			

St. Clements
Party	Candidate	Votes	%
Labour	Alexander C. Collie (incumbent)	2,178	84.71
Communist	James M. Aberdein	393	15.29
Majority		1,785	
Turnout		2,571	24.7
Labour hold			

St. Machar
Party	Candidate	Votes	%
Labour	R. A. Raffan (incumbent)	2,215	70.81
Progressives	J. Cormack Watt	913	29.18
Majority		1,302	
Turnout		3,128	32.7
Labour hold			

St. Nicholas
Party	Candidate	Votes	%
Labour	A. Anderson	Unopposed	
Labour hold			

Torry
Party	Candidate	Votes	%
Labour	Mrs. T. M. Allan	Unopposed	
Labour hold			

Woodside
Party	Candidate	Votes	%
Labour	C. M. Ross (incumbent)	Unopposed	
Labour hold			
