= 1963 Edinburgh Corporation election =

Local election in Scotland

- 7 May 1963

23 of the 69 seats to the Edinburgh Corporation 35 seats needed for a majority
| | First party | Second party | Third party |
|---|---|---|---|
| Party | Progressives | Labour | Liberal |
| Last election | 34 | 30 | 5 |
| Seats won | 12 | 10 | 1 |
| Seats after | 33 | 31 | 5 |
| Seat change | ▼1 | ▲1 | Steady |
| Popular vote | 46,392 | 50,991 | 27,742 |
| Percentage | 36.0% | 39.6% | 21.5% |
- Results by ward.
Council control before election
No overall control
Council control after election
No overall control

An election to the Edinburgh Corporation was held on 7 May 1963, alongside municipal elections across Scotland. Of the councils 69 seats, 23 were up for election.

After the election Edinburgh Corporation remained under No Overall Control, composed of 33 Progressives, 31 Labour councillors, and 5 Liberal.

== Aggregate results ==
Edinburgh Corporation election, 1963
| Party | Seats | Gains | Losses | Net gain/loss | Seats % | Votes % | Votes | +/− |
|---|---|---|---|---|---|---|---|---|
| Progressives | 12 | 0 | 1 | ▼1 | 52.2 | 36.0 | 46,392 | |
| Labour | 10 | 1 | 0 | ▲1 | 43.5 | 39.6 | 50,991 | |
| Liberal | 1 | 0 | 0 | Steady | 4.3 | 21.5 | 27,742 | |
| Unionist | 0 | 0 | 0 | Steady | 0.0 | 2.3 | 3,023 | |
| Communist | 0 | 0 | 0 | Steady | 0.0 | 0.4 | 518 | |
| Independent | 0 | 0 | 0 | Steady | 0.0 | 0.1 | 117 | |

== Ward results ==
Location of Broughton ward

Broughton
| Party | Candidate | Votes | % |
|---|---|---|---|
| Progressives | Melville Dinwiddie | 2,527 | |
| Liberal | Violet Macinnes | 1,287 | |
| Labour | Robert W. Irvine | 1,271 | |
| Majority | | 1,240 | |
| Turnout | | | 39.97 |
| Progressives hold | | | |

Location of Calton ward

Calton
| Party | Candidate | Votes | % |
|---|---|---|---|
| Progressives | Josephine M. Dickson | 2,497 | |
| Labour | Philip S. Wood | 2,271 | |
| Majority | | 226 | |
| Turnout | | | 41.84 |
| Progressives hold | | | |

Location of Central Leith ward

Central Leith
| Party | Candidate | Votes | % |
|---|---|---|---|
| Labour | John A. Chrichton | 3,032 | |
| Liberal | Alastair S. Buchanan | 915 | |
| Communist | Theodore C. Taylor | 125 | |
| Majority | | 2,317 | |
| Turnout | | | 33.90 |
| Labour hold | | | |

Location of Colinton ward

Colinton
| Party | Candidate | Votes | % |
|---|---|---|---|
| Progressives | Maurice F. Ferry | 3,888 | |
| Labour | Harold Hauxwell | 2,835 | |
| Liberal | John E. Henderson | 1,411 | |
| Majority | | 1,053 | |
| Turnout | | | 46.27 |
| Progressives hold | | | |

Location of Corstorphine ward

Corstorphine
| Party | Candidate | Votes | % |
|---|---|---|---|
| Progressives | Mary R. Murray | 4,187 | |
| Liberal | Thomas M. Frew | 2,681 | |
| Labour | Chrisina S. Guest | 987 | |
| Majority | | 1,506 | |
| Turnout | | | 50.34 |
| Progressives hold | | | |

Location of Craigentinny ward

Craigentinny
| Party | Candidate | Votes | % |
|---|---|---|---|
| Labour | Alexander Sutherland | 3,916 | |
| Progressives | Harold Oppenheim | 2,794 | |
| Majority | | 1,122 | |
| Turnout | | | 45.59 |
| Labour hold | | | |

Location of Craigmillar ward

Craigmillar
| Party | Candidate | Votes | % |
|---|---|---|---|
| Labour | Russell A. Fox | 2,392 | |
| Communist | Michal D'Arcy | 132 | |
| Majority | | 2,260 | |
| Turnout | | | 26.42 |
| Labour hold | | | |

Location of George Square ward

George Square
| Party | Candidate | Votes | % |
|---|---|---|---|
| Progressives | John F. Stewart | 1,884 | |
| Liberal | John G. Gray | 1,592 | |
| Labour | Eva Gibbons | 663 | |
| Majority | | 292 | |
| Turnout | | | 38.18 |
| Progressives hold | | | |

Location of Gorgie-Dalry ward

Gorgie-Dalry
| Party | Candidate | Votes | % |
|---|---|---|---|
| Labour | Thomas McGregor | 2,676 | |
| Liberal | James L. McBeath | 1,742 | |
| Independent | Ian G. Haxton | 117 | |
| Majority | | 934 | |
| Turnout | | | 33.36 |
| Labour hold | | | |

Location of Holyrood ward

Holyrood
| Party | Candidate | Votes | % |
|---|---|---|---|
| Labour | Owen Hand | 1,814 | |
| Liberal | Arthur C. Fiddler | 900 | |
| Communist | John Ashton | 71 | |
| Majority | | 914 | |
| Turnout | | | 31.42 |
| Labour hold | | | |

Location of Liberton ward

Liberton
| Party | Candidate | Votes | % |
|---|---|---|---|
| Labour | James W. Kerr | 4,907 | |
| Progressives | Brenda A. W. Pope | 2,981 | |
| Liberal | George Carse | 1,038 | |
| Majority | | 1,926 | |
| Turnout | | | 43.93 |
| Labour hold | | | |

Location of Merchiston ward

Merchiston
| Party | Candidate | Votes | % |
|---|---|---|---|
| Progressives | Thomas Morgan | 2,606 | |
| Liberal | James R. Dalrymple | 2,183 | |
| Labour | Sylvia Renilson | 915 | |
| Majority | | 423 | |
| Turnout | | | 49.69 |
| Progressives hold | | | |

Location of Morningside ward

Morningside
| Party | Candidate | Votes | % |
|---|---|---|---|
| Progressives | Arthur G. Ingham | 3,749 | |
| Liberal | Margaret A. M. Mackay | 1,488 | |
| Majority | | 2,261 | |
| Turnout | | | 39.41 |
| Progressives hold | | | |

Location of Murrayfield-Cramond ward

Murrayfield-Cramond
| Party | Candidate | Votes | % |
|---|---|---|---|
| Progressives | Hugh Macpherson | 4,162 | |
| Labour | James Renilson | 1,838 | |
| Liberal | Ronald McNeill | 1,402 | |
| Majority | | 2324 | |
| Turnout | | | 43.15 |
| Progressives hold | | | |

Location of Newington ward

Newington
| Party | Candidate | Votes | % |
|---|---|---|---|
| Liberal | Hilda Morton | 3,549 | |
| Unionist | Graeme H. Menzies | 3,023 | |
| Labour | John McEwan | 1,469 | |
| Majority | | 526 | |
| Turnout | | | 49.96 |
| Liberal hold | | | |

Location of Pilton ward

Pilton
| Party | Candidate | Votes | % |
|---|---|---|---|
| Labour | James M. R. Durkin | 4,129 | |
| Liberal | Cyril Huxtabie | 1,419 | |
| Communist | Charles McManus | 190 | |
| Majority | | 2,710 | |
| Turnout | | | 33.01 |
| Labour hold | | | |

Location of Portobello ward

Portobello
| Party | Candidate | Votes | % |
|---|---|---|---|
| Progressives | Kenneth W. Borthwick | 3,687 | |
| Labour | Phyllis Herriot | 2,989 | |
| Liberal | Keith Milton | 1,181 | |
| Majority | | 698 | |
| Turnout | | 7,857 | |
| Progressives hold | | | |

Location of Sighthill ward

Sighthill
| Party | Candidate | Votes | % |
|---|---|---|---|
| Labour | William Wallace | 3,151 | |
| Liberal | Judith Steel | 1,546 | |
| Majority | | 1,905 | |
| Turnout | | | 33.11 |
| Labour hold | | | |

Location of South Leith

South Leith
| Party | Candidate | Votes | % |
|---|---|---|---|
| Labour | Alexander Burton | 3,935 | |
| Progressives | Peter Heatly | 3,185 | |
| Majority | | 750 | |
| Turnout | | | 52.53 |
| Labour gain from Progressives | | | |

Location of St Andrews ward

St. Andrews
| Party | Candidate | Votes | % |
|---|---|---|---|
| Progressives | Robert McLaughlin | 1,608 | |
| Labour | Hugh M. W. Kinnear | 750 | |
| Liberal | Robert E. Henderson | 631 | |
| Majority | | 858 | |
| Turnout | | | 27.67 |
| Progressives hold | | | |

Location of St Bernards ward

St. Bernards
| Party | Candidate | Votes | % |
|---|---|---|---|
| Progressives | David A. Adamson | 3,634 | |
| Labour | Ian McLaughlan | 1,702 | |
| Liberal | Marion M. Ritchie | 1,518 | |
| Majority | | 1,932 | |
| Turnout | | | 39.42 |
| Progressives hold | | | |

Location of St Giles ward

St. Giles
| Party | Candidate | Votes | % |
|---|---|---|---|
| Labour | James McInally | 1,974 | |
| Liberal | William Wilson | 1,171 | |
| Majority | | | |
| Turnout | | | 25.70 |
| Labour hold | | | |

Location of West Leith ward

West Leith
| Party | Candidate | Votes | % |
|---|---|---|---|
| Progressives | John Scott | 3,003 | |
| Labour | Sarah F. Skinner | 1,375 | |
| Liberal | Peter E. Taylor | 1,003 | |
| Majority | | 1,628 | |
| Turnout | | | 45.47 |
| Progressives hold | | | |
