= 1956 Aberdeen Corporation election =

Election

- May 1, 1956

12 out of 37 seats of City of Aberdeen Council 19 seats needed for a majority
- Turnout: 19.4% ▼
	First party	Second party	Third party
Party	Labour	Progressives	SNP
Seats won	7	5	0
Seats after	21	16	0
Seat change	0	0	0
Popular vote	7,868	3,596	526
Percentage	60.74%	27.76%	4.06%
	Fourth party	Fifth party
Party	Communist	Scottish National Congress
Seats won	0	0
Seats after	0	0
Seat change	0	0
Popular vote	482	481
Percentage	3.72%	3.71%
- Composition of Corporation after the election

An election to the Aberdeen Corporation was held on 1 May 1956, alongside municipal elections across Scotland. 12 of the corporation's 37 seats were up for election, although only 6 were contested.

This election set a record for low turnout rate for the third year in a row, with turnout dropping to below 20% for the first time ever. While just shy of 13,000 electors voted in this election, the estimated attendance at the Aberdeen F.C. match just three days prior was 16,000. From 1952 to 1955, the Scottish nationalist vote was captured by the Scottish Self-Government Party. In this election, members and former candidates switched to supporting either the Scottish National Party or the Scottish National Congress. These new affiliations and record low turnout resulted in a much closer race in the St. Nicholas ward, with Labour's majority dropping from 921 to 366.

== Ward results ==
Cairncry
Party	Candidate	Votes	%
Labour	John McM. Watt (incumbent)	2,058	81.06
Scottish National Congress	William Sinclair	481	18.94
Majority		1,577	
Turnout		2,539	14.41
Labour hold			

Ferryhill
Party	Candidate	Votes	%
Progressives	A. McRobb (incumbent)	Unopposed	
Progressives hold			

Holburn
Party	Candidate	Votes	%
Progressives	W. D. Reid (incumbent)	Unopposed	
Progressives hold			

Rosemount
Party	Candidate	Votes	%
Progressives	James Thomson (incumbent)	2,091	76.76
Labour	Norman D. Fraser	633	23.24
Majority		1,458	
Turnout		2,724	31.58
Progressives hold			

Rubislaw
Party	Candidate	Votes	%
Progressives	J. Scott MacLachlan (incumbent)	Unopposed	
Progressives hold			

Ruthrieston
Party	Candidate	Votes	%
Progressives	T. Scott Sutherland (incumbent)	Unopposed	
Progressives hold			

St. Andrews
Party	Candidate	Votes	%
Labour	R. McG. Bruce (incumbent)	Unopposed	
Labour hold			

St. Clements
Party	Candidate	Votes	%
Labour	William K. Park (incumbent)	1,326	87.01
Communist	Margaret Rose	198	12.99
Majority		1,128	
Turnout		1,524	16.18
Labour hold			

St. Machar
Party	Candidate	Votes	%
Labour	John D. Burgoyne (incumbent)	1,304	82.12
Communist	Andrew Smith	284	17.88
Majority		1,020	
Turnout		1,588	17.40
Labour hold			

St. Nicholas
Party	Candidate	Votes	%
Labour	Robert A. McIntyre (incumbent)	892	62.91
SNP	Thomas W. Crockett	526	37.09
Majority		366	
Turnout		1,418	12.67
Labour hold			

Torry
Party	Candidate	Votes	%
Labour	Ellen Williamson	Unopposed	
Labour hold			

Woodside
Party	Candidate	Votes	%
Labour	Sidney Fyfe	1,655	52.37
Progressives	Thomas H. Murdoch	1,505	47.63
Majority		150	
Turnout		3,160	29.29
Labour hold			
