= 1974 Shetland Islands Council election =

1974 Scottish local government election

← 1973	May 7, 1974	1978 →

All 22 seats to Shetland Islands Council 12 seats needed for a majority
	First party	Second party
Leader	A.I. Tulloch
Party	Independent	Labour
Leader's seat	Aithsting and Sandsting
Seats won	18	4
Popular vote	3,781	430
Percentage	89.8%	10.2%
Council Convener after election
A.I. Tulloch
Independent

Elections to the Shetland Islands Council were held on 7 May 1974 as part of Scottish local elections. This was the first election for the all-purpose Shetland Islands Council, as established by the Local Government (Scotland) Act 1973, combining the Lerwick Town Council and the Zetland County Council. The Council operated as a shadow authority until May 1975, when it assumed full responsibilities for local government in Shetland. 11 seats were uncontested.

== Aggregate results ==
Shetland Islands Council election, 1974
Party	Seats	Gains	Losses	Net gain/loss	Seats %	Votes %	Votes	+/−
Independent	18	N/A	N/A	N/A	84.0	89.8	3,781	N/A
Labour	4	N/A	N/A	N/A	6.0	10.2	430	N/A

== Ward results ==
Aithsting and Sandsting
Party	Candidate	Votes	%
Independent	A.I. Tulloch	291	55.3%
Independent	Robert Garrick	235	44.7%
Majority		56	10.6%

Bressay
Party	Candidate	Votes	%
Independent	James Irvine	unopposed	unopposed
Majority		unopposed	unopposed

Burra and Trondra
Party	Candidate	Votes	%
Independent	William Cumming	225	78.1%
Independent	Victor Church	63	21.9%
Majority		162	56.2%

Delting
Party	Candidate	Votes	%
Independent	Fraser Peterson	232	66.7%
Independent	Clem Robb	116	33.3%
Majority		116	33.4%

Dunrossness
Party	Candidate	Votes	%
Independent	James Leask	258	55.4%
Independent	Raymond Bentley	208	44.6%
Majority		50	10.8%

Gulberwick, Quarff and Cunningsburgh
Party	Candidate	Votes	%
Independent	Joan McLeod	248	69.7%
Independent	Angus Smith	108	30.3%
Majority		130	39.4%

Lerwick Breiwick
Party	Candidate	Votes	%
Labour	John Butler	141	39.1%
Independent	Harry Gray	125	34.6%
Independent	Ronald Cumming	95	26.6%
Majority		16	4.5%

Lerwick Central
Party	Candidate	Votes	%
Independent	Eric Gray	219	59.5%
Independent	Robert Wishart	149	40.5%
Majority		70	19.0%

Lerwick North
Party	Candidate	Votes	%
Labour	Alex Morrison	unopposed	unopposed
Majority		unopposed	unopposed

Lerwick Sound
Party	Candidate	Votes	%
Independent	William Peterson	unopposed	unopposed
Majority		unopposed	unopposed

Lerwick Twageos
Party	Candidate	Votes	%
Labour	James Paton	289	58.7%
Independent	George Blance	203	41.3%
Majority		86	17.4%

Lerwick West
Party	Candidate	Votes	%
Labour	Bill Smith	unopposed	unopposed
Majority		unopposed	unopposed

Nesting
Party	Candidate	Votes	%
Independent	Edward Thomason	unopposed	unopposed
Majority		unopposed	unopposed

Northmavine
Party	Candidate	Votes	%
Independent	John Jamieson	unopposed	unopposed
Majority		unopposed	unopposed

Sandness and Walls
Party	Candidate	Votes	%
Independent	Williamina Tait	206	65.4%
Independent	Peter Garrick	109	34.6%
Majority		97	30.8%

Sandwick
Party	Candidate	Votes	%
Independent	Thomas Stove	unopposed	unopposed
Majority		unopposed	unopposed

Scalloway
Party	Candidate	Votes	%
Independent	Andrew Irvine	unopposed	unopposed
Majority		unopposed	unopposed

Unst
Party	Candidate	Votes	%
Independent	Alan Fraser	225	56.7%
Independent	William Thomson	172	43.3%
Majority		53	13.4%

Whalsay and Skerries
Party	Candidate	Votes	%
Independent	Frederick Dainty	unopposed	unopposed
Majority		unopposed	unopposed

Whiteness, Weisdale and Tingwall
Party	Candidate	Votes	%
Independent	John Johnson	164	55.8%
Independent	John Rae	81	27.6%
Independent	George Morrison	49	16.7%
Majority		83	28.2%

Yell North and Fetlar
Party	Candidate	Votes	%
Independent	David Johnson	unopposed	unopposed
Majority		unopposed	unopposed

Yell South
Party	Candidate	Votes	%
Independent	Stewart Gray	unopposed	unopposed
Majority		unopposed	unopposed

== By-elections since 1974 ==
1976 Lerwick Sound by-election
Party	Candidate	Votes	%
Independent	Ian Byrne	unopposed	unopposed
Majority		unopposed	unopposed
Independent hold			

1977 Dunrossness by-election
Party	Candidate	Votes	%
Independent	Prophet Smith	143	34.5%
Independent	Ray Bentley	123	29.7%
Independent	Alan Whitfield	93	22.5%
Independent	Williamina Flaws	55	13.3%
Majority		20	4.8%
Independent hold			
