= 1970 Zetland County Council election =

1970 Scottish local government election

| ← 1967 | May 12, 1970 | 1973 → |

24 of 33 seats on the Zetland County Council 17 seats needed for a majority
| | First party |
|---|---|
| Leader | Robert Johnson |
| Party | Independent |
| Leader's seat | Gulberwick and Quarff |
| Seats won | 24 |
| Seat change | - |
| Popular vote | 1,043 |
| Percentage | 100.0% |
| Swing | - |
Council Convener before election
Robert Johnson
Independent
Council Convener after election
Robert Johnson
Independent

Elections to the Zetland County Council were held on 12 May 1970 as part of Scottish local elections. Elections were held in every part of Shetland except Lerwick to elect 24 landward members to the County Council, who would be joined by nine nominated members from the Lerwick Town Council. Only five of 24 seats were contested.

Incumbent Council Convener Robert Johnson was unanimously re-elected for a second term after the election but would only serve a further two months until his death in July, after which Edward Thomason was elected to the position.

== Election results ==
Zetland County Council Election Result 1970
| Party | Seats | Gains | Losses | Net gain/loss | Seats % | Votes % | Votes | +/− |
|---|---|---|---|---|---|---|---|---|
| Independent | 24 | 0 | 0 | - | 100.0% | 100.0% | 1,042 | - |

== Ward results ==
Aithsting
| Party | Candidate | Votes | % |
|---|---|---|---|
| Independent | Robert Garrick (Incumbent) | 161 | 56.5% |
| Independent | Iain Caldwell | 124 | 43.5% |
| Majority | | 37 | 13.0% |
| Independent hold | | | |

Bressay
| Party | Candidate | Votes | % |
|---|---|---|---|
| Independent | James Irvine | 79 | 47.0% |
| Independent | John Scott (Incumbent) | 56 | 33.3% |
| Independent | Tom Black | 33 | 19.6% |
| Majority | | 23 | 13.7% |
| Independent hold | | | |

Burra
| Party | Candidate | Votes | % |
|---|---|---|---|
| | No nominations | | |

Cunningsburgh
| Party | Candidate | Votes | % |
|---|---|---|---|
| Independent | John McLeod (Incumbent) | unopposed | unopposed |
| Majority | | unopposed | unopposed |
| Independent hold | | | |

Delting North
| Party | Candidate | Votes | % |
|---|---|---|---|
| Independent | Fraser Peterson | unopposed | unopposed |
| Majority | | unopposed | unopposed |
| Independent hold | | | |

Delting South
| Party | Candidate | Votes | % |
|---|---|---|---|
| Independent | William Robb | unopposed | unopposed |
| Majority | | unopposed | unopposed |
| Independent hold | | | |

Dunrossness North
| Party | Candidate | Votes | % |
|---|---|---|---|
| Independent | Iain Campbell (Incumbent) | unopposed | unopposed |
| Majority | | unopposed | unopposed |
| Independent hold | | | |

Dunrossness South
| Party | Candidate | Votes | % |
|---|---|---|---|
| Independent | Raymond Bentley (Incumbent) | unopposed | unopposed |
| Majority | | unopposed | unopposed |
| Independent hold | | | |

Fetlar
| Party | Candidate | Votes | % |
|---|---|---|---|
| Independent | John Laurenson | unopposed | unopposed |
| Majority | | unopposed | unopposed |
| Independent hold | | | |

Gulberwick and Quarff
| Party | Candidate | Votes | % |
|---|---|---|---|
| Independent | Robert Johnson (Incumbent) | unopposed | unopposed |
| Majority | | unopposed | unopposed |
| Independent hold | | | |

Nesting and Lunnasting
| Party | Candidate | Votes | % |
|---|---|---|---|
| Independent | William Hamilton (Incumbent) | unopposed | unopposed |
| Majority | | unopposed | unopposed |
| Independent hold | | | |

Northmavine North
| Party | Candidate | Votes | % |
|---|---|---|---|
| Independent | Andrew Cromarty (Incumbent) | unopposed | unopposed |
| Majority | | unopposed | unopposed |
| Independent hold | | | |

Northmavine South
| Party | Candidate | Votes | % |
|---|---|---|---|
| Independent | Hugh Sutherland (Incumbent) | unopposed | unopposed |
| Majority | | unopposed | unopposed |
| Independent hold | | | |

Sandness
| Party | Candidate | Votes | % |
|---|---|---|---|
| Independent | George Morrison | 68 | 82.9% |
| Independent | Magnus Cheyne | 14 | 17.1% |
| Majority | | 37 | 13.0% |
| Independent hold | | | |

Sandsting
| Party | Candidate | Votes | % |
|---|---|---|---|
| Independent | A.I. Tulloch (Incumbent) | unopposed | unopposed |
| Majority | | unopposed | unopposed |
| Independent hold | | | |

Sandwick
| Party | Candidate | Votes | % |
|---|---|---|---|
| Independent | Thomas Stove | 199 | 70.1% |
| Independent | George Jamieson | 52 | 18.3% |
| Independent | Peter Duncan | 33 | 11.6% |
| Majority | | 147 | 51.8% |
| Independent hold | | | |

Tingwall
| Party | Candidate | Votes | % |
|---|---|---|---|
| Independent | Andrew Irvine (Incumbent) | unopposed | unopposed |
| Majority | | unopposed | unopposed |
| Independent hold | | | |

Unst North
| Party | Candidate | Votes | % |
|---|---|---|---|
| Independent | Edward Thomason (Incumbent) | 141 | 62.9% |
| Independent | Alexander Lamb | 83 | 37.1% |
| Majority | | 58 | 23.8% |
| Independent hold | | | |

Unst South
| Party | Candidate | Votes | % |
|---|---|---|---|
| Independent | Alan Fraser | unopposed | unopposed |
| Majority | | unopposed | unopposed |
| Independent hold | | | |

Walls
| Party | Candidate | Votes | % |
|---|---|---|---|
| Independent | Williamina Tait | unopposed | unopposed |
| Majority | | unopposed | unopposed |
| Independent hold | | | |

Whalsay and Skerries
| Party | Candidate | Votes | % |
|---|---|---|---|
| Independent | James Pottinger | unopposed | unopposed |
| Majority | | unopposed | unopposed |
| Independent hold | | | |

Whiteness and Weisdale
| Party | Candidate | Votes | % |
|---|---|---|---|
| | No nominations | | |

Yell North
| Party | Candidate | Votes | % |
|---|---|---|---|
| Independent | Hugh Williamson | unopposed | unopposed |
| Majority | | unopposed | unopposed |
| Independent hold | | | |

Yell South
| Party | Candidate | Votes | % |
|---|---|---|---|
| Independent | Robert Gray | unopposed | unopposed |
| Majority | | unopposed | unopposed |
| Independent hold | | | |

== By-elections since 1970 ==
1970 Burra by-election
| Party | Candidate | Votes | % |
|---|---|---|---|
| Independent | Barbara Anderson | unopposed | unopposed |
| Majority | | unopposed | unopposed |
| Independent hold | | | |

1970 Whiteness and Weisdale by-election
| Party | Candidate | Votes | % |
|---|---|---|---|
| Independent | John Rae | unopposed | unopposed |
| Majority | | unopposed | unopposed |
| Independent hold | | | |

1970 Gulberwick and Quarff by-election
| Party | Candidate | Votes | % |
|---|---|---|---|
| Independent | Arthur Irvine | unopposed | unopposed |
| Majority | | unopposed | unopposed |
| Independent hold | | | |

1971 Dunrossness North by-election
| Party | Candidate | Votes | % |
|---|---|---|---|
| Independent | James Leask | 55 | 78.6% |
| Independent | Mary Fisher | 15 | 21.4% |
| Majority | | 40 | 57.2% |
| Independent hold | | | |

1972 Northmavine South by-election
| Party | Candidate | Votes | % |
|---|---|---|---|
| Independent | John Jamieson | unopposed | unopposed |
| Majority | | unopposed | unopposed |
| Independent hold | | | |

1972 Burra by-election
| Party | Candidate | Votes | % |
|---|---|---|---|
| Independent | William Cumming | unopposed | unopposed |
| Majority | | unopposed | unopposed |
| Independent hold | | | |
