= 1973 Zetland County Council election =

Part of 1973 Scottish local elections

← 1970	May 8, 1973	1974 →

24 of 30 seats on the Zetland County Council 16 seats needed for a majority
	First party	Second party
Leader	Edward Thomason	Clem Robb
Party	Independent	Shetland Democratic Group
Leader's seat	Unst North (defeated)	Delting South
Seats won	13	11
Seat change	▼11	▲11
Popular vote	2,078	566
Percentage	78.6%	21.4%
Swing	▼21.4	▲21.4
Council Convener before election
Edward Thomason
Independent
Council Convener after election
George Blance
Independent

Elections to the Zetland County Council were held on 8 May 1973 as part of Scottish local elections. This was the last election for the County Council before its incorporation along with the Lerwick Town Council into the Shetland Islands Council in 1975. Elections were held in every part of Shetland except Lerwick to elect 24 landward members to the County Council, who would be joined by six nominated members from the Lerwick Town Council.

The election saw an unusually partisan competition between supporters and opponents of the County Council's policy on North Sea oil. The Shetland Democratic Group was formed to oppose the council's attempts to gain private legislation to exert direct control over oil developments in Shetland, objecting to proposals that would allow the council to take equity in industrial development and gain compulsory purchase powers.

The Shetland Democratic Group gained 11 seats and defeated incumbent Convener Edward Thomason but failed to win enough support to gain control of the Zetland County Council. Supporters of the council's policy elected George Blance, a nominated member from the Lerwick Town Council, as the council's final Convener, defeating Shetland Democratic Group member John Jamieson by 18 votes to 12. The council's continued support for private legislation led to the passage of the Zetland County Council Act 1974, providing the council with powers to become a harbour authority, control harbour developments, invest in securities of bodies corporate, implement compulsory purchases in specified areas relating to oil developments and to establish a reserve fund from oil revenues. These powers would be inherited by the Shetland Islands Council in 1975.

13 seats were uncontested, including seven of the Shetland Democratic Group's 11 gains.

== Election results ==
Zetland County Council Election Result 1973
Party	Seats	Gains	Losses	Net gain/loss	Seats %	Votes %	Votes	+/−
Independent	13	0	11	▼11	54.2%	78.6%	2,078	▼21.4
Shetland Democratic Group	11	11	0	▲11	45.8%	21.4%	566	▲21.4

== Ward results ==
Aithsting
Party	Candidate	Votes	%
Shetland Democratic Group	Iain Caldwell	151	54.9%
Independent	Robert Garrick (Incumbent)	124	45.1%
Majority		27	9.8%
Shetland Democratic Group gain from Independent			

Bressay
Party	Candidate	Votes	%
Independent	James Irvine (Incumbent)	122	78.2%
Independent	Brenda Scott	34	20.8%
Majority		88	57.4%
Independent hold			

Burra
Party	Candidate	Votes	%
Independent	William Cumming (Incumbent)	unopposed	unopposed
Majority		unopposed	unopposed
Independent hold			

Cunningsburgh
Party	Candidate	Votes	%
Shetland Democratic Group	Joan McLeod (Incumbent)	unopposed	unopposed
Majority		unopposed	unopposed
Shetland Democratic Group gain from Independent			

Delting North
Party	Candidate	Votes	%
Shetland Democratic Group	Fraser Peterson (Incumbent)	unopposed	unopposed
Majority		unopposed	unopposed
Shetland Democratic Group gain from Independent			

Delting South
Party	Candidate	Votes	%
Shetland Democratic Group	Clem Robb (Incumbent)	unopposed	unopposed
Majority		unopposed	unopposed
Shetland Democratic Group gain from Independent			

Dunrossness North
Party	Candidate	Votes	%
Shetland Democratic Group	James Leask (Incumbent)	unopposed	unopposed
Majority		unopposed	unopposed
Shetland Democratic Group gain from Independent			

Dunrossness South
Party	Candidate	Votes	%
Independent	Raymond Bentley (Incumbent)	150	63.3%
Independent	Arthur M. Irvine	87	36.7%
Majority		63	26.6%
Independent hold			

Fetlar
Party	Candidate	Votes	%
Independent	John Laurenson (Incumbent)	unopposed	unopposed
Majority		unopposed	unopposed
Independent hold			

Gulberwick and Quarff
Party	Candidate	Votes	%
Independent	Arthur Irvine (Incumbent)	45	51.4%
Shetland Democratic Group	Alistair Leask	43	48.6%
Majority		2	2.8%
Independent hold			

Nesting and Lunnasting
Party	Candidate	Votes	%
Independent	Andrew Riddell	149	68.3%
Independent	William Hamilton (Incumbent)	69	31.7%
Majority		80	36.6%
Independent hold			

Northmavine North
Party	Candidate	Votes	%
Shetland Democratic Group	Robert Balfour	46	55.4%
Independent	Andrew Cromarty (Incumbent)	37	44.6%
Majority		9	10.8%
Shetland Democratic Group gain from Independent			

Northmavine South
Party	Candidate	Votes	%
Shetland Democratic Group	John Jamieson (Incumbent)	unopposed	unopposed
Majority		unopposed	unopposed
Shetland Democratic Group gain from Independent			

Sandness
Party	Candidate	Votes	%
Independent	Peter Garriock	unopposed	unopposed
Majority		unopposed	unopposed
Independent hold			

Sandsting
Party	Candidate	Votes	%
Independent	A.I. Tulloch (Incumbent)	unopposed	unopposed
Majority		unopposed	unopposed
Independent hold			

Sandwick
Party	Candidate	Votes	%
Shetland Democratic Group	Thomas Stove (Incumbent)	unopposed	unopposed
Majority		unopposed	unopposed
Shetland Democratic Group gain from Independent			

Tingwall
Party	Candidate	Votes	%
Independent	Andrew Irvine (Incumbent)	327	55.7%
Independent	Martin Williamson	260	44.3%
Majority		67	11.4%
Independent hold			

Unst North
Party	Candidate	Votes	%
Shetland Democratic Group	William Thomson	249	70.5%
Independent	Edward Thomason (Incumbent)	104	29.5%
Majority		145	41.0%
Shetland Democratic Group gain from Independent			

Unst South
Party	Candidate	Votes	%
Shetland Democratic Group	Alan Fraser (Incumbent)	unopposed	unopposed
Majority		unopposed	unopposed
Shetland Democratic Group gain from Independent			

Walls
Party	Candidate	Votes	%
Independent	Williamina Tait (Incumbent)	195	79.9%
Independent	Peter Hick	49	20.1%
Majority		146	59.8%
Independent hold			

Whalsay and Skerries
Party	Candidate	Votes	%
Independent	Frederick Dainty	unopposed	unopposed
Majority		unopposed	unopposed
Independent hold			

Whiteness and Weisdale
Party	Candidate	Votes	%
Shetland Democratic Group	John Johnson	77	37.0%
Independent	John Rae (Incumbent)	67	32.2%
Independent	George Morrison	64	30.8%
Majority		10	4.8%
Shetland Democratic Group gain from Independent			

Yell North
Party	Candidate	Votes	%
Independent	Sandy Cluness	156	80.0%
Independent	Robert Manson	39	20.0%
Majority		117	60.0%
Independent hold			

Yell South
Party	Candidate	Votes	%
Independent	Robert Gray	unopposed	unopposed
Majority		unopposed	unopposed
Independent hold			

== By-elections since 1973 ==
1974 Yell North by-election
Party	Candidate	Votes	%
Independent	David Johnson	unopposed	unopposed
Majority		unopposed	unopposed
Independent hold			
