= 1967 Edinburgh Corporation election =

Local election in Scotland

- 2 May 1967

25 of the 69 seats to the Edinburgh Corporation 35 seats needed for a majority
	First party	Second party
Party	Progressives	Labour
Last election	36	32
Seats won	37	29
Seat change	▲	Steady
Popular vote	50,655	32,084
Percentage	44.4%	28.1%
	Third party	Fourth party
Party	Conservative	Liberal
Last election	0	1
Seats after	2	1
Seat change	▼	▼
Popular vote	7,588	11,772
Percentage	6.7%	10.3%
- Results by ward.
Council control before election
Progressives
Council control after election
Progressives

An Election to the Edinburgh Corporation was held on 2 May 1967, alongside municipal elections across Scotland. Of the councils 69 seats, 24 were up for election; two in Liberton and St. Andrew's wards, and one in every other ward.

After the election, Edinburgh Corporation was composed of 37 Progressives, 29 Labour councillors, 2 Conservatives, and 1 Liberal. The Progressives increased their majority to five seats.

== Aggregate results ==
Edinburgh Corporation election, 1967
Party	Seats	Gains	Losses	Net gain/loss	Seats %	Votes %	Votes	+/−
Progressives	14	2	1	▲1	56.0	44.4	50,655	
Labour	9	0	3	▼3		28.1	32,084	
Conservative	2	2	0	▲2		6.7	7,588	
Liberal	0	0	0	▲	0.0	10.3	11,772	
SNP	0	0	0	Steady	0.0	7.8	8,870	
Communist	0	0	0	Steady	0.0	2.7	3,045	

== Ward results ==
Location of Broughton ward

Broughton
Party	Candidate	Votes	%
Progressives	Leonard A. Bailey	2,464	
Liberal	Eric W. Hall	1,603	
Labour	Ian R. Hoy	1,154	
Majority		861	
Progressives hold			

Location of Calton ward

Calton
Party	Candidate	Votes	%
Progressives	Catherine B. M. Filsell	5,327	
Labour	James E. Boyack	1,886	
Majority		3441	
Labour hold			

Location of Central Leith ward

Central Leith
Party	Candidate	Votes	%
Labour	Barbara Woodburn	1,472	
SNP	Mary G. Thomson	1,377	
Communist	Theodore C. Taylor	153	
Majority		95	
Labour hold			

Location of Colinton ward

Colinton
Party	Candidate	Votes	%
Progressives	Victor J. Symes	2,223	
Labour	Philip S. Wood	2,023	
Majority		200	
Progressives gain from Labour			

Location of Corstorphine ward

Corstorphine
Party	Candidate	Votes	%
Progressives	Rupert Speyer	3,682	
Liberal	Thomas M. Frew	2,122	
SNP	William W. Neil	1,696	
Majority		1,560	
Progressives hold			

Location of Craigentinny ward

Craigentinny
Party	Candidate	Votes	%
Labour	Phyllis Herriot	1,857	
Conservative	Geraldine R. Johnston	293	
Majority		1,564	
Labour hold			

Location of Craigmillar ward

Craigmillar
Party	Candidate	Votes	%
Labour	John Kane	2,842	
Communist	Geraldine R. Johnston	2,534	
Majority		308	
Labour hold			

Location of George Square ward

George Square
Party	Candidate	Votes	%
Progressives	James Slack	1,803	
Labour	George Foulkes	788	
Liberal	Fiona M. Cowles	602	
Majority		1,015	
Progressives hold			

Location of Gorgie-Dalry ward

Gorgie-Dalry
Party	Candidate	Votes	%
Labour	Donald M. Swanson	1,988	
Progressives	Mary A. M. Hislop	1,463	
Liberal	Raymond T. Barker	689	
Majority		525	
Labour hold			

Location of Holyrood ward

Holyrood
Party	Candidate	Votes	%
Labour	Patrick Rogan	1,307	
Conservative	Anthony H. Lester	702	
Liberal	Robert E. Bell	540	
Majority		605	
Labour hold			

Location of Liberton ward

Liberton (2 seats)
Party	Candidate	Votes	%
Conservative	David M. Burnside	3,801	
Labour	Peter Wilson	3,047	
SNP	William T. Telford	2,726	
Labour	Eva Gibbons	2,402	
Turnout			
Conservative gain from Labour			
Labour hold			

Location of Merchiston ward

Merchiston
Party	Candidate	Votes	%
Progressives	Mauricde Heggie	2,920	
Liberal	Joyce Shein	2,325	
Majority		595	
Progressives hold			

Location of Morningside ward

Morningside
Party	Candidate	Votes	%
Progressives	Nansi H. Mansbridge	4,017	
SNP	Ian A. Macdonald	832	
Liberal	Thomas Glen	510	
Labour	John C. Campbell	396	
Majority		3,185	
Progressives hold			

Location of Murrayfield-Cramond ward

Murrayfield-Cramond
Party	Candidate	Votes	%
Progressives	Robert M. Knox	5,712	
Labour	Thomas H. Greig	1,705	
Majority		4,007	
Progressives hold			

Location of Newington ward

Newington
Party	Candidate	Votes	%
Progressives	G. Hedderwick	4,498	
Liberal	J. Grahamslaw	1,283	
Labour	D. E. S. Truman	1,175	
Majority		3,215	
Progressives hold			

Location of Pilton ward

Pilton
Party	Candidate	Votes	%
Labour	Magnus J. Williamson	1,975	
SNP	William Thomason	1,509	
Communist	Charles McManus	358	
Majority		466	
Labour hold			

Location of Portobello ward

Portobello
Party	Candidate	Votes	%
Progressives	Archibald D. Jameson	3,380	
SNP	Adam A. D. Hare	1,494	
Labour	Ronald D. M. Brown	997	
Majority		1,886	
Progressives hold			

Location of Sighthill ward

Sighthill
Party	Candidate	Votes	%
Labour	Isobella O. M. Stewart	Unopposed	
Labour hold			

Location of South Leith

South Leith
Party	Candidate	Votes	%
Progressives	Thomas S. Ramage	2,430	
Labour	Anne K. R. Simpson	2,234	
SNP	Douglas S. Walker	1,181	
Majority		196	
Progressives gain from Labour			

Location of St Andrews ward

St. Andrews (2 seats)
Party	Candidate	Votes	%
Conservative	Ronald R. Duff	2,144	
Progressives	Craig H. Richards	1,067	
Progressives	Roger O. S. Miller	850	
SNP	Francis C. Yeoman	781	
Labour	Gavid Kennedy	599	
Labour	Ernest Arden	552	
Conservative gain from Progressives			
Progressives hold			

Location of St Bernards ward

St. Bernards
Party	Candidate	Votes	%
Progressives	John Millar	3,105	
Liberal	William Murray	2,098	
Labour	Christopher Harvie	1,256	
Majority		1,007	
Progressives hold			

Location of St Giles ward

St. Giles
Party	Candidate	Votes	%
Labour	Charles R. Stuart	1,166	
Conservative	George T. Edwards	941	
Majority		225	
Labour hold			

Location of West Leith ward

West Leith
Party	Candidate	Votes	%
Progressives	Margaret B. A. Ross	4,030	
Labour	Ian M. Christie	1,232	
Majority		2,798	
Progressives hold			
