= 1967 Zetland County Council election =

1967 Scottish local government election

← 1964	May 9, 1967	1970 →

24 of 33 seats on the Zetland County Council 17 seats needed for a majority
	First party
Party	Independent
Seats won	24
Seat change	-
Popular vote	0
Percentage	-
Swing	-
Elected Council Convener
TBD

Elections to the Zetland County Council were held on 9 May 1967 as part of the 1967 Scottish local elections. Elections were held in every ward except for those in Lerwick to elect 24 landward members to the county council, who would be joined by nine nominated members from the Lerwick Town Council. None of the landward seats were contested.

== Election results ==
Zetland County Council Election Results
Party	Seats	Gains	Losses	Net gain/loss	Seats %	Votes %	Votes	+/−
Independent	24	0	0	-	-	-	0	-

== Ward results ==
Aithsting
Party	Candidate	Votes	%
Independent	Robert Garrick (Incumbent)	unopposed	unopposed
Majority		unopposed	unopposed
Independent hold			

Bressay
Party	Candidate	Votes	%
Independent	John Scott (Incumbent)	unopposed	unopposed
Majority		unopposed	unopposed
Independent hold			

Burra
Party	Candidate	Votes	%
Independent	George Nelson	unopposed	unopposed
Majority		unopposed	unopposed
Independent win (new seat)			

Cunningsburgh
Party	Candidate	Votes	%
Independent	Joan McLeod (Incumbent)	unopposed	unopposed
Majority		unopposed	unopposed
Independent hold			

Delting North
Party	Candidate	Votes	%
Independent	Andrew Tulloch (Incumbent)	unopposed	unopposed
Majority		unopposed	unopposed
Independent hold			

Delting South
Party	Candidate	Votes	%
Independent	Hugh Sutherland	unopposed	unopposed
Majority		unopposed	unopposed
Independent hold			

Dunrossness North
Party	Candidate	Votes	%
Independent	Iain Campbell	unopposed	unopposed
Majority		unopposed	unopposed
Independent hold			

Dunrossness South
Party	Candidate	Votes	%
Independent	Raymond Bentley (Incumbent)	unopposed	unopposed
Majority		unopposed	unopposed
Independent hold			

Fetlar
Party	Candidate	Votes	%
	No nominations		

Gulberwick & Quarff
Party	Candidate	Votes	%
Independent	Robert Johnson	unopposed	unopposed
Majority		unopposed	unopposed
Independent win (new seat)			

Nesting and Lunnasting
Party	Candidate	Votes	%
Independent	William Hamilton (Incumbent)	unopposed	unopposed
Majority		unopposed	unopposed
Independent hold			

Northmavine North
Party	Candidate	Votes	%
Independent	Andrew Cromarty (Incumbent)	unopposed	unopposed
Majority		unopposed	unopposed
Independent hold			

Northmavine South
Party	Candidate	Votes	%
Independent	Robert Balfour (Incumbent)	unopposed	unopposed
Majority		unopposed	unopposed
Independent hold			

Sandness
Party	Candidate	Votes	%
Independent	Robert Ganson (Incumbent)	unopposed	unopposed
Majority		unopposed	unopposed
Independent hold			

Sandsting
Party	Candidate	Votes	%
Independent	Alexander Tulloch (Incumbent)	unopposed	unopposed
Majority		unopposed	unopposed
Independent hold			

Sandwick
Party	Candidate	Votes	%
Independent	James Halcrow (Incumbent)	unopposed	unopposed
Majority		unopposed	unopposed
Independent hold			

Tingwall
Party	Candidate	Votes	%
	No nominations		

Unst North
Party	Candidate	Votes	%
Independent	Edward Thomason (Incumbent)	unopposed	unopposed
Majority		unopposed	unopposed
Independent hold			

Unst South
Party	Candidate	Votes	%
Independent	Peter Hunter (Incumbent)	unopposed	unopposed
Majority		unopposed	unopposed
Independent hold			

Walls
Party	Candidate	Votes	%
Independent	Harry Drever (Incumbent)	unopposed	unopposed
Majority		unopposed	unopposed
Independent hold			

Whalsay & Skerries
Party	Candidate	Votes	%
Independent	James Pottinger (Incumbent)	unopposed	unopposed
Majority		unopposed	unopposed
Independent hold			

Whiteness & Weisdale
Party	Candidate	Votes	%
Independent	Anthony Anderson (Incumbent)	unopposed	unopposed
Majority		unopposed	unopposed
Independent hold			

Yell North
Party	Candidate	Votes	%
Independent	Hugh Williamson	unopposed	unopposed
Majority		unopposed	unopposed
Independent hold			

Yell South
Party	Candidate	Votes	%
Independent	Robert Gray (Incumbent)	unopposed	unopposed
Majority		unopposed	unopposed
Independent hold			

== By-elections since 1967 ==
1967 Fetlar by-election
Party	Candidate	Votes	%
Independent	Arthur Johnson	unopposed	unopposed
Majority		unopposed	unopposed
Independent hold			

1967 Tingwall by-election
Party	Candidate	Votes	%
Independent	Andrew Irvine	unopposed	unopposed
Majority		unopposed	unopposed
Independent hold			
