= Scottish National Congress =

The Scottish National Congress was a small Scottish nationalist campaign group, focussed on direct action.

The group was founded in 1950 by Roland Muirhead and supporters including Oliver Brown, who became its first president. Other leading members included Robert B. Wilkie, Archie Lamont, David Murray, Kenneth McLaren and Matthew Somerville.

Although Muirhead was already 82, he was prominent in the Scottish nationalist movement as President of the Scottish National Party, remaining a party member while creating his own opposing organisation. The new group launched its own journal, Forward Scotland, and adopted a socialist perspective, with loose links to the Independent Labour Party, calling for direct action rather than standing in elections. However, Brown resigned in 1954, disapproving of its submission to the Royal Commission on Scottish Affairs, and it increasingly came to focus on the question of a Scottish constitution. Other activities included a campaign advocating the purchase of Scottish products.

In 1962, the Congress launched the Scottish Provisional Constituent Assembly, which published a proposed constitution in 1964, shortly before Muirhead's death. The group dissolved shortly after.
