= 1967 Salford City Council election =

Local election in Salford

- 11 May 1967

17 of 64 seats on Salford City Council 33 seats needed for a majority
	First party	Second party	Third party
Party	Labour	Conservative	Liberal
Last election	10 seats, 48.4%	5 seats, 45.4%	1 seat, 5.4%
Seats before	47	14	3
Seats won	3	13	1
Seats after	38	22	4
Seat change	▼9	▲8	▲1
Popular vote	11,979	19,524	2,866
Percentage	34.5%	56.3%	8.3%
Swing	▼13.9%	▲10.9%	▲2.9%
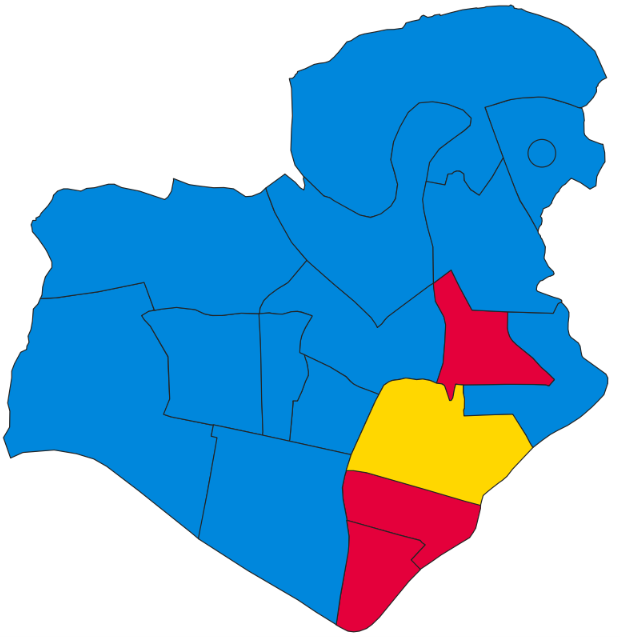
- Map of results of 1967 election
Leader of the Council before election
Labour
Leader of the Council after election
Labour

Elections to Salford City Council were held on Thursday, 11 May 1967. One-third of the councillors seats were up for election, with each successful candidate to serve a three-year term of office. The Labour Party retained overall control of the council.

== Election result ==
Party	Votes		Seats			Full Council	
Labour Party	11,979 (34.5%)	▼13.9	3 (17.6%)	3 / 17	▼9	38 (59.4%)	38 / 64
Conservative Party	19,524 (56.3%)	▲10.9	13 (76.5%)	13 / 17	▲8	22 (34.4%)	22 / 64
Liberal Party	2,866 (8.3%)	▲2.9	1 (5.9%)	1 / 17	▲1	4 (6.3%)	4 / 64
Communist	293 (0.8%)	▼0.1	0 (0.0%)	0 / 17	Steady	0 (0.0%)	0 / 64

=== Full council ===
↓
38	4	22

=== Aldermen ===
↓
16

=== Councillors ===
↓
22	4	22

== Ward results ==
=== Albert Park ===
Albert Park
Party	Candidate	Votes	%	±%
Conservative	M. Kemp	1,511	59.3	+24.4
Labour	S. O. Crawshaw	1,037	40.7	−24.4
Majority		474	18.6	
Turnout		2,548		
Conservative gain from Labour		Swing		

=== Charlestown ===
Charlestown
Party	Candidate	Votes	%	±%
Conservative	G. B. Swinburn	1,076	54.7	+19.8
Labour	J. Holt	890	45.3	−19.8
Majority		186	9.4	
Turnout		1,966		
Conservative gain from Labour		Swing		

=== Claremont ===
Claremont
Party	Candidate	Votes	%	±%
Conservative	A. E. Clark*	2,830	81.2	+12.6
Labour	B. L. Grimshaw	654	18.8	−12.6
Majority		2,176	62.4	+25.2
Turnout		3,484		
Conservative hold		Swing		

=== Crescent ===
Crescent
Party	Candidate	Votes	%	±%
Liberal	P. J. Fenlon	390	51.1	+15.3
Conservative	J. M. Cole	193	25.3	+4.8
Labour	R. Wiggins*	180	23.6	−20.1
Majority		197	25.8	
Turnout		763		
Liberal gain from Labour		Swing		

=== Docks ===
Docks
Party	Candidate	Votes	%	±%
Conservative	W. Eddes	1,276	62.5	+17.5
Labour	M. Stewart*	706	34.6	−15.6
Communist	T. A. Bentley	61	2.9	−1.9
Majority		570	27.9	
Turnout		2,043		
Conservative gain from Labour		Swing		

=== Kersal ===
Kersal
Party	Candidate	Votes	%	±%
Conservative	C. S. Franks*	1,990	56.1	+24.9
Liberal	J. E. Littman	934	26.3	−13.7
Labour	L. M. Turner	623	17.6	−11.2
Majority		1,056	29.8	
Turnout		3,547		
Conservative hold		Swing		

=== Langworthy ===
Langworthy
Party	Candidate	Votes	%	±%
Conservative	F. Brooks	994	47.6	+6.2
Labour	W. Heathcote	757	36.2	−22.4
Liberal	W. Timms	338	16.2	N/A
Majority		237	11.4	
Turnout		2,089		
Conservative gain from Labour		Swing		

=== Mandley Park ===
Mandley Park (2 vacancies)
Party	Candidate	Votes	%	±%
Conservative	V. E. Smith	1,160	47.7	+7.5
Conservative	G. F. Pollard	1,134	46.5	+6.3
Labour	T. Cunningham	943	38.7	−21.1
Labour	N. Wright	936	38.4	−21.4
Liberal	S. Craimer	364	14.9	N/A
Liberal	J. J. Messenger	338	13.9	N/A
Majority		191	7.8	
Turnout		2,438		
Conservative hold		Swing		
Conservative gain from Labour		Swing		

=== Ordsall Park ===
Ordsall Park
Party	Candidate	Votes	%	±%
Labour	W. Neafsey*	799	51.3	−36.5
Conservative	P. Pessagno	672	43.2	N/A
Communist	A. Moore	85	5.5	−6.7
Majority		127	8.1	−67.5
Turnout		1,556		
Labour hold		Swing		

=== Regent ===
Regent
Party	Candidate	Votes	%	±%
Labour	J. Mackenzie*	732	42.5	−20.5
Conservative	J. Bradbury	617	35.9	+5.8
Liberal	W. W. Buckley	244	14.2	N/A
Communist	W. Fallon	128	7.4	+0.5
Majority		115	6.6	−26.3
Turnout		1,721		
Labour hold		Swing		

=== St. Matthias' ===
St. Matthias'
Party	Candidate	Votes	%	±%
Labour	J. J. Ferris*	807	55.5	−17.1
Conservative	G. Bamber	647	44.5	+17.1
Majority		160	11.0	−34.2
Turnout		1,454		
Labour hold		Swing		

=== St. Paul's ===
St. Paul's
Party	Candidate	Votes	%	±%
Conservative	J. Wood	656	42.6	+1.5
Labour	P. Grimshaw*	627	40.7	−18.2
Liberal	P. Smith	258	16.7	N/A
Majority		29	1.9	
Turnout		1,541		
Conservative gain from Labour		Swing		

=== St. Thomas' ===
St. Thomas'
Party	Candidate	Votes	%	±%
Conservative	E. Richmond	638	66.5	+11.1
Labour	W. Briggs	303	31.6	−13.0
Communist	J. Cohen	19	1.9	N/A
Majority		335	34.9	+24.1
Turnout		960		
Conservative gain from Labour		Swing		

=== Seedley ===
Seedley
Party	Candidate	Votes	%	±%
Conservative	H. Mellor*	1,768	69.3	−2.2
Labour	A. C. Casson	783	30.7	+2.2
Majority		985	38.6	−4.4
Turnout		2,551		
Conservative hold		Swing		

=== Trinity ===
Trinity
Party	Candidate	Votes	%	±%
Conservative	J. H. Winder	532	58.8	+7.2
Labour	A. Adams*	373	41.2	−7.2
Majority		159	17.6	+14.4
Turnout		905		
Conservative gain from Labour		Swing		

=== Weaste ===
Weaste
Party	Candidate	Votes	%	±%
Conservative	A. Ashcroft*	1,830	68.8	+13.7
Labour	A. Richardson	829	31.2	−13.7
Majority		1,001	37.6	+27.4
Turnout		2,659		
Conservative hold		Swing		
