= 1972 Scottish local elections =

Local elections took place in Scotland on 2 May 1972.

The Labour Party built upon their success in the 1971 local elections, coming close to winning control of all four Scottish cities: they fell short in Edinburgh by two seats. One of their other gains was in Greenock, which had been the only council controlled by the Liberal Party.

The Scottish National Party suffered a disastrous result, losing their last remaining ward in Shettleston, Glasgow, for instance, although they increased their majority in their last remaining stronghold of Cumbernauld. Similarly, the Progressives lost all three of the seats they were defending in Glasgow.
