= 1967 Glamorgan County Council election =

1967 Welsh local government election

The 1967 Glamorgan County Council election was held on Thursday 13 April 1967 in the county of Glamorgan, Wales, to elect members to Glamorgan County Council. The previous full council elections were in 1964 and the final elections to the council would come in 1970.

== Overview of the result ==
The Labour Party lost nine seats at this election but retained a strong majority with 50 councillors, as well as the support of 22 Labour aldermen. Plaid Cymru representation returned to the council after their candidates beat Labour in two seats, with the victorious candidate in Ferndale being afterwards carried down the road by supporters. The Liberal Party won two seats, their first on the council. One seat was won by Ratepayers, also their first on the council. The Conservative Party won two seats, as did the Communist Party. In Hengoed, the previously sitting Labour councillor, who had been expelled from the party prior to the election, was returned as an Independent Labour councillor.

Both the Labour and Conservative spokespersons described the swing against Labour as being a result of national issues, with the UK Labour government at that time becoming less popular.

== Ward results ==
Contests took place in thirty electoral wards:

=== Aberaman ===
Aberaman 1967
Party	Candidate	Votes	%	±%
Labour	Fred Riddiford *	989		
Communist	D.P. Bletchley	366		
Labour hold		Swing		

=== Aberavon ===
Aberavon 1967
Party	Candidate	Votes	%	±%
Ratepayer	William Arthur Jenkins	1,667		
Labour	Joseph Treharne *	1,633		
Ratepayer gain from Labour		Swing		

=== Blaengwawr ===
Blaengwawr 1967
Party	Candidate	Votes	%	±%
Communist	Trevor Williams *	979		
Labour	Michael Goldberg	773		
Communist hold		Swing		

=== Bridgend ===
Bridgend 1967
Party	Candidate	Votes	%	±%
Labour	Alfred John Bowen *	1,715		
Conservative	John Nigel Baty	1,698		
Labour hold		Swing		

=== Caerphilly ===
Caerphilly 1967
Party	Candidate	Votes	%	±%
Labour	Bertie Alex Rowland *	2,728		
Independent	Herbert Protheroe	2,484		
Labour hold		Swing		

=== Castell Coch ===
Castell Coch 1967
Party	Candidate	Votes	%	±%
Independent	Nelson Stuart East	2,000		
Labour	Gerald Bailey	1,286		
Independent hold		Swing		

=== Cilfynydd ===
Cilfynydd 1967
Party	Candidate	Votes	%	±%
Labour	William Edryd Lewis *	1,821		
Liberal	Mary Gwyneth Murphy	1,544		
Labour hold		Swing		

=== Coedffranc ===
Coedffranc 1967
Party	Candidate	Votes	%	±%
Independent	Martin Thomas	3,381		
Labour	Thomas Lewis Thomas	2,046		
Independent hold		Swing		

=== Coity ===
Coity 1967
Party	Candidate	Votes	%	±%
Independent Householders	William Vernon Barnett	1,367		
Labour	Harry Davis	1,314		
Independent gain from Labour		Swing		

=== Cowbridge ===
Cowbridge 1967
Party	Candidate	Votes	%	±%
Independent	Joseph A. David	2,728		
Labour	Terence Williams	2,138		
Independent hold		Swing		

=== Cwmavon ===
Cwmavon 1967
Party	Candidate	Votes	%	±%
Labour	Edward Gwynfryn Davies *	2,290		
Ratepayer	William Edward Ebley	1,697		
Labour hold		Swing		

=== Ferndale ===
Ferndale 1967
Party	Candidate	Votes	%	±%
Plaid Cymru	Glyn Powell James	2,325		
Labour	Dan Walter Jeffreys *	1,694		
Plaid Cymru gain from Labour		Swing		

Councillor James had lost the seat to Labour at the 1964 elections. Following his victory he was carried down the street outside the North Road School polling station by "excited" supporters.

=== Gadlys ===
Gadlys 1967
Party	Candidate	Votes	%	±%
Labour	Rhys James *	903		
Plaid Cymru	John Eaton Williams	856		
Labour hold		Swing		

=== Garw Valley ===
Garw Valley 1967
Party	Candidate	Votes	%	±%
Labour	Rhys Edward Sant *	2,118		
Ratepayer	Derek Dillwyn Stephens	1,743		
Labour hold		Swing		

=== Gower ===
Gower 1967
Party	Candidate	Votes	%	±%
Liberal	Brian Ernest Keal	2,399		
Labour	Frank Lord *	2,102		
Liberal gain from Labour		Swing		

Councillor Keal became the first Liberal councillor in the area since World War II.

=== Hengoed ===
Hengoed 1967
Party	Candidate	Votes	%	±%
Independent Labour	David Samuel Blatchford *	2,925		
Labour	Hopkin Lewis	1,692		
Independent Labour gain from Labour		Swing		

Councillor Blatchford had represented the seat for 7 years for the Labour Party, but was expelled for opposing the official candidate, so stood and won as an Independent.

=== Hopkinstown ===
Hopkinstown 1967
Party	Candidate	Votes	%	±%
Labour	George Davies *	1,350		
Plaid Cymru	Brian John	708		
Labour hold		Swing		

=== Laleston ===
Laleston 1967
Party	Candidate	Votes	%	±%
Conservative	William Evan Board	882		
Labour	Glyndwr Evans	809		
Independent	Trevor David	539		
Conservative gain from Labour		Swing		

=== Llwydcoed ===
Llwydcoed 1967
Party	Candidate	Votes	%	±%
Labour	Mervyn Prowle *	1,243		
Communist	Stanley Rees	336		
Labour hold		Swing		

=== Maesteg ===
Maesteg 1967
Party	Candidate	Votes	%	±%
Liberal	(Mrs) Jennie Thomas Gibbs	2,472		
Labour	Robert John Williams	2,247		
Liberal gain from Labour		Swing		

Gibbs had missed winning the seat, by only 3 votes, in the 1964 election.

=== Mountain Ash (Penrhiwceiber ward) ===
Mountain Ash (Penrhiwceiber ward) 1967
Party	Candidate	Votes	%	±%
Labour	Eleanor Mary Bath	2,005		
Independent	Graham F. Davies *	1,188		
Labour gain from Independent		Swing		

=== Neath North ===
Neath North 1967
Party	Candidate	Votes	%	±%
Independent	John Leitz	1,561		
Labour	William Powell *	1,432		
Independent gain from Labour		Swing		

=== Ogmore Valley ===
Ogmore Valley 1967
Party	Candidate	Votes	%	±%
Plaid Cymru	Edward John Merriman	1,906		
Labour	Ivor Owen Thomas *	1,870		
Plaid Cymru gain from Labour		Swing		

=== Pontypridd ===
Pontypridd 1967
Party	Candidate	Votes	%	±%
Labour	Norman Alfred Stevens *	1,515		
Liberal	Derek Gwyn Lewis	1,125		
Labour hold		Swing		

=== Porthcawl ===
Porthcawl 1967
Party	Candidate	Votes	%	±%
Conservative	Peter Charles Hubbard-Miles	1,701		
Labour	George McBride	1,289		
Independent	Llewellyn Rees Lewis	671		
Conservative gain from Independent		Swing		

=== Port Talbot East ===
Port Talbot East 1967
Party	Candidate	Votes	%	±%
Labour	Llewellyn Heycock	2,906		
Ratepayer	John Allen	1,667		
Labour hold		Swing		

=== Port Talbot West ===
Port Talbot West 1967
Party	Candidate	Votes	%	±%
Labour	George Albert Morgan *	1,623		
Ratepayer	Douglas Albert Weaver Charles	1,309		
Labour hold		Swing		

=== Pyle ===
Pyle 1967
Party	Candidate	Votes	%	±%
Labour	Mostyn Jones *	2,158		
Independent	Christopher Johnson	1,803		
Labour hold		Swing		

=== Sandfields (Port Talbot) ===
Sandfields (Port Talbot) 1967
Party	Candidate	Votes	%	±%
Labour	Cyril Lewis *	2,458		
Ratepayer	Barrie Morgan Larkworthy	1,535		
Labour hold		Swing		

=== Ystrad (Rhondda) ===
Ystrad (Rhondda) 1967
Party	Candidate	Votes	%	±%
Labour	David John Davies *	1,122		
Communist	George Baker	828		
Labour hold		Swing		
