= 1971 Scottish local elections =

Local elections were held in Scotland on 4 May 1971.

As in other parts of the United Kingdom, they were a great success for the opposition Labour Party which gained control of Glasgow and Dundee, as well as becoming the largest party in Edinburgh for the first time. Overall they gained 113 seats, the majority of them from the Conservatives and their allies. The Conservatives lost 10 seats in Glasgow, including within Cathcart where their organization was at its best.

The result was a very poor one for the Scottish National Party which lost the seats they were defending in Glasgow, Edinburgh, Aberdeen and Dundee. They lost a total of 52 seats, though they retained control of Cumbernauld and did better than average in both Stirling and Falkirk.
