= 1967 Essex County Council election =

1967 UK local government election

← 1965	15 April 1967	1970 →

All 77 seats to Essex County Council 39 seats needed for a majority

	First party	Second party	Third party
Party	Conservative	Labour	Liberal
Last election	47 seats, 52.3%	29 seats, 41.4%	1 seat, 5.1%
Seats won	64	13	0
Seat change	▲17	▼16	▼1
Popular vote	146,173	74,748	8,768
Percentage	63.2%	32.3%	3.8%
Swing	▲10.9%	▼9.1%	▼1.5%
Council control before election
Conservative
Council control after election
Conservative

The 1967 Essex County Council election took place on 15 April 1967 to elect members of Essex County Council in England.

== Summary ==
1967 Essex County Council election
Party	Seats	Gains	Losses	Net gain/loss	Seats %	Votes %	Votes	+/−
Conservative	64	17	0	▲17	83.1	63.2	146,173	+10.9
Labour	13	0	16	▼16	16.9	32.3	74,748	–9.1
Liberal	0	0	1	▼1	0.0	3.8	8,768	–1.5
Independent	0	0	0	0	0.0	0.6	1,447	–0.6
