= Kenneth Borthwick =

Scottish businessman and politician

Kenneth Borthwick CBE DL JP (4 November 1915 – 30 August 2017) was a 20th-century Scottish businessman and Conservative Party politician who served as Lord Provost of Edinburgh from 1977 to 1980 and as Chairman of the 1986 Commonwealth Games.

== Life ==
He was born in Leith in the final months of 1915. He was educated at Hermitage Primary School south of Leith Links, then, due to his father's death, won a place at George Heriot's School as a foundationer. He joined the Aberdeen police force in 1935 and served there for 12 years, also serving in the Second World War as a navigator in the RAF.

In 1947 he emigrated to South Africa with his young family, setting up business as a confectioner, but returned to Scotland in 1956, to avoid his children being educated in the apartheid system. He then became interested in local politics, representing Portobello on Edinburgh Corporation, Lothian Regional Council and Edinburgh District Council, first as a Progressive and then, after 1974, as a Conservative. During this period he did much to promote sport in the city, helping to create both the Commonwealth Pool and Hillend Ski Centre.

In 1977 Borthwick was elected Lord Provost of the city. He retired from Edinburgh District Council in 1980, then taking on the role of Honorary Consul of Malawi. He was also Dean of the Edinburgh and Leith Consular Corps. In 1986 he was appointed Chairman of the Commonwealth Games. However this Games was heavily affected by boycotts due to Britain's alleged collusion with South Africa's apartheid scheme.

He died peacefully at Edinburgh Royal Infirmary on 30 August 2017 aged 101. He was Edinburgh's longest-lived Lord Provost.

== Family ==
In 1942 he married Irene (d.2009). They had three children, Gilroy, Jean and Andrew. Their son Gilroy (Gil) Borthwick (1946–1999) was a talented rugby player.
