= 1969 Scottish local elections =

Local elections were held in Scotland in May 1969. The turnout was one of the lowest on record, due to heavy rain and television coverage of the Scotland-Northern Ireland International football match at Hampden Park, Glasgow.

The Scottish National Party failed to repeat their success in the 1968 local elections. Their hopes of becoming the second largest party in Edinburgh were dashed when they could only notch up a solitary win in Sighthill ward.

Labour lost ground overall, losing in Glasgow where the Conservatives and Progressives gained control for the first time in many years. Labour did however regain control of Aberdeen, which they had lost in 1968. They also regained Kilsyth and swept all six seats in Lochgelly, Fife.

The Progressives retained Dundee by the Lord Provost's casting vote.
