= Jack Kane (Lord Provost) =

- Born: 1 April 1911
- Died: 10 October 1999 (aged 88); Edinburgh, Scotland
- Years active: 1938 -1976
- Known for: Scottish Labour politician and Lord Provost of Edinburgh 1972-1975
- Political party: Labour Party

Jack Kane (1 April 1911 – 10 October 1999) was a Scottish politician and social campaigner who served as Lord Provost of Edinburgh from 1972 to 1975. He was Edinburgh's first Labour Lord Provost.

== Early life ==
He was born on 1 April 1911 in Addiewell in West Lothian, the youngest of three brothers in a coal-mining family. The family moved to Stoneyburn, and he was educated at Bathgate Academy.

The family then moved to Niddrie Mains in south Edinburgh. From 1936 he worked as a librarian.In the Second World War Kane served in the Royal Artillery.

== Political career ==
In 1938 Kane was elected as a Labour town councillor, representing Liberton. After the war he represented Craigmillar.

In 1962 he helped the parents of Peffermill Primary School found the Craigmillar Festival Society. In 1969 he received an OBE for his services to the local community.

In May 1972 he was elected the first Labour Lord Provost of Edinburgh, succeeding Sir James Wilson McKay. He remained Lord Provost until 1975 when the implementation of the Local Government (Scotland) Act 1973 subsumed Edinburgh into the Lothian Region. While Lord Provost he served as chairman of the Edinburgh Festival Society

In 1974 owing to his political beliefs he declined a knighthood in the New Year's Honours List, the first Lord Provost to so decline. As a result of him declining the knighthood, the Crown no longer offers an automatic knighthood to the Lord Provost of Edinburgh as it previously did.

From 1975 he served as a councillor for Lothian Regional Council representing Niddrie/Craigmillar. In 1975 Kane was appointed Chairman of the Board of Trustees of the National Galleries of Scotland by the Labour Government led by Harold Wilson. He retired on 30 March 1976.He accepted an honorary doctorate (LLD) from the University of Edinburgh in 1976.

In 1983 he became Chairman of Age Concern in Scotland.

== Recognition ==
The Jack Kane Sports Centre in Craigmillar is named in his memory. His portrait by Alexander Goudie is held by City of Edinburgh Council.

== Family ==
Kane was married to Anne. They had three children: Carol (a dancer and graphic designer ,1945-2025); Denis (1948-2007) and Maureen (known as Mo, a picture editor and community activist, 1954-2024); and one grandson, Jonathan (known as J.Saul Kane, a musician and DJ, 1967-2024).

== Death ==
He died on 10 October 1999, and was cremated at Warriston Crematorium,
