= Progressive Party (Scotland) =

Anti-Labour party municipal political organisation

- Founded: Early 20th century
- Dissolved: Late 1970s
- Ideology: Anti-Labour co-operation Localism; Economic liberalism

The Progressive Party was a municipal political organisation that operated in several Scottish cities and towns in the 20th century. It was based on tacit anti-Labour co-operation between the Unionist Party, Scottish Liberals and independents.

== Origins ==
National political parties were rarely active in local politics but the rise of the Labour Party led to a process of party politicisation of local government. However, at first Labour were opposed by the Progressives before other national political parties entered local government elections on a significant scale.

The Progressives formed as a loose alliance of unofficial Liberals, Unionists and independents. Apart from a distinct focus on their urban localities the other essence of the Progressive groupings was opposition to Labour policies and control, plus a desire to avoid splitting the anti-Labour vote.

== History ==
Progressive groupings formed in Edinburgh Corporation in 1928 and Glasgow Corporation in 1936 before spreading to other cities and towns. Their members were mainly drawn from local middle-class businessmen opposed to the introduction of what they saw as municipal socialism and Labour control. They dominated Scottish local politics for almost 50 years and as late as 1972 Edinburgh Corporation was made up of 21 Progressives, nine Conservatives, 33 Labour and five Liberals.

However, by the end of the 1970s they had completely disappeared as the entry of Scottish National Party, Liberal and Conservative candidates into local politics supplanted their role of opposing Labour.
