= 1971 Stretford Municipal Borough Council election =

UK local government election

← 1970	13 May 1971	1972 →

8 of 32 seats to Stretford Municipal Borough Council 16 seats needed for a majority
	First party	Second party
Party	Conservative	Labour
Last election	4 seats, 49.5%	4 seats, 46.5%
Seats before	23	9
Seats won	2	6
Seats after	18	14
Seat change	▼5	▲5
Popular vote	6,788	10,548
Percentage	39.1%	60.7%
Swing	▼10.4%	▲14.2%
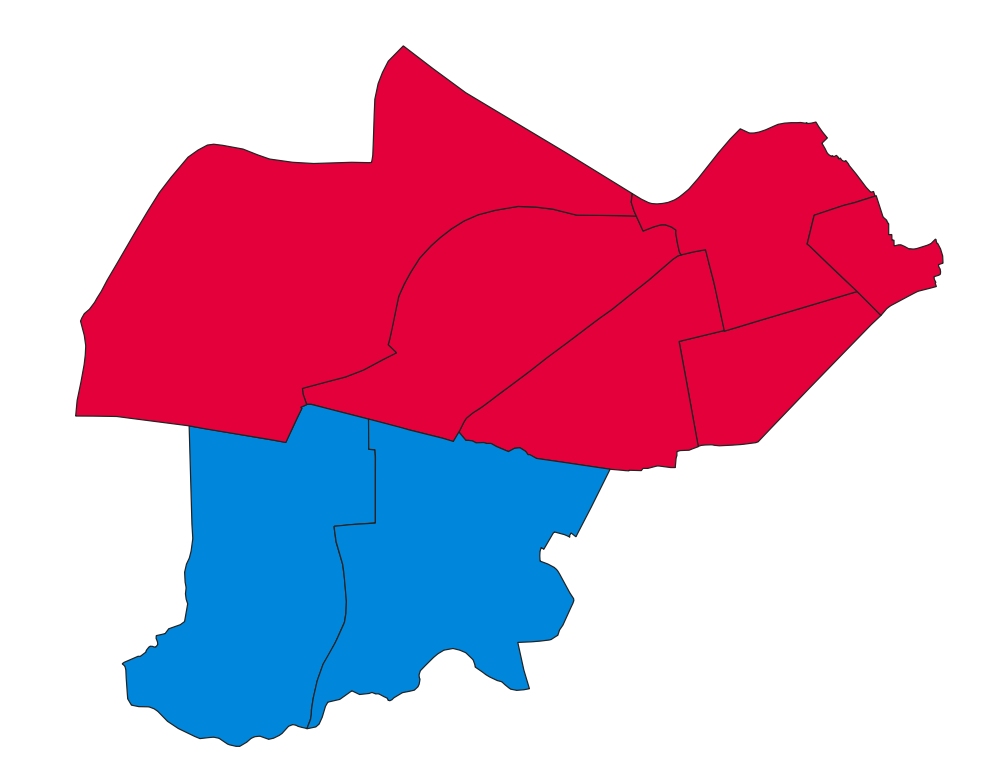
- Map of results of 1971 election
Leader of the Council before election
Conservative
Leader of the Council after election
Conservative

Elections to Stretford Council were held on Thursday, 13 May 1971. One third of the councillors were up for election, with each successful candidate to serve a three-year term of office. The Conservative Party retained overall control of the council.

== Election result ==
Party	Votes		Seats			Full Council	
Conservative Party	6,788 (39.1%)	▼10.4	2 (25.0%)	2 / 8	▼5	18 (56.3%)	18 / 32
Labour Party	10,548 (60.7%)	▲14.2	6 (75.0%)	6 / 8	▲5	14 (43.7%)	14 / 32
Communist Party	40 (0.2%)	▼0.1	0 (0.0%)	0 / 8	Steady	0 (0.0%)	0 / 32

=== Full council ===
↓
14	18

=== Aldermen ===
↓
4	4

=== Councillors ===
↓
10	14

== Ward results ==
=== Clifford ===
Clifford
Party	Candidate	Votes	%	±%
Labour	J. Shaw*	1,070	73.3	+18.6
Conservative	D. H. Shawcross	389	26.7	−18.6
Majority		681	46.6	+37.2
Turnout		1,459		
Labour hold		Swing		

=== Cornbrook ===
Cornbrook
Party	Candidate	Votes	%	±%
Labour	A. Bates	1,085	69.1	+13.8
Conservative	R. D. Doherty	486	30.9	−13.8
Majority		599	38.2	+27.6
Turnout		1,571		
Labour gain from Conservative		Swing		

=== Longford ===
Longford
Party	Candidate	Votes	%	±%
Conservative	B. E. Boulton*	1,090	50.8	−11.4
Labour	J. Bailey	1,055	49.2	+11.4
Majority		35	1.6	−22.8
Turnout		2,145		
Conservative hold		Swing		

=== Park ===
Park
Party	Candidate	Votes	%	±%
Labour	C. Dewhurst	1,837	68.2	+9.7
Conservative	M. A. M. Evans*	817	30.3	−9.0
Communist	A. Jarratt	40	1.5	−0.7
Majority		1,020	37.9	+18.7
Turnout		2,694		
Labour gain from Conservative		Swing		

=== Stretford ===
Stretford
Party	Candidate	Votes	%	±%
Conservative	H. H. Jones*	1,310	53.5	+1.5
Labour	R. A. Tully	1,139	46.5	+21.6
Majority		171	7.0	−20.1
Turnout		2,449		
Conservative hold		Swing		

=== Talbot North ===
Talbot North
Party	Candidate	Votes	%	±%
Labour	G. Marland	2,040	72.5	+9.0
Conservative	I. M. Farrer	774	27.5	−9.0
Majority		1,266	45.0	+18.0
Turnout		2,814		
Labour gain from Conservative		Swing		

=== Talbot South ===
Talbot South
Party	Candidate	Votes	%	±%
Labour	K. Silcock	1,283	59.0	+13.8
Conservative	A. Kelly*	890	41.0	−13.8
Majority		393	18.0	
Turnout		2,173		
Labour gain from Conservative		Swing		

=== Trafford ===
Trafford
Party	Candidate	Votes	%	±%
Labour	I. R. Adshead	1,039	50.2	+14.6
Conservative	J. E. Schofield*	1,032	49.8	−14.6
Majority		7	0.4	
Turnout		2,071		
Labour gain from Conservative		Swing		
