= 1964 Stretford Municipal Borough Council election =

UK local government election

- 7 May 1964

8 of 32 seats to Stretford Municipal Borough Council 16 seats needed for a majority
	First party	Second party	Third party
Party	Labour	Conservative	Liberal
Last election	4 seats, 44.7%	4 seats, 34.7%	0 seats, 20.3%
Seats before	16	14	2
Seats won	5	3	0
Seats after	17	13	2
Seat change	▲1	▼1	Steady
Popular vote	7,385	5,772	2,430
Percentage	47.2%	36.9%	15.5%
Swing	▲2.5%	▲2.2%	▼4.8%
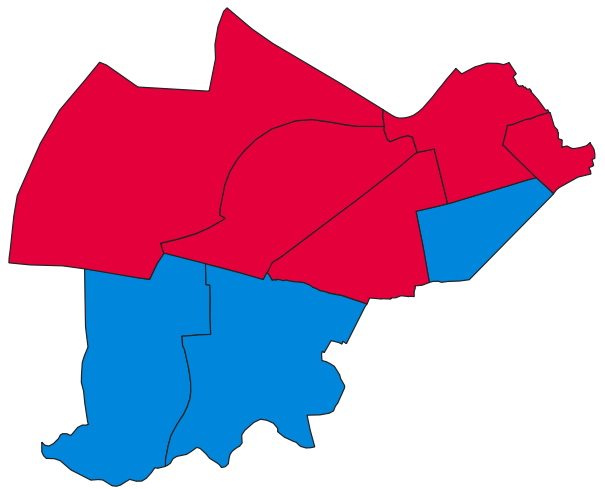
- Map of results of 1964 election
Leader of the Council before election
No overall control
Leader of the Council after election
Labour

Elections to Stretford Council were held on Thursday, 7 May 1964. One third of the councillors were up for election, with each successful candidate to serve a three-year term of office. The Labour Party gained overall control of the council from no overall control.

== Election result ==
Party	Votes		Seats			Full Council	
Labour Party	7,385 (47.2%)	▲2.5	5 (62.5%)	5 / 8	▲1	17 (53.1%)	17 / 32
Conservative Party	5,772 (36.9%)	▲2.2	3 (37.5%)	3 / 8	▼1	13 (40.6%)	13 / 32
Liberal Party	2,430 (15.5%)	▼4.8	0 (0.0%)	0 / 8	Steady	2 (6.3%)	2 / 32
Communist Party	67 (0.4%)	▲0.1	0 (0.0%)	0 / 8	Steady	0 (0.0%)	0 / 32

=== Full council ===
↓
17	2	13

=== Aldermen ===
↓
4	4

=== Councillors ===
↓
13	2	9

== Ward results ==
=== Clifford ===
Clifford
Party	Candidate	Votes	%	±%
Labour	E. Fawcett*	792	70.0	−1.2
Conservative	G. Swetman	340	30.0	+1.2
Majority		452	40.0	−2.4
Turnout		1,132		
Labour hold		Swing		

=== Cornbrook ===
Cornbrook
Party	Candidate	Votes	%	±%
Labour	E. Cavanagh*	685	54.4	0
Conservative	A. MacGregor	347	27.5	+7.1
Liberal	W. Hamer	228	18.1	−7.1
Majority		338	26.9	−2.3
Turnout		1,260		
Labour hold		Swing		

=== Longford ===
Longford
Party	Candidate	Votes	%	±%
Conservative	D. Homer*	1,280	59.9	+18.7
Labour	V. Cooling	857	40.1	+3.7
Majority		423	19.8	+15.0
Turnout		2,137		
Conservative hold		Swing		

=== Park ===
Park
Party	Candidate	Votes	%	±%
Labour	E. Davies*	1,347	64.1	+0.5
Conservative	H. Jones	686	32.7	−1.1
Communist	V. Eddisford	67	3.2	+0.6
Majority		661	31.4	+1.6
Turnout		2,100		
Labour hold		Swing		

=== Stretford ===
Stretford
Party	Candidate	Votes	%	±%
Conservative	T. Davies*	1,277	48.1	+6.5
Labour	M. Davies	834	31.4	+5.4
Liberal	S. Roberts	543	20.5	−11.9
Majority		443	16.7	+7.5
Turnout		2,654		
Conservative hold		Swing		

=== Talbot North ===
Talbot North
Party	Candidate	Votes	%	±%
Labour	H. Cronshaw*	1,422	68.1	+8.5
Liberal	W. Ellis	667	31.9	+13.0
Majority		755	36.2	−1.9
Turnout		2,089		
Labour hold		Swing		

=== Talbot South ===
Talbot South
Party	Candidate	Votes	%	±%
Labour	D. Stewart	980	46.1	+6.8
Conservative	B. Davison*	919	43.2	+2.0
Liberal	N. Norris	226	10.7	−8.8
Majority		61	2.9	
Turnout		2,125		
Labour gain from Conservative		Swing		

=== Trafford ===
Trafford
Party	Candidate	Votes	%	±%
Conservative	H. Eckersall*	923	42.8	+0.5
Liberal	J. Bainbridge	766	35.5	+1.2
Labour	I. Clough	468	21.7	−1.7
Majority		157	7.3	−0.7
Turnout		2,157		
Conservative hold		Swing		
