= 1961 Stretford Municipal Borough Council election =

UK local government election

- 11 May 1961

8 of 32 seats to Stretford Municipal Borough Council 16 seats needed for a majority
	First party	Second party
Party	Conservative	Labour
Last election	4 seats, 52.4%	4 seats, 40.7%
Seats before	18	13
Seats won	4	4
Seats after	18	14
Seat change	Steady	▲1
Popular vote	8,137	7,087
Percentage	48.2%	42.0%
Swing	▼4.2%	▲1.3%
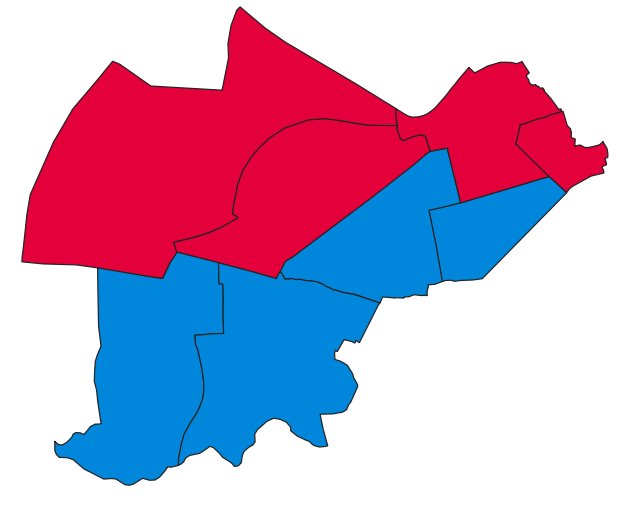
- Map of results of 1961 election
Leader of the Council before election
Conservative
Leader of the Council after election
Conservative

Elections to Stretford Council were held on Thursday, 11 May 1961. One third of the councillors were up for election, with each successful candidate to serve a three-year term of office. The Conservative Party retained overall control of the council.

== Election result ==
Party	Votes		Seats			Full Council	
Conservative Party	8,137 (48.2%)	▼4.2	4 (50.0%)	4 / 8	Steady	18 (56.3%)	18 / 32
Labour Party	7,087 (42.0%)	▲1.3	4 (50.0%)	4 / 8	▲1	14 (43.7%)	14 / 32
Liberal Party	1,264 (7.5%)	▲1.0	0 (0.0%)	0 / 8	Steady	0 (0.0%)	0 / 32
Independent Labour	355 (2.1%)	N/A	0 (0.0%)	0 / 8	▼1	0 (0.0%)	0 / 32
Communist Party	48 (0.3%)	Steady	0 (0.0%)	0 / 8	Steady	0 (0.0%)	0 / 32

=== Full council ===
↓
14	18

=== Aldermen ===
↓
2	6

=== Councillors ===
↓
12	12

== Ward results ==
=== Clifford ===
Clifford
Party	Candidate	Votes	%	±%
Labour	E. Fawcett*	801	61.2	+5.4
Conservative	F. Lawson	507	38.8	−5.4
Majority		294	22.4	+10.8
Turnout		1,308		
Labour hold		Swing		

=== Cornbrook ===
Cornbrook
Party	Candidate	Votes	%	±%
Labour	E. Cavanagh*	859	53.6	−1.9
Conservative	J. E. Schofield	744	46.4	+1.9
Majority		115	7.2	−3.8
Turnout		1,603		
Labour hold		Swing		

=== Longford ===
Longford
Party	Candidate	Votes	%	±%
Conservative	L. W. Hall*	1,265	50.8	−0.6
Labour	W. Malone	763	30.6	+1.5
Liberal	V. Dearden	463	18.6	−0.9
Majority		502	20.2	−2.1
Turnout		2,491		
Conservative hold		Swing		

=== Park ===
Park
Party	Candidate	Votes	%	±%
Labour	E. Davies	1,549	51.0	+1.7
Conservative	S. Till	1,083	35.7	−12.7
Independent Labour	F. P. Fay*	355	11.7	N/A
Communist	V. Eddisford	48	1.6	−0.7
Majority		466	15.3	+14.4
Turnout		3,035		
Labour gain from Independent Labour		Swing		

=== Stretford ===
Stretford
Party	Candidate	Votes	%	±%
Conservative	T. Davies*	1,201	47.0	−6.8
Liberal	J. C. Owen	801	31.3	+6.8
Labour	V. Cooling	554	21.7	0
Majority		400	15.7	−13.6
Turnout		2,556		
Conservative hold		Swing		

=== Talbot North ===
Talbot North
Party	Candidate	Votes	%	±%
Labour	H. C. Cronshaw	1,477	54.6	−2.1
Conservative	M. M. Hayden	1,229	45.4	+2.1
Majority		248	9.2	−4.2
Turnout		2,706		
Labour hold		Swing		

=== Talbot South ===
Talbot South
Party	Candidate	Votes	%	±%
Conservative	B. Davison*	1,055	59.0	−4.2
Labour	A. S. Clough	732	41.0	+4.2
Majority		323	18.0	−8.4
Turnout		1,787		
Conservative hold		Swing		

=== Trafford ===
Trafford
Party	Candidate	Votes	%	±%
Conservative	H. H. Eckersall*	1,053	74.9	−1.1
Labour	R. W. Flatters	352	25.1	+2.1
Majority		701	49.8	−4.2
Turnout		1,405		
Conservative hold		Swing		
