= 1955 Stretford Municipal Borough Council election =

UK local government election

- 12 May 1955

8 of 32 seats to Stretford Municipal Borough Council 16 seats needed for a majority
	First party	Second party
Party	Conservative	Labour
Seats before	20	12
Seats won	6	2
Seats after	22	10
Seat change	▲2	▼2
Popular vote	11,074	7,743
Percentage	58.9%	41.1%
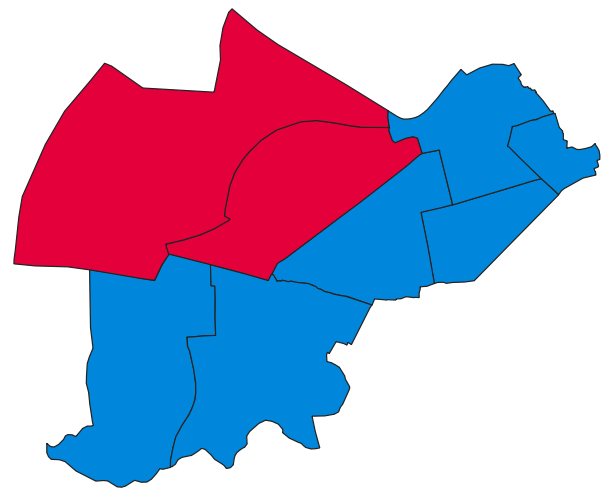
- Map of results of 1955 election
Leader of the Council before election
Conservative
Leader of the Council after election
Conservative

Elections to Stretford Council were held on Thursday, 12 May 1955. One third of the councillors were up for election, with each successful candidate to serve a three-year term of office. The Conservative Party retained overall control of the council.

== Election result ==
Party	Votes	Seats			Full Council	
Conservative Party	11,074 (58.9%)	6 (75.0%)	6 / 8	▲2	22 (68.7%)	22 / 32
Labour Party	7,743 (41.1%)	2 (25.0%)	2 / 8	▼2	10 (31.3%)	10 / 32

=== Full council ===
↓
10	22

=== Aldermen ===
↓
2	6

=== Councillors ===
↓
8	16

== Ward results ==
=== Clifford ===
Clifford
Party	Candidate	Votes	%	±%
Conservative	T. Butterworth	1,189	55.0	
Labour	E. Cavanagh*	971	45.0	
Majority		218	10.0	
Turnout		2,160		
Conservative gain from Labour		Swing		

=== Cornbrook ===
Cornbrook
Party	Candidate	Votes	%	±%
Conservative	G. Langton	867	50.8	
Labour	H. Pyper*	839	49.2	
Majority		28	1.6	
Turnout		1,706		
Conservative gain from Labour		Swing		

=== Longford ===
Longford
Party	Candidate	Votes	%	±%
Conservative	L. W. Hall*	1,999	62.8	
Labour	W. Malone	1,186	37.2	
Majority		813	25.6	
Turnout		3,185		
Conservative hold		Swing		

=== Park ===
Park
Party	Candidate	Votes	%	±%
Labour	F. P. Fay*	1,330	53.4	
Conservative	G. H. Evans	1,160	46.6	
Majority		170	6.8	
Turnout		2,490		
Labour hold		Swing		

=== Stretford ===
Stretford
Party	Candidate	Votes	%	±%
Conservative	T. Davies*	1,773	71.4	
Labour	E. Bott	710	28.6	
Majority		1,063	42.8	
Turnout		2,483		
Conservative hold		Swing		

=== Talbot North ===
Talbot North
Party	Candidate	Votes	%	±%
Labour	E. Reid*	1,699	55.6	
Conservative	E. Matthews	1,355	44.4	
Majority		344	11.2	
Turnout		3,054		
Labour hold		Swing		

=== Talbot South ===
Talbot South
Party	Candidate	Votes	%	±%
Conservative	B. Davison*	1,313	65.7	
Labour	A. Ewing	686	34.3	
Majority		627	31.4	
Turnout		1,999		
Conservative hold		Swing		

=== Trafford ===
Trafford
Party	Candidate	Votes	%	±%
Conservative	M. M. Eckersall*	1,418	81.5	
Labour	G. Marsland	322	18.5	
Majority		1,096	63.0	
Turnout		1,740		
Conservative hold		Swing		
