= 1972 Stretford Municipal Borough Council election =

UK local government election

← 1971	4 May 1972	1973 Trafford →

8 of 32 seats to Stretford Municipal Borough Council 16 seats needed for a majority
	First party	Second party
Party	Labour	Conservative
Last election	6 seats, 60.7%	2 seats, 39.1%
Seats before	14	18
Seats won	5	3
Seats after	19	13
Seat change	▲5	▼5
Popular vote	8,908	7,119
Percentage	55.3%	44.2%
Swing	▼5.4%	▲5.1%
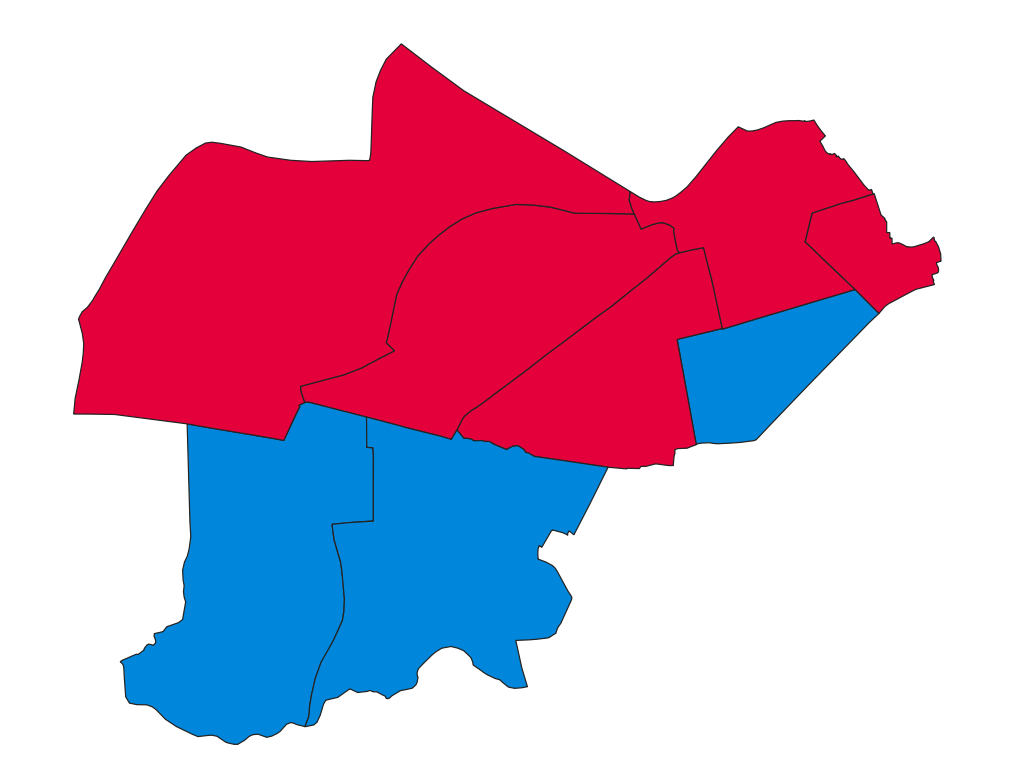
- Map of results of 1972 election
Leader of the Council before election
Conservative
Leader of the Council after election
Labour

Elections to Stretford Council were held on Thursday, 4 May 1972. One third of the councillors were up for election, with each successful candidate to serve a two-year term of office. These were the final elections held in Stretford before it became part of Trafford. The Labour Party gained overall control of the council from the Conservative Party.

== Election result ==
Party	Votes		Seats			Full Council	
Labour Party	8,908 (55.3%)	▼5.4	5 (62.5%)	5 / 8	▲5	19 (59.4%)	19 / 32
Conservative Party	7,119 (44.2%)	▲5.1	3 (37.5%)	3 / 8	▼5	13 (40.6%)	13 / 32
Communist Party	91 (0.6%)	▲0.4	0 (0.0%)	0 / 8	Steady	0 (0.0%)	0 / 32

=== Full council ===
↓
19	13

=== Aldermen ===
↓
4	4

=== Councillors ===
↓
15	9

== Ward results ==
=== Clifford ===
Clifford
Party	Candidate	Votes	%	±%
Labour	J. S. Maher	826	75.6	+2.3
Conservative	A. Kelly	267	24.4	−2.3
Majority		559	51.2	+4.6
Turnout		1,093		
Labour gain from Conservative		Swing		

=== Cornbrook ===
Cornbrook
Party	Candidate	Votes	%	±%
Labour	D. L. Stewart	826	64.1	−5.0
Conservative	R. W. Corke*	463	35.9	+5.0
Majority		363	28.2	−10.0
Turnout		1,289		
Labour gain from Conservative		Swing		

=== Longford ===
Longford
Party	Candidate	Votes	%	±%
Conservative	C. Lever*	1,090	51.3	+0.5
Labour	J. R. Haydock	1,033	48.7	−0.5
Majority		57	2.6	+1.0
Turnout		2,123		
Conservative hold		Swing		

=== Park ===
Park
Party	Candidate	Votes	%	±%
Labour	R. N. Barraclough	1,429	62.5	−5.7
Conservative	M. A. M. Evans	767	33.5	+3.2
Communist	A. Jarratt	91	4.0	+2.5
Majority		662	29.0	−8.9
Turnout		2,287		
Labour gain from Conservative		Swing		

=== Stretford ===
Stretford
Party	Candidate	Votes	%	±%
Conservative	M. Hindley*	1,623	62.1	+8.6
Labour	J. H. Somerville	989	37.9	−8.6
Majority		634	24.2	+17.2
Turnout		2,612		
Conservative hold		Swing		

=== Talbot North ===
Talbot North
Party	Candidate	Votes	%	±%
Labour	J. Bailey	1,607	69.9	−2.6
Conservative	I. M. Farrer	691	30.1	+2.6
Majority		916	39.8	−5.2
Turnout		2,298		
Labour gain from Conservative		Swing		

=== Talbot South ===
Talbot South
Party	Candidate	Votes	%	±%
Labour	R. A. Tully	1,122	54.4	−4.6
Conservative	E. J. Kelson*	939	45.6	+4.6
Majority		183	8.8	−9.2
Turnout		2,061		
Labour gain from Conservative		Swing		

=== Trafford ===
Trafford
Party	Candidate	Votes	%	±%
Conservative	C. Warbrick*	1,279	54.3	+4.5
Labour	V. J. Wynne	1,076	45.7	−4.5
Majority		203	8.6	
Turnout		2,355		
Conservative hold		Swing		
