= 1945 Stretford Municipal Borough Council election =

1945 UK local government election

← 1938	1 November 1945	1946 →

12 of 32 seats to Stretford Municipal Borough Council 16 seats needed for a majority
	First party	Second party	Third party
Party	Conservative	Labour	Liberal
Seats before	18	4	9
Seats won	3	7	2
Seats after	13	9	9
Seat change	▼5	▲5	Steady
Popular vote	12,578	15,939	2,820
Percentage	37.5%	47.5%	8.4%
	Fourth party
Party	Independent
Seats before	1
Seats won	0
Seats after	1
Seat change	Steady
Popular vote	1,458
Percentage	4.3%
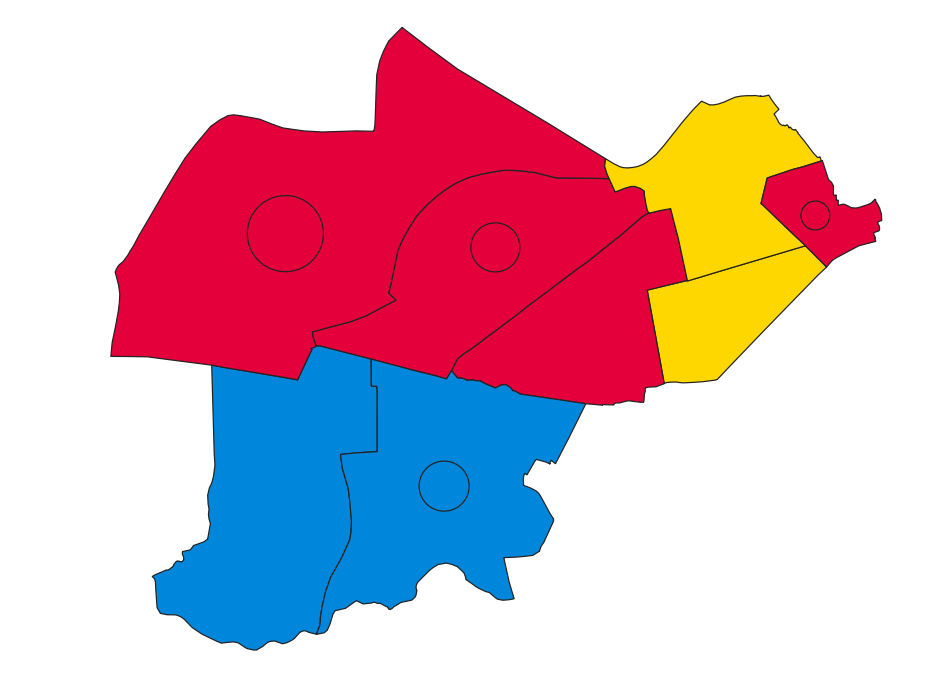
- Map of results of 1945 election
Leader of the Council before election
Conservative
Leader of the Council after election
No overall control

Elections to Stretford Council were held on Thursday, 1 November 1945. One third of the councillors were up for election, with each successful candidate to serve a three-year term of office. The Conservative Party lost overall control of the council. These were the first local elections held in Stretford since the outbreak of the Second World War.

== Election result ==
Party	Votes		Seats			Full Council	
Conservative Party	12,578 (37.5%)		3 (25.0%)	3 / 12	▼5	13 (40.6%)	13 / 32
Labour Party	15,939 (47.5%)		7 (58.3%)	7 / 12	▲5	9 (28.1%)	9 / 32
Liberal Party	2,820 (8.4%)		2 (16.7%)	2 / 12	Steady	9 (28.1%)	9 / 32
Independent	1,458 (4.3%)		0 (0.0%)	0 / 12	Steady	1 (3.1%)	1 / 32
Independent Labour Party	760 (2.3%)	N/A	0 (0.0%)	0 / 12	N/A	0 (0.0%)	0 / 32

=== Full council ===
↓
9	9	1	13

=== Aldermen ===
↓
1	3	1	3

=== Councillors ===
↓
8	6	10

== Ward results ==
=== Clifford ===
Clifford (2 vacancies)
Party	Candidate	Votes	%	±%
Labour	J. Kirkbright	1,107	50.6	
Labour	G. Ney	1,101	50.3	
Conservative	T. Butterworth*	1,091	49.9	
Conservative	W. W. Smith*	1,075	49.2	
Majority		10	0.5	
Turnout		2,187		
Labour gain from Conservative		Swing		
Labour gain from Conservative		Swing		

=== Cornbrook ===
Cornbrook
Party	Candidate	Votes	%	±%
Liberal	F. Ellison*	1,131	57.8	
Labour	J. Stoddart	827	42.2	
Majority		304	15.6	
Turnout		1,958		
Liberal hold		Swing		

=== Longford ===
Longford (2 vacancies)
Party	Candidate	Votes	%	±%
Conservative	E. Forbes*	2,247	59.8	
Conservative	R. T. Lee	1,911	50.8	
Labour	D. C. Moody	1,443	38.4	
Labour	A. Burrows	1,336	35.5	
Independent	F. P. Fay	582	15.5	
Majority		468	12.4	
Turnout		3,760		
Conservative hold		Swing		
Conservative hold		Swing		

=== Park ===
Park (2 vacancies)
Party	Candidate	Votes	%	±%
Labour	H. F. Fox	1,691	62.4	
Labour	H. Ney	1,534	56.6	
Independent	H. Maunders	876	32.3	
Conservative	G. Wakerley	874	32.3	
Ind. Labour Party	W. Hall	260	9.6	
Ind. Labour Party	F. G. Barton	182	6.7	
Majority		658	24.3	
Turnout		2,709		
Labour hold		Swing		
Labour hold		Swing		

=== Stretford ===
Stretford
Party	Candidate	Votes	%	±%
Conservative	A. Trythall*	1,404	55.7	
Labour	E. Alcock	1,118	44.3	
Majority		286	11.4	
Turnout		2,522		
Conservative hold		Swing		

=== Talbot North ===
Talbot North (2 vacancies)
Party	Candidate	Votes	%	±%
Labour	E. Reid	1,693	54.0	
Labour	W. Fearnhead	1,579	50.4	
Conservative	B. Davidson	1,432	45.7	
Conservative	T. Davies*	1,248	39.8	
Ind. Labour Party	J. J. Vivian	160	5.1	
Ind. Labour Party	L. Flash	158	5.0	
Majority		147	4.7	
Turnout		3,135		
Labour gain from Conservative		Swing		
Labour gain from Conservative		Swing		

=== Talbot South ===
Talbot South
Party	Candidate	Votes	%	±%
Labour	E. Hall	1,551	54.5	
Conservative	R. P. Wheeler	1,296	45.5	
Majority		255	9.0	
Turnout		2,847		
Labour gain from Conservative		Swing		

=== Trafford ===
Trafford
Party	Candidate	Votes	%	±%
Liberal	W. Thorpe*	1,689	63.8	
Labour	A. Ward	959	36.2	
Majority		730	27.6	
Turnout		2,648		
Liberal hold		Swing		
