= Municipal Borough of Stretford =

Former local government area in the UK

Coordinates: 53°27′N 2°19′W

Stretford
- Area
  - 1911: 3,240 acres (13.1 km^{2})
  - 1961: 3,532 acres (14.29 km^{2})
- Population
  - 1901: 30,436
  - 1931: 56,791
  - 1971: 54,316
- History
  - Created: 1868
  - Abolished: 1974
  - Succeeded by: Metropolitan Borough of Trafford
- Status: Local Government District 1868–1894 Urban district 1894–1933 Municipal borough 1933–1974
- Government
  - HQ: Stretford Town Hall
  - Motto: Service and Efficiency

Stretford was, from 1868 to 1974, a local government district coterminate with the town of Stretford, Lancashire, England.

== Local Board and Urban District ==
In 1868 the township of Stretford adopted the Local Government Act 1858, and a local board was formed to govern the town. In 1889 the district became part of the administrative county of Lancashire.

The Local Government Act 1894 reconstituted the local board's area as Stretford Urban District. An urban district council of eighteen members replaced the local board. The urban district was divided into six wards, each returning three councillors: Clifford, Cornbrook, Longford, Stretford, Talbot and Trafford.

In 1933 the urban district was enlarged when the Davyhulme area was added on the abolition of the neighbouring Barton upon Irwell Rural District by a county review order.

== Municipal borough ==
In 1933 the urban district was granted a charter of incorporation and Stretford became a municipal borough. The charter was formally presented by the Earl of Derby, Lord Lieutenant of Lancashire at a Charter Day celebration held on 16 September. At the same time the Earl officially opened the Town Hall.

=== Political control ===
The borough council consisted of a mayor, eight aldermen and twenty-four councillors. The charter mayor was Sir Thomas Robinson, who had been Member of Parliament for the Stretford constituency until 1931. One third of the councillors were elected annually, while half of the aldermen were chosen by the council every three years. The Conservative Party controlled the borough from 1933 to 1945. From 1945 to 1947 the council was under no overall control. The Conservatives regained control in 1947 and held it until 1962. After two years with no party in a majority, the Labour and Conservative parties alternated in power for the last ten years of the borough's existence: Labour had a majority from 1964 to 1967, Conservatives 1967 to 1972 and Labour from 1972 to 1974.

=== Coat of arms ===
On 20 February 1933, Stretford Urban District Council was granted armorial bearings by the College of Arms. The arms continued in use when the borough was incorporated. The arms were blazoned as follows:

Argent, on a fesse gules between in chief a flail and a scythe in saltire proper between two roses of the second, barbed and seeded, and in base upon waves of the sea a lymphad, sails furled, oars in action, proper a lion passant Or; and for a Crest: Issuant from a coronet composed of eight roses as in the Arms set upon a rim Or, a cubit arm, the hand proper grasping a thunderboltgold. Mantled gules doubled Or.

The lion in the centre of the shield represented John of Gaunt, while the red roses were the county emblems for Lancashire. The "lymphad" or ancient ship at the base of the arms indicated that the area had maritime connections via the Rivers Mersey and Irwell. The arms were completed by a crossed flail and scythe. The scythe was emblematic of the agricultural past of the area, while the flail came from the arms of the Trafford family.

The crest on the helm above the shield was an arm grasping a golden thunderbolt, symbolising the modern industries of Stretford. The design was completed by a coronet of Lancastrian roses.

=== Abolition ===
The borough was abolished by the Local Government Act 1972, and its former area transferred to the new county of Greater Manchester in 1974, to form part of the Metropolitan Borough of Trafford.

== Local elections ==
- 1933 Stretford Municipal Borough Council election
- 1934 Stretford Municipal Borough Council election
- 1935 Stretford Municipal Borough Council election
- 1936 Stretford Municipal Borough Council election
- 1937 Stretford Municipal Borough Council election
- 1938 Stretford Municipal Borough Council election
- 1945 Stretford Municipal Borough Council election
- 1946 Stretford Municipal Borough Council election
- 1947 Stretford Municipal Borough Council election
- 1949 Stretford Municipal Borough Council election
- 1950 Stretford Municipal Borough Council election
- 1951 Stretford Municipal Borough Council election
- 1952 Stretford Municipal Borough Council election
- 1953 Stretford Municipal Borough Council election
- 1954 Stretford Municipal Borough Council election
- 1955 Stretford Municipal Borough Council election
- 1956 Stretford Municipal Borough Council election
- 1957 Stretford Municipal Borough Council election
- 1958 Stretford Municipal Borough Council election
- 1959 Stretford Municipal Borough Council election
- 1960 Stretford Municipal Borough Council election
- 1961 Stretford Municipal Borough Council election
- 1962 Stretford Municipal Borough Council election
- 1963 Stretford Municipal Borough Council election
- 1964 Stretford Municipal Borough Council election
- 1965 Stretford Municipal Borough Council election
- 1966 Stretford Municipal Borough Council election
- 1967 Stretford Municipal Borough Council election
- 1968 Stretford Municipal Borough Council election
- 1969 Stretford Municipal Borough Council election
- 1970 Stretford Municipal Borough Council election
- 1971 Stretford Municipal Borough Council election
- 1972 Stretford Municipal Borough Council election
