= 1965 Stretford Municipal Borough Council election =

UK local government election

- 13 May 1965

8 of 32 seats to Stretford Municipal Borough Council 16 seats needed for a majority
	First party	Second party
Party	Labour	Conservative
Last election	5 seats, 47.2%	3 seats, 36.9%
Seats before	17	13
Seats won	4	4
Seats after	17	15
Seat change	Steady	▲2
Popular vote	6,474	6,904
Percentage	41.8%	44.6%
Swing	▼5.4%	▲7.7%
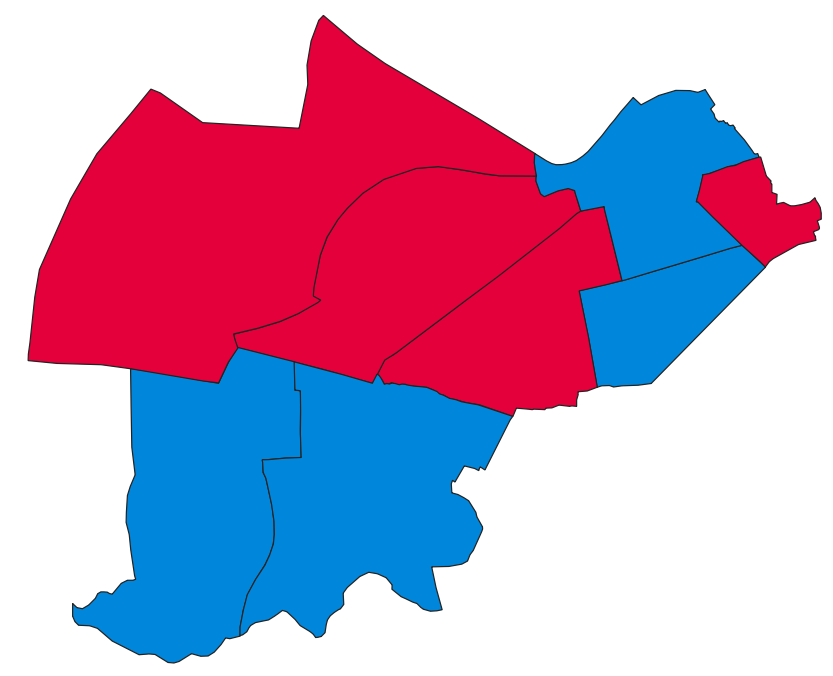
- Map of results of 1965 election
Leader of the Council before election
Labour
Leader of the Council after election
Labour

Elections to Stretford Council were held on Thursday, 13 May 1965. One third of the councillors were up for election, with each successful candidate to serve a three-year term of office. The Labour Party retained overall control.

== Election result ==
Party	Votes		Seats			Full Council	
Labour Party	6,474 (41.8%)	▼5.4	4 (50.0%)	4 / 8	Steady	17 (53.1%)	17 / 32
Conservative Party	6,904 (44.6%)	▲7.7	4 (50.0%)	4 / 8	▲2	15 (46.9%)	15 / 32
Liberal Party	1,638 (10.6%)	▼4.9	0 (0.0%)	0 / 8	▼2	0 (0.0%)	0 / 32
Independent Conservative	402 (2.6%)	N/A	0 (0.0%)	0 / 8	N/A	0 (0.0%)	0 / 32
Communist Party	57 (0.4%)	Steady	0 (0.0%)	0 / 8	Steady	0 (0.0%)	0 / 32

=== Full council ===
↓
17	15

=== Aldermen ===
↓
4	4

=== Councillors ===
↓
13	11

== Ward results ==
=== Clifford ===
Clifford
Party	Candidate	Votes	%	±%
Labour	J. C. Shaw	666	58.6	−11.4
Conservative	C. Hamilton	471	41.4	+11.4
Majority		195	17.2	−22.8
Turnout		1,137		
Labour hold		Swing		

=== Cornbrook ===
Cornbrook
Party	Candidate	Votes	%	±%
Conservative	J. J. Ward	699	43.2	+15.7
Labour	V. Cooling*	667	41.2	−13.2
Liberal	C. Christian	251	15.6	−2.5
Majority		32	2.0	
Turnout		1,617		
Conservative gain from Labour		Swing		

=== Longford ===
Longford
Party	Candidate	Votes	%	±%
Conservative	M. Merritt	1,443	63.9	+4.0
Labour	H. Pollard	814	36.1	−4.0
Majority		629	27.8	+8.0
Turnout		2,257		
Conservative hold		Swing		

=== Park ===
Park
Party	Candidate	Votes	%	±%
Labour	A. S. Clough*	1,106	56.1	−8.0
Conservative	B. Boulton	808	41.0	+8.3
Communist	V. Eddisford	57	2.9	−0.3
Majority		298	15.1	−16.3
Turnout		1,971		
Labour hold		Swing		

=== Stretford ===
Stretford
Party	Candidate	Votes	%	±%
Conservative	H. Jones	1,537	68.2	+20.1
Labour	D. F. Sullivan	716	31.8	+0.4
Majority		821	36.4	+19.7
Turnout		2,253		
Conservative gain from Liberal		Swing		

=== Talbot North ===
Talbot North
Party	Candidate	Votes	%	±%
Labour	W. Fearnhead*	1,157	62.5	−5.6
Liberal	W. Ellis	693	37.5	+5.6
Majority		464	25.0	−11.2
Turnout		1,850		
Labour hold		Swing		

=== Talbot South ===
Talbot South
Party	Candidate	Votes	%	±%
Labour	H. Davies	922	42.2	−3.9
Conservative	F. Heap*	860	39.4	−3.8
Ind. Conservative	J. Maxted	402	18.4	N/A
Majority		62	2.8	−0.1
Turnout		2,182		
Labour gain from Conservative		Swing		

=== Trafford ===
Trafford
Party	Candidate	Votes	%	±%
Conservative	J. E. Schofield	1,086	49.2	+6.4
Liberal	R. W. Corke*	694	31.5	−4.0
Labour	I. Clough	426	19.3	−2.4
Majority		392	17.7	+10.4
Turnout		2,206		
Conservative gain from Liberal		Swing		
