= 1959 Stretford Municipal Borough Council election =

UK local government election

- 7 May 1959

8 of 32 seats to Stretford Municipal Borough Council 16 seats needed for a majority
	First party	Second party
Party	Conservative	Labour
Last election	4 seats, 53.0%	4 seats, 46.6%
Seats before	18	14
Seats won	4	4
Seats after	18	14
Seat change	Steady	Steady
Popular vote	9,602	8,063
Percentage	51.6%	43.3%
Swing	▼1.4%	▼3.3%
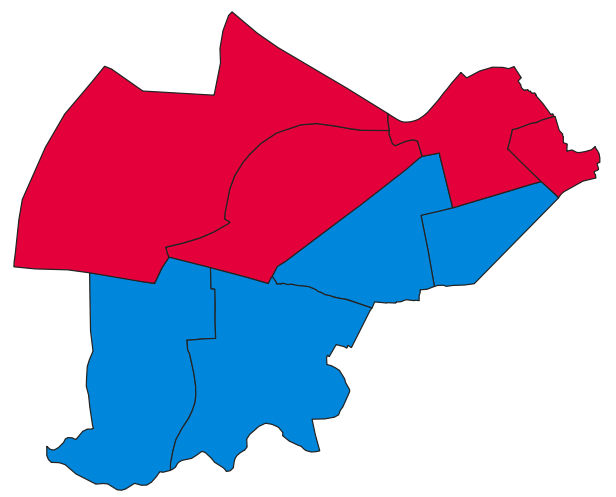
- Map of results of 1959 election
Leader of the Council before election
Conservative
Leader of the Council after election
Conservative

Elections to Stretford Council were held on Thursday, 7 May 1959. One third of the councillors were up for election, with each successful candidate to serve a three-year term of office. The Conservative Party retained overall control of the council.

== Election result ==
Party	Votes		Seats			Full Council	
Conservative Party	9,602 (51.6%)	▼1.4	4 (50.0%)	4 / 8	Steady	18 (56.3%)	18 / 32
Labour Party	8,063 (43.3%)	▼3.3	4 (50.0%)	4 / 8	Steady	14 (43.7%)	14 / 32
Liberal Party	887 (4.8%)	N/A	0 (0.0%)	0 / 8	N/A	0 (0.0%)	0 / 32
Communist Party	53 (0.3%)	▼0.1	0 (0.0%)	0 / 8	Steady	0 (0.0%)	0 / 32

=== Full council ===
↓
14	18

=== Aldermen ===
↓
2	6

=== Councillors ===
↓
12	12

== Ward results ==
=== Clifford ===
Clifford
Party	Candidate	Votes	%	±%
Labour	H. Maynard*	1,071	60.5	+0.3
Conservative	C. R. Hamilton	700	39.5	−0.3
Majority		371	21.0	+0.6
Turnout		1,771		
Labour hold		Swing		

=== Cornbrook ===
Cornbrook
Party	Candidate	Votes	%	±%
Labour	H. Pyper*	1,130	54.8	+0.7
Conservative	H. H. Black	932	45.2	−0.7
Majority		198	9.6	+1.4
Turnout		2,062		
Labour hold		Swing		

=== Longford ===
Longford
Party	Candidate	Votes	%	±%
Conservative	E. M. Macpherson*	1,655	63.6	+1.1
Labour	G. Marland	947	36.4	−1.1
Majority		708	27.2	+2.2
Turnout		2,602		
Conservative hold		Swing		

=== Park ===
Park
Party	Candidate	Votes	%	±%
Labour	H. Armitage*	1,486	56.8	−0.6
Conservative	W. P. Downs	1,078	41.2	+1.3
Communist	V. Eddisford	53	2.0	−0.7
Majority		408	15.6	−1.9
Turnout		2,617		
Labour hold		Swing		

=== Stretford ===
Stretford
Party	Candidate	Votes	%	±%
Conservative	F. Matthews*	1,451	47.8	−16.4
Liberal	J. C. Owen	887	29.2	N/A
Labour	P. Barton	699	23.0	−12.8
Majority		564	18.6	−9.8
Turnout		3,037		
Conservative hold		Swing		

=== Talbot North ===
Talbot North
Party	Candidate	Votes	%	±%
Labour	W. Fearnhead*	1,542	60.0	−7.6
Conservative	A. Holderness	1,026	40.0	+7.6
Majority		516	20.0	−15.2
Turnout		2,568		
Labour hold		Swing		

=== Talbot South ===
Talbot South
Party	Candidate	Votes	%	±%
Conservative	F. W. Heap*	1,265	62.1	−3.4
Labour	E. Allcock	772	37.9	+3.4
Majority		493	24.2	−6.8
Turnout		2,037		
Conservative hold		Swing		

=== Trafford ===
Trafford
Party	Candidate	Votes	%	±%
Conservative	W. Berry*	1,495	78.2	+2.6
Labour	A. Hillson	416	21.8	−2.6
Majority		1,079	56.4	+5.2
Turnout		1,911		
Conservative hold		Swing		
