= 1968 Stretford Municipal Borough Council election =

UK local government election

- 9 May 1968

8 of 32 seats to Stretford Municipal Borough Council 16 seats needed for a majority
	First party	Second party
Party	Conservative	Labour
Last election	6 seats, 53.9%	2 seats, 37.2%
Seats before	17	15
Seats won	7	1
Seats after	20	12
Seat change	▲3	▼3
Popular vote	9,093	4,469
Percentage	63.6%	31.3%
Swing	▲9.7%	▼5.9%
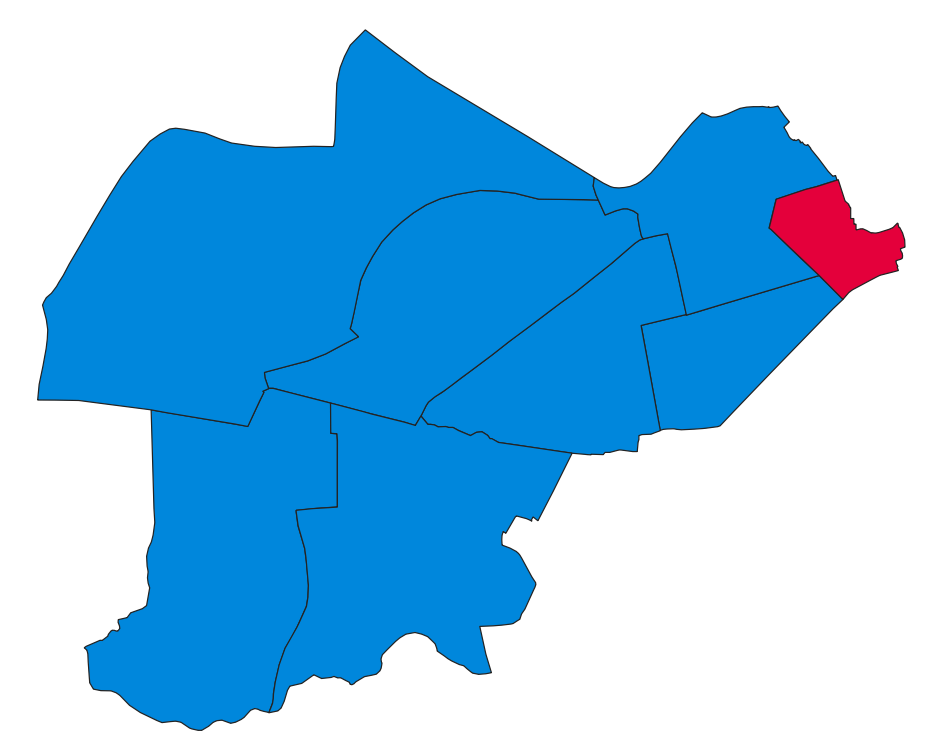
- Map of results of 1968 election
Leader of the Council before election
Conservative
Leader of the Council after election
Conservative

Elections to Stretford Council were held on Thursday, 9 May 1968. One third of the councillors were up for election, with each successful candidate to serve a three-year term of office. The Conservative Party retained overall control of the council.

== Election result ==
Party	Votes		Seats			Full Council	
Conservative Party	9,093 (63.6%)	▲9.7	7 (87.5%)	7 / 8	▲3	20 (62.5%)	20 / 32
Labour Party	4,469 (31.3%)	▼5.9	1 (12.5%)	1 / 8	▼3	12 (37.5%)	12 / 32
Liberal Party	679 (4.7%)	▼3.4	0 (0.0%)	0 / 8	Steady	0 (0.0%)	0 / 32
Communist Party	58 (0.4%)	▼0.2	0 (0.0%)	0 / 8	Steady	0 (0.0%)	0 / 32

=== Full council ===
↓
12	20

=== Aldermen ===
↓
4	4

=== Councillors ===
↓
8	16

== Ward results ==
=== Clifford ===
Clifford
Party	Candidate	Votes	%	±%
Labour	J. Shaw*	712	55.7	+7.3
Conservative	N. Quinn	566	44.3	−7.3
Majority		146	11.4	
Turnout		1,278		
Labour hold		Swing		

=== Cornbrook ===
Cornbrook
Party	Candidate	Votes	%	±%
Conservative	J. J. Ward*	785	60.6	+11.8
Labour	D. L. Stewart	511	39.4	+0.3
Majority		274	21.2	+11.5
Turnout		1,296		
Conservative hold		Swing		

=== Longford ===
Longford
Party	Candidate	Votes	%	±%
Conservative	E. Forbes	1,390	73.4	+12.3
Labour	A. Bates	504	26.6	−4.6
Majority		886	46.8	+16.9
Turnout		1,894		
Conservative hold		Swing		

=== Park ===
Park
Party	Candidate	Votes	%	±%
Conservative	M. A. M. Evans	1,122	58.3	+13.4
Labour	A. S. Clough*	584	30.4	−20.1
Liberal	C. R. Hedley	159	8.3	N/A
Communist	A. Jarratt	58	3.0	−1.6
Majority		538	27.9	
Turnout		1,923		
Conservative gain from Labour		Swing		

=== Stretford ===
Stretford
Party	Candidate	Votes	%	±%
Conservative	H. H. Jones*	1,814	76.3	+10.6
Labour	K. Silcock	343	14.4	−7.5
Liberal	R. J. Allan	221	9.3	−3.1
Majority		1,471	61.9	+18.1
Turnout		2,378		
Conservative hold		Swing		

=== Talbot North ===
Talbot North
Party	Candidate	Votes	%	±%
Conservative	R. Gregory	1,205	58.0	+10.6
Labour	W. Fearnhead*	874	42.0	−10.6
Majority		331	16.0	
Turnout		2,079		
Conservative gain from Labour		Swing		

=== Talbot South ===
Talbot South
Party	Candidate	Votes	%	±%
Conservative	A. Kelly	1,055	58.4	+4.8
Labour	H. Davies*	661	36.6	+1.7
Liberal	R. B. Burke	91	5.0	−4.7
Majority		394	21.8	+3.1
Turnout		1,807		
Conservative gain from Labour		Swing		

=== Trafford ===
Trafford
Party	Candidate	Votes	%	±%
Conservative	J. E. Schofield*	1,156	70.3	+18.3
Labour	N. Wrigley	280	17.0	−9.0
Liberal	C. Christian	208	12.7	−9.3
Majority		876	53.3	+27.3
Turnout		1,644		
Conservative hold		Swing		
