= 1946 Stretford Municipal Borough Council election =

1946 UK local government election

← 1945	1 November 1946	1947 →

8 of 32 seats to Stretford Municipal Borough Council 16 seats needed for a majority
	First party	Second party	Third party
Party	Conservative	Labour	Liberal
Last election	3 seats, 37.5%	7 seats, 47.5%	2 seats, 8.4%
Seats before	13	9	10
Seats won	4	2	2
Seats after	13	10	9
Seat change	Steady	▲1	▼1
Popular vote	7,643	9,328	4,393
Percentage	35.2%	43.0%	20.3%
Swing	▼2.3%	▼4.5%	▲11.9%
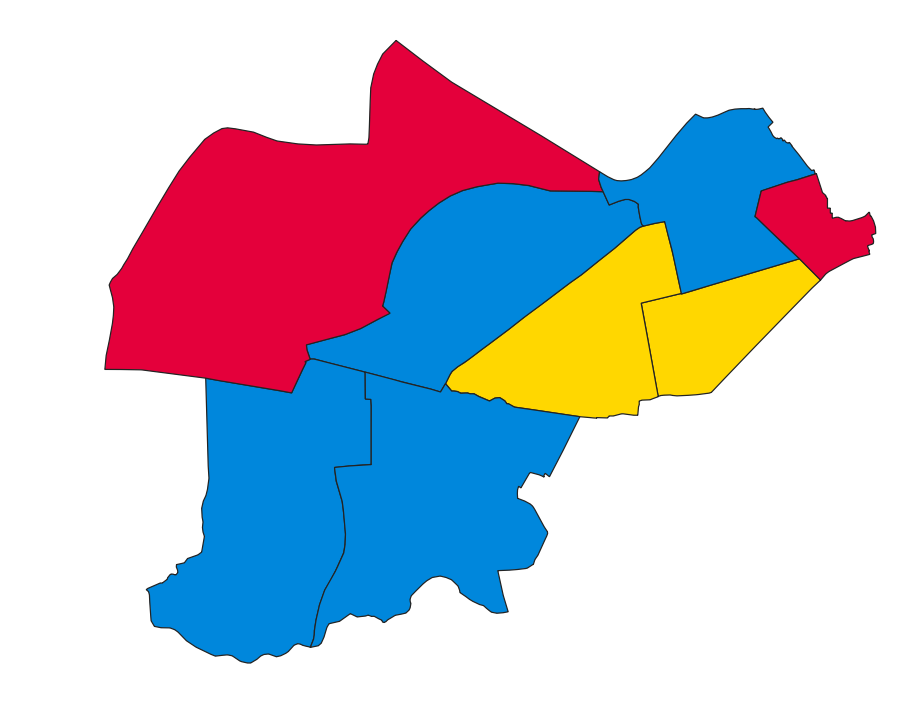
- Map of results of 1946 election
Leader of the Council before election
No overall control
Leader of the Council after election
No overall control

Elections to Stretford Council were held on Friday, 1 November 1946. One third of the councillors were up for election, with each successful candidate to serve a three-year term of office. The council remained under no overall control.

== Election result ==
Party	Votes		Seats			Full Council	
Conservative Party	7,643 (35.2%)	▼2.3	4 (50.0%)	4 / 8	Steady	13 (40.6%)	13 / 32
Labour Party	9,328 (43.0%)	▼4.5	1 (25.0%)	2 / 8	▲1	10 (31.3%)	10 / 32
Liberal Party	4,393 (20.3%)	▲11.9	2 (25.0%)	2 / 8	▼1	9 (28.1%)	9 / 32
Communist Party	123 (0.6%)	N/A	0 (0.0%)	0 / 8	N/A	0 (0.0%)	0 / 32
Independent Labour Party	116 (0.5%)	▼1.8	0 (0.0%)	0 / 8	Steady	0 (0.0%)	0 / 32
Independent	81 (0.4%)	▼3.9	0 (0.0%)	0 / 8	Steady	0 (0.0%)	0 / 32

=== Full council ===
↓
10	9	13

=== Aldermen ===
↓
1	4	3

=== Councillors ===
↓
9	5	10

== Ward results ==
=== Clifford ===
Clifford
Party	Candidate	Votes	%	±%
Labour	E. Cavanagh	962	52.5	+1.9
Liberal	H. H. Eckersall	788	43.0	N/A
Independent	A. Dillon	81	4.4	N/A
Majority		174	9.5	+9.0
Turnout		1,831		
Labour gain from Liberal		Swing		

=== Cornbrook ===
Cornbrook
Party	Candidate	Votes	%	±%
Conservative	H. S. Holt*	1,207	56.4	N/A
Labour	J. Stoddart	932	43.6	+1.4
Majority		275	12.8	
Turnout		2,139		
Conservative hold		Swing		

=== Longford ===
Longford
Party	Candidate	Votes	%	±%
Conservative	E. M. Robinson*	1,914	57.8	−2.0
Labour	H. Pyper	1,396	42.2	+3.8
Majority		518	15.6	+3.2
Turnout		3,310		
Conservative hold		Swing		

=== Park ===
Park
Party	Candidate	Votes	%	±%
Labour	H. S. Armitage	1,535	56.7	−5.7
Conservative	W. P. Downes	1,171	43.3	+11.0
Majority		364	13.4	−10.9
Turnout		2,706		
Labour hold		Swing		

=== Stretford ===
Stretford
Party	Candidate	Votes	%	±%
Conservative	W. Hewerdine	1,880	61.3	+5.6
Labour	G. H. Evans	1,185	38.7	−5.6
Majority		695	22.6	+11.2
Turnout		3,065		
Conservative hold		Swing		

=== Talbot North ===
Talbot North
Party	Candidate	Votes	%	±%
Conservative	T. Grieve*	1,471	48.0	+2.3
Labour	G. R. Parker	1,411	46.0	−8.0
Communist	R. Watts	123	4.0	N/A
Ind. Labour Party	L. Flash	62	2.0	−3.1
Majority		60	2.0	
Turnout		3,067		
Conservative hold		Swing		

=== Talbot South ===
Talbot South
Party	Candidate	Votes	%	±%
Liberal	E. Hargreaves*	1,580	56.2	N/A
Labour	W. E. Dutton	1,179	41.9	−12.6
Ind. Labour Party	F. G. Barton	54	1.9	N/A
Majority		401	14.3	
Turnout		2,813		
Liberal hold		Swing		

=== Trafford ===
Trafford
Party	Candidate	Votes	%	±%
Liberal	P. Thomason*	2,025	73.6	+9.8
Labour	A. Wilcox	728	26.4	−9.8
Majority		1,297	47.2	+19.4
Turnout		2,753		
Liberal hold		Swing		
