= 1947 Stretford Municipal Borough Council election =

1947 UK local government election

← 1946	1 November 1947	1949 →

8 of 32 seats to Stretford Municipal Borough Council 16 seats needed for a majority
	First party	Second party	Third party
Party	Conservative	Liberal	Labour
Last election	4 seats, 35.2%	2 seats, 20.3%	2 seats, 43.0%
Seats before	16	7	9
Seats won	7	1	0
Seats after	20	7	5
Seat change	▲4	Steady	▼4
Popular vote	15,243	2,750	11,354
Percentage	51.7%	9.3%	38.5%
Swing	▲16.5%	▼11.0%	▼4.5%
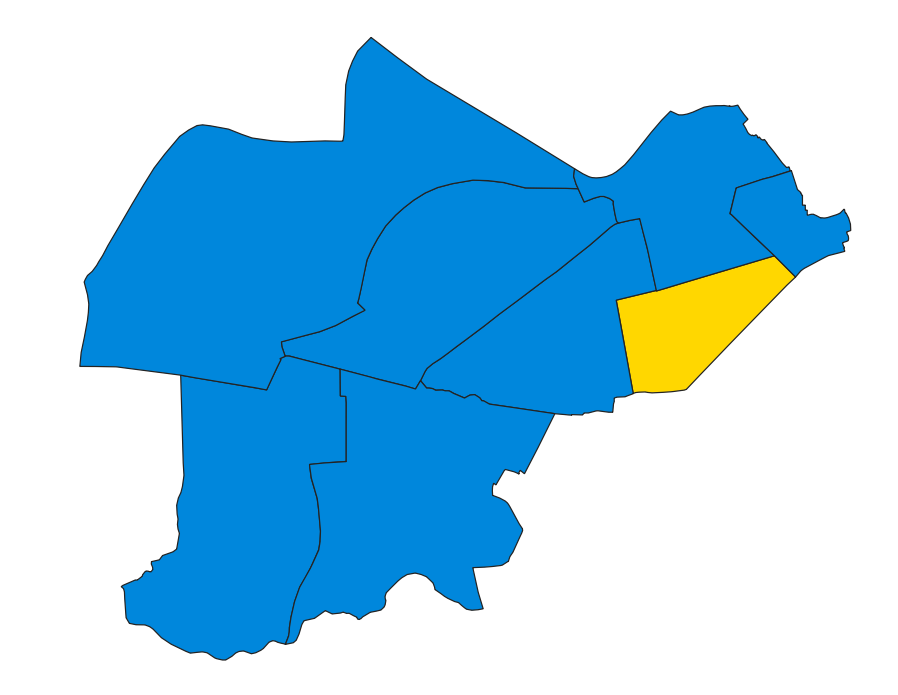
- Map of results of 1947 election
Leader of the Council before election
Conservative
Leader of the Council after election
Conservative

Elections to Stretford Council were held on Saturday, 1 November 1947. One third of the councillors were up for election, with each successful candidate to serve a three-year term of office. The Conservative Party retained overall control of the council.

== Election result ==
Party	Votes		Seats			Full Council	
Conservative Party	15,243 (51.7%)	▲16.5	7 (87.5%)	7 / 8	▲4	20 (62.5%)	20 / 32
Liberal Party	2,750 (9.3%)	▼11.0	1 (12.5%)	1 / 8	Steady	7 (21.9%)	7 / 32
Labour Party	11,354 (38.5%)	▼4.5	0 (0.0%)	0 / 8	▼4	5 (15.6%)	5 / 32
Communist Party	135 (0.5%)	▼0.1	0 (0.0%)	0 / 8	Steady	0 (0.0%)	0 / 32

=== Full council ===
↓
5	7	20

=== Aldermen ===
↓
1	2	5

=== Councillors ===
↓
4	5	15

== Ward results ==
=== Clifford ===
Clifford
Party	Candidate	Votes	%	±%
Conservative	T. Butterworth	1,942	58.9	N/A
Labour	G. Ney*	1,286	39.0	−13.5
Communist	R. Watts	68	2.1	N/A
Majority		656	19.9	
Turnout		3,296		
Conservative gain from Labour		Swing		

=== Cornbrook ===
Cornbrook
Party	Candidate	Votes	%	±%
Conservative	J. M. Maxted	1,926	60.3	+3.9
Labour	J. Stoddart	1,269	39.7	−3.9
Majority		657	20.6	
Turnout		3,195		
Conservative hold		Swing		

=== Longford ===
Longford
Party	Candidate	Votes	%	±%
Conservative	R. T. Lee*	2,576	62.4	+4.6
Labour	H. Pyper	1,552	37.6	−4.6
Majority		1,024	24.8	+9.2
Turnout		4,128		
Conservative hold		Swing		

=== Park ===
Park
Party	Candidate	Votes	%	±%
Conservative	W. P. Downes	1,926	52.0	+8.7
Labour	H. Ney*	1,778	48.0	−8.7
Majority		148	4.0	
Turnout		3,704		
Conservative gain from Labour		Swing		

=== Stretford ===
Stretford
Party	Candidate	Votes	%	±%
Conservative	F. Cawley*	2,446	65.5	+4.2
Labour	G. H. Evans	1,291	34.5	−4.2
Majority		1,155	31.0	+8.4
Turnout		3,737		
Conservative hold		Swing		

=== Talbot North ===
Talbot North
Party	Candidate	Votes	%	±%
Conservative	F. Matthews	2,114	50.6	+2.6
Labour	W. Fearnhead*	2,000	47.8	+1.8
Communist	A. Bates	67	1.6	−2.4
Majority		114	2.7	+0.7
Turnout		4,181		
Conservative gain from Labour		Swing		

=== Talbot South ===
Talbot South
Party	Candidate	Votes	%	±%
Conservative	A. W. Davison	2,313	61.0	N/A
Labour	E. Hall*	1,481	39.0	−2.9
Majority		832	22.0	
Turnout		3,794		
Conservative gain from Labour		Swing		

=== Trafford ===
Trafford
Party	Candidate	Votes	%	±%
Liberal	W. R. Cannell*	2,750	79.8	+6.2
Labour	S. Bradshaw	697	20.2	−6.2
Majority		2,053	59.6	+12.4
Turnout		3,447		
Liberal hold		Swing		
