= 1962 Stretford Municipal Borough Council election =

UK local government election

- 10 May 1962

8 of 32 seats to Stretford Municipal Borough Council 16 seats needed for a majority
	First party	Second party	Third party
Party	Labour	Conservative	Liberal
Last election	4 seats, 42.0%	4 seats, 48.2%	0 seats, 7.5%
Seats before	15	17	0
Seats won	4	2	2
Seats after	15	15	2
Seat change	Steady	▼2	▲2
Popular vote	8,708	7,483	2,934
Percentage	45.4%	39.0%	15.3%
Swing	▲3.4%	▼9.2%	▲7.8%
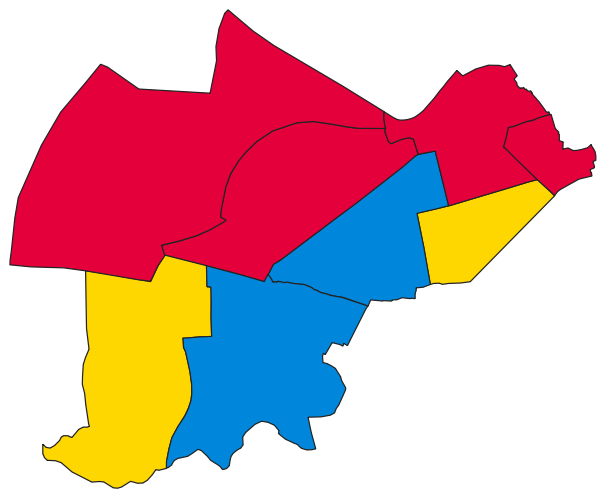
- Map of results of 1962 election
Leader of the Council before election
Conservative
Leader of the Council after election
No overall control

Elections to Stretford Council were held on Thursday, 10 May 1962. One third of the councillors were up for election, with each successful candidate to serve a three-year term of office. The Conservative Party lost overall control of the council.

== Election result ==
Party	Votes		Seats			Full Council	
Labour Party	8,708 (45.4%)	▲3.4	4 (50.0%)	4 / 8	Steady	15 (46.9%)	15 / 32
Conservative Party	7,483 (39.0%)	▼9.2	2 (25.0%)	2 / 8	▼2	15 (46.9%)	15 / 32
Liberal Party	2,934 (15.3%)	▲7.8	2 (25.0%)	2 / 8	▲2	2 (6.3%)	2 / 32
Communist Party	68 (0.4%)	▲0.1	0 (0.0%)	0 / 8	Steady	0 (0.0%)	0 / 32

=== Full council ===
↓
15	2	15

=== Aldermen ===
↓
3	5

=== Councillors ===
↓
12	2	10

== Ward results ==
=== Clifford ===
Clifford
Party	Candidate	Votes	%	±%
Labour	H. Maynard*	1,093	66.6	+5.4
Conservative	A. C. Broadbent	547	33.4	−5.4
Majority		546	33.2	+10.8
Turnout		1,640		
Labour hold		Swing		

=== Cornbrook ===
Cornbrook
Party	Candidate	Votes	%	±%
Labour	H. Pyper*	1,238	61.5	+7.9
Conservative	J. E. Schofield	776	38.5	−7.9
Majority		462	23.0	+15.8
Turnout		2,014		
Labour hold		Swing		

=== Longford ===
Longford
Party	Candidate	Votes	%	±%
Conservative	E. M. Macpherson*	1,108	41.6	−9.2
Labour	T. Jordan	827	31.0	+0.4
Liberal	R. P. Swain	729	27.4	+8.8
Majority		281	10.6	−9.6
Turnout		2,664		
Conservative hold		Swing		

=== Park ===
Park
Party	Candidate	Votes	%	±%
Labour	H. S. Armitage*	1,886	67.3	+16.3
Conservative	S. Till	850	30.3	−5.4
Communist	V. Eddisford	68	2.4	+0.8
Majority		1,036	37.0	+21.7
Turnout		2,804		
Labour hold		Swing		

=== Stretford ===
Stretford
Party	Candidate	Votes	%	±%
Liberal	J. C. Owen	1,265	41.4	+10.1
Conservative	F. Matthews*	1,056	34.6	−12.4
Labour	V. Cooling	731	24.0	+2.3
Majority		209	6.8	
Turnout		3,052		
Liberal gain from Conservative		Swing		

=== Talbot North ===
Talbot North
Party	Candidate	Votes	%	±%
Labour	W. Fearnhead*	1,581	57.6	+3.0
Conservative	M. M. Hayden	1,166	42.4	−3.0
Majority		415	15.2	+6.0
Turnout		2,747		
Labour hold		Swing		

=== Talbot South ===
Talbot South
Party	Candidate	Votes	%	±%
Conservative	F. W. Heap*	1,118	53.4	−5.6
Labour	A. S. Clough	977	46.6	+5.6
Majority		141	6.8	−11.2
Turnout		2,095		
Conservative hold		Swing		

=== Trafford ===
Trafford
Party	Candidate	Votes	%	±%
Liberal	R. W. Corke	940	43.2	N/A
Conservative	W. Berry*	862	39.6	−35.3
Labour	I. McDowall	375	17.2	−7.9
Majority		78	3.6	
Turnout		2,177		
Liberal gain from Conservative		Swing		
