= 1956 Stretford Municipal Borough Council election =

UK local government election

- 10 May 1956

8 of 32 seats to Stretford Municipal Borough Council 16 seats needed for a majority
	First party	Second party
Party	Conservative	Labour
Last election	6 seats, 58.9%	2 seats, 41.1%
Seats before	20	10
Seats won	4	4
Seats after	21	11
Seat change	▼1	▲1
Popular vote	8,661	8,164
Percentage	51.5%	48.5%
Swing	▼7.5%	▲7.5%
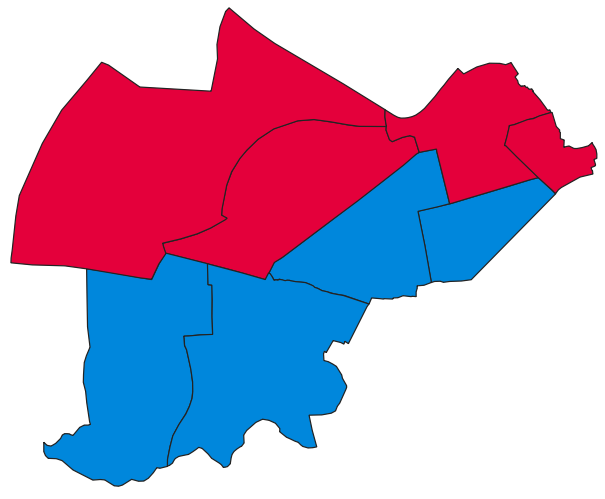
- Map of results of 1955 election
Leader of the Council before election
Conservative
Leader of the Council after election
Conservative

Elections to Stretford Council were held on Thursday, 10 May 1956. One third of the councillors were up for election, with each successful candidate to serve a three-year term of office. The Conservative Party retained overall control of the council.

== Election result ==
Party	Votes		Seats			Full Council	
Conservative Party	8,661 (51.5%)	▼7.4	4 (50.0%)	4 / 8	▼1	21 (65.6%)	21 / 32
Labour Party	8,164 (48.5%)	▲7.4	4 (50.0%)	4 / 8	▲1	11 (34.4%)	11 / 32

=== Full council ===
↓
11	21

=== Aldermen ===
↓
2	6

=== Councillors ===
↓
9	15

== Ward results ==
=== Clifford ===
Clifford
Party	Candidate	Votes	%	±%
Labour	H. Maynard*	1,001	52.1	+7.1
Conservative	F. Lawson	920	47.9	−7.1
Majority		81	4.2	
Turnout		1,921		
Labour hold		Swing		

=== Cornbrook ===
Cornbrook
Party	Candidate	Votes	%	±%
Labour	H. Pyper	921	54.4	+5.2
Conservative	H. McNeil	771	45.6	−5.2
Majority		150	8.8	
Turnout		1,692		
Labour gain from Conservative		Swing		

=== Longford ===
Longford
Party	Candidate	Votes	%	±%
Conservative	E. M. Macpherson*	1,425	56.8	−6.0
Labour	F. Barton	1,085	43.2	+6.0
Majority		340	13.6	−12.0
Turnout		2,510		
Conservative hold		Swing		

=== Park ===
Park
Party	Candidate	Votes	%	±%
Labour	H. S. Armitage*	1,537	69.2	+15.8
Conservative	V. Healey	684	30.8	−15.8
Majority		853	38.4	+31.6
Turnout		2,221		
Labour hold		Swing		

=== Stretford ===
Stretford
Party	Candidate	Votes	%	±%
Conservative	F. Matthews	1,444	63.9	−7.5
Labour	E. Bott	817	36.1	+7.5
Majority		627	27.8	−15.0
Turnout		2,261		
Conservative hold		Swing		

=== Talbot North ===
Talbot North
Party	Candidate	Votes	%	±%
Labour	W. Fearnhead*	1,583	60.7	+5.1
Conservative	G. F. Evans	1,026	39.3	−5.1
Majority		557	21.4	+10.2
Turnout		2,609		
Labour hold		Swing		

=== Talbot South ===
Talbot South
Party	Candidate	Votes	%	±%
Conservative	F. W. Heap*	1,104	58.1	−7.6
Labour	E. Cavanagh	795	41.9	+7.6
Majority		309	16.2	−15.2
Turnout		1,899		
Conservative hold		Swing		

=== Trafford ===
Trafford
Party	Candidate	Votes	%	±%
Conservative	W. Berry	1,287	75.2	−6.3
Labour	E. Hall	425	24.8	+6.3
Majority		862	50.4	−12.6
Turnout		1,712		
Conservative hold		Swing		
