= 1958 Stretford Municipal Borough Council election =

UK local government election

- 8 May 1958

8 of 32 seats to Stretford Municipal Borough Council 16 seats needed for a majority
	First party	Second party
Party	Conservative	Labour
Last election	4 seats, 50.6%	4 seats, 49.4%
Seats before	20	12
Seats won	4	4
Seats after	18	14
Seat change	▼2	▲2
Popular vote	9,770	7,671
Percentage	53.0%	46.6%
Swing	▼2.4%	▼2.8%
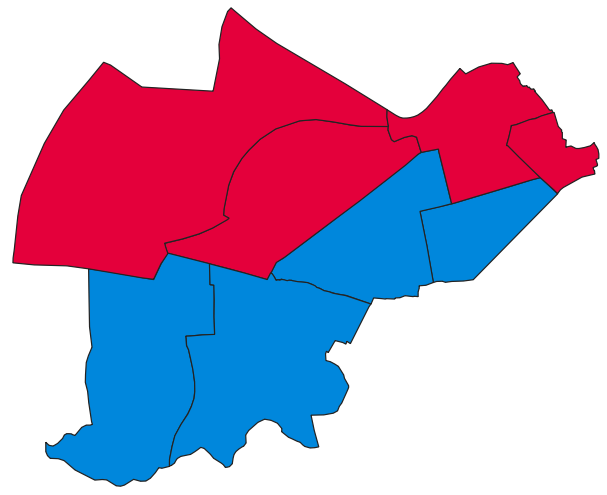
- Map of results of 1958 election
Leader of the Council before election
Conservative
Leader of the Council after election
Conservative

Elections to Stretford Council were held on Thursday, 8 May 1958. One third of the councillors were up for election, with each successful candidate to serve a three-year term of office. The Conservative Party retained overall control of the council.

== Election result ==
Party	Votes		Seats			Full Council	
Conservative Party	8,726 (53.0%)	▲2.4	4 (50.0%)	4 / 8	▼2	18 (56.3%)	18 / 32
Labour Party	7,671 (46.6%)	▼2.8	4 (50.0%)	4 / 8	▲2	14 (43.7%)	14 / 32
Communist Party	64 (0.4%)	N/A	0 (0.0%)	0 / 8	N/A	0 (0.0%)	0 / 32

=== Full council ===
↓
14	18

=== Aldermen ===
↓
2	6

=== Councillors ===
↓
12	12

== Ward results ==
=== Clifford ===
Clifford
Party	Candidate	Votes	%	±%
Labour	E. Fawcett	1,027	60.2	+2.5
Conservative	C. R. Hamilton	680	39.8	−2.5
Majority		347	20.4	+5.0
Turnout		1,707		
Labour gain from Conservative		Swing		

=== Cornbrook ===
Cornbrook
Party	Candidate	Votes	%	±%
Labour	E. Cavanagh	965	54.1	−3.2
Conservative	H. H. Black	820	45.9	+3.2
Majority		145	8.2	−6.4
Turnout		1,785		
Labour gain from Conservative		Swing		

=== Longford ===
Longford
Party	Candidate	Votes	%	±%
Conservative	L. W. Hall*	1,593	62.5	+7.5
Labour	G. Marland	956	37.5	−7.5
Majority		637	25.0	+15.0
Turnout		2,549		
Conservative hold		Swing		

=== Park ===
Park
Party	Candidate	Votes	%	±%
Labour	F. P. Fay*	1,352	57.4	−6.9
Conservative	T. Smith	941	39.9	+4.2
Communist	V. Eddisford	64	2.7	N/A
Majority		411	17.5	−11.1
Turnout		2,357		
Labour hold		Swing		

=== Stretford ===
Stretford
Party	Candidate	Votes	%	±%
Conservative	T. Davies*	1,480	64.2	+1.8
Labour	W. Malone	826	35.8	−1.8
Majority		654	28.4	+3.6
Turnout		2,306		
Conservative hold		Swing		

=== Talbot North ===
Talbot North
Party	Candidate	Votes	%	±%
Labour	E. Reid*	1,475	67.6	+5.8
Conservative	A. Holderness	706	32.4	−5.8
Majority		769	35.2	+11.6
Turnout		2,181		
Labour hold		Swing		

=== Talbot South ===
Talbot South
Party	Candidate	Votes	%	±%
Conservative	B. Davison*	1,273	65.5	+5.7
Labour	E. Allcock	671	34.5	−5.7
Majority		602	31.0	+11.4
Turnout		1,944		
Conservative hold		Swing		

=== Trafford ===
Trafford
Party	Candidate	Votes	%	±%
Conservative	H. H. Eckersall*	1,233	75.6	+6.5
Labour	A. Hillson	399	24.4	−6.5
Majority		834	51.2	+13.0
Turnout		1,632		
Conservative hold		Swing		
