= 1960 Stretford Municipal Borough Council election =

UK local government election

- 12 May 1960

8 of 32 seats to Stretford Municipal Borough Council 16 seats needed for a majority
	First party	Second party
Party	Conservative	Labour
Last election	4 seats, 51.6%	4 seats, 43.3%
Seats before	18	14
Seats won	4	4
Seats after	18	14
Seat change	Steady	Steady
Popular vote	8,845	6,862
Percentage	52.4%	40.7%
Swing	▲0.8%	▼2.6%
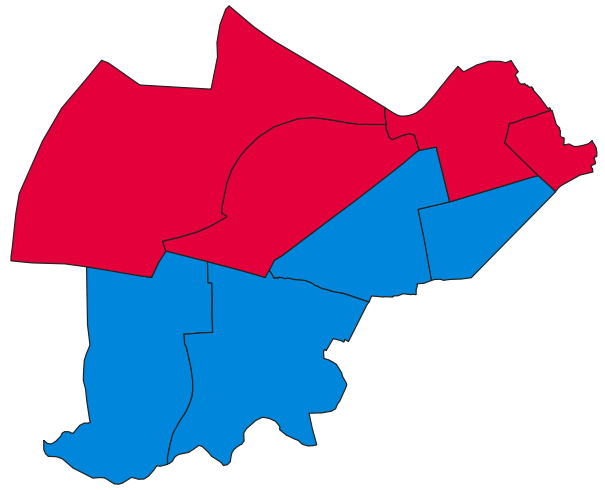
- Map of results of 1960 election
Leader of the Council before election
Conservative
Leader of the Council after election
Conservative

Elections to Stretford Council were held on Thursday, 12 May 1960. One third of the councillors were up for election, with each successful candidate to serve a three-year term of office. The Conservative Party retained overall control of the council.

== Election result ==
Party	Votes		Seats			Full Council	
Conservative Party	8,845 (52.4%)	▲0.8	4 (50.0%)	4 / 8	Steady	18 (56.3%)	18 / 32
Labour Party	6,862 (40.7%)	▼2.6	4 (50.0%)	4 / 8	Steady	14 (43.7%)	14 / 32
Liberal Party	1,103 (6.5%)	▲1.7	0 (0.0%)	0 / 8	Steady	0 (0.0%)	0 / 32
Communist Party	58 (0.3%)	Steady	0 (0.0%)	0 / 8	Steady	0 (0.0%)	0 / 32

=== Full council ===
↓
14	18

=== Aldermen ===
↓
2	6

=== Councillors ===
↓
12	12

== Ward results ==
=== Clifford ===
Clifford
Party	Candidate	Votes	%	±%
Labour	E. Bott*	825	55.8	−4.7
Conservative	F. Lawson	654	44.2	+4.7
Majority		171	11.6	−9.4
Turnout		1,479		
Labour hold		Swing		

=== Cornbrook ===
Cornbrook
Party	Candidate	Votes	%	±%
Labour	T. Bancroft*	1,005	55.5	+0.7
Conservative	J. E. Schofield	807	44.5	−0.7
Majority		198	11.0	+1.4
Turnout		1,812		
Labour hold		Swing		

=== Longford ===
Longford
Party	Candidate	Votes	%	±%
Conservative	W. Matthews*	1,283	51.4	−12.2
Labour	L. Johnson	728	29.1	−7.3
Liberal	V. Dearden	487	19.5	N/A
Majority		555	22.3	−4.9
Turnout		2,498		
Conservative hold		Swing		

=== Park ===
Park
Party	Candidate	Votes	%	±%
Labour	A. Kirkbright*	1,206	49.3	−7.5
Conservative	S. Till	1,184	48.4	+7.2
Communist	V. Eddisford	58	2.3	+0.3
Majority		22	0.9	−14.7
Turnout		2,448		
Labour hold		Swing		

=== Stretford ===
Stretford
Party	Candidate	Votes	%	±%
Conservative	J. P. Morrison*	1,354	53.8	+6.0
Liberal	M. Nuttall	616	24.5	−4.7
Labour	P. Barton	547	21.7	−1.3
Majority		738	29.3	+10.7
Turnout		2,517		
Conservative hold		Swing		

=== Talbot North ===
Talbot North
Party	Candidate	Votes	%	±%
Labour	G. Marland	1,489	56.7	−3.3
Conservative	J. L. Rigney	1,137	43.3	+3.3
Majority		352	13.4	−6.6
Turnout		2,626		
Labour hold		Swing		

=== Talbot South ===
Talbot South
Party	Candidate	Votes	%	±%
Conservative	A. W. Davison*	1,196	63.2	+1.1
Labour	H. Tong	695	36.8	−1.1
Majority		501	26.4	+2.2
Turnout		1,891		
Conservative hold		Swing		

=== Trafford ===
Trafford
Party	Candidate	Votes	%	±%
Conservative	O. Chandler*	1,230	77.0	−1.2
Labour	R. W. Flatters	367	23.0	+1.2
Majority		864	54.0	−2.4
Turnout		1,597		
Conservative hold		Swing		
