= 1966 Stretford Municipal Borough Council election =

UK local government election

- 12 May 1966

8 of 32 seats to Stretford Municipal Borough Council 16 seats needed for a majority
	First party	Second party
Party	Labour	Conservative
Last election	4 seats, 41.8%	4 seats, 44.6%
Seats before	17	15
Seats won	5	3
Seats after	18	14
Seat change	▲1	▼1
Popular vote	6,883	7,042
Percentage	43.7%	44.7%
Swing	▲1.9%	▲0.1%
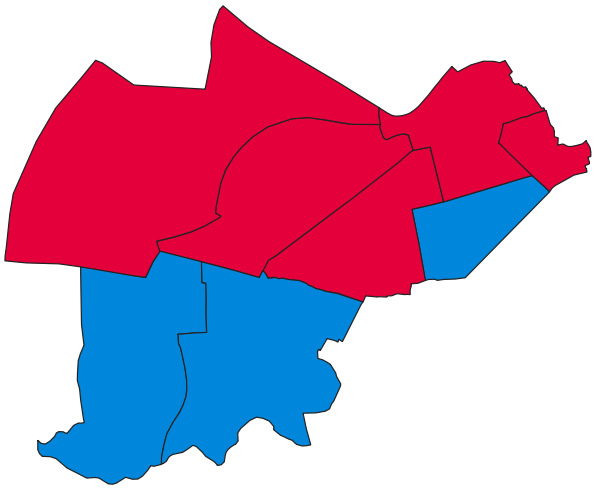
- Map of results of 1966 election
Leader of the Council before election
Labour
Leader of the Council after election
Labour

Elections to Stretford Council were held on Thursday, 12 May 1966. One third of the councillors were up for election, with each successful candidate to serve a three-year term of office. The Labour Party retained overall control.

== Election result ==
Party	Votes		Seats			Full Council	
Labour Party	6,883 (43.7%)	▲1.9	5 (62.5%)	5 / 8	▲1	18 (56.3%)	18 / 32
Conservative Party	7,042 (44.7%)	▲0.1	3 (37.5%)	3 / 8	▼1	14 (43.7%)	14 / 32
Liberal Party	1,758 (11.2%)	▲0.6	0 (0.0%)	0 / 8	Steady	0 (0.0%)	0 / 32
Communist Party	60 (0.4%)	Steady	0 (0.0%)	0 / 8	Steady	0 (0.0%)	0 / 32

=== Full council ===
↓
18	14

=== Aldermen ===
↓
4	4

=== Councillors ===
↓
14	10

== Ward results ==
=== Clifford ===
Clifford
Party	Candidate	Votes	%	±%
Labour	E. Bott*	694	57.6	−1.0
Conservative	J. Schofield	435	36.1	−5.3
Liberal	H. Brunton	75	6.3	N/A
Majority		259	21.5	+4.3
Turnout		1,204		
Labour hold		Swing		

=== Cornbrook ===
Cornbrook
Party	Candidate	Votes	%	±%
Labour	J. Somerville*	794	53.5	+12.3
Conservative	J. Healy	511	34.4	−8.8
Liberal	C. Christian	179	12.1	−3.5
Majority		283	19.1	
Turnout		1,484		
Labour hold		Swing		

=== Longford ===
Longford
Party	Candidate	Votes	%	±%
Conservative	W. Matthews*	1,154	52.3	−11.6
Labour	N. Wrigley	831	37.7	+1.6
Liberal	B. Cohen	222	10.0	N/A
Majority		323	14.6	−13.2
Turnout		2,207		
Conservative hold		Swing		

=== Park ===
Park
Party	Candidate	Votes	%	±%
Labour	A. Kirkbright*	1,197	62.9	+6.8
Conservative	B. Boulton	647	34.0	−7.0
Communist	A. Jarratt	60	3.1	+0.2
Majority		550	28.9	+13.8
Turnout		1,904		
Labour hold		Swing		

=== Stretford ===
Stretford
Party	Candidate	Votes	%	±%
Conservative	M. Hindley*	1,531	62.4	−5.8
Labour	V. Cooling	714	29.1	−2.7
Liberal	N. Roberts	208	8.5	N/A
Majority		817	33.3	−3.1
Turnout		2,453		
Conservative hold		Swing		

=== Talbot North ===
Talbot North
Party	Candidate	Votes	%	±%
Labour	G. Marland*	1,252	60.7	−1.8
Conservative	R. Gregory	812	39.3	N/A
Majority		440	21.4	−3.6
Turnout		2,064		
Labour hold		Swing		

=== Talbot South ===
Talbot South
Party	Candidate	Votes	%	±%
Labour	D. F. Sullivan	966	45.2	+3.0
Conservative	C. Warbrick*	934	43.7	+4.3
Liberal	J. M. Bainbridge	237	11.1	N/A
Majority		32	1.5	−1.3
Turnout		2,137		
Labour gain from Conservative		Swing		

=== Trafford ===
Trafford
Party	Candidate	Votes	%	±%
Conservative	O. Chandler*	1,018	44.5	−4.7
Liberal	R. W. Corke	837	36.6	+5.1
Labour	I. Clough	435	18.9	−0.4
Majority		181	7.9	−9.8
Turnout		2,290		
Conservative hold		Swing		
