= 1967 Stretford Municipal Borough Council election =

UK local government election

- 11 May 1967

8 of 32 seats to Stretford Municipal Borough Council 16 seats needed for a majority
	First party	Second party
Party	Conservative	Labour
Last election	3 seats, 44.7%	5 seats, 43.7%
Seats before	14	18
Seats won	6	2
Seats after	17	15
Seat change	▲3	▼3
Popular vote	7,850	5,414
Percentage	53.9%	37.2%
Swing	▲9.2%	▼6.5%
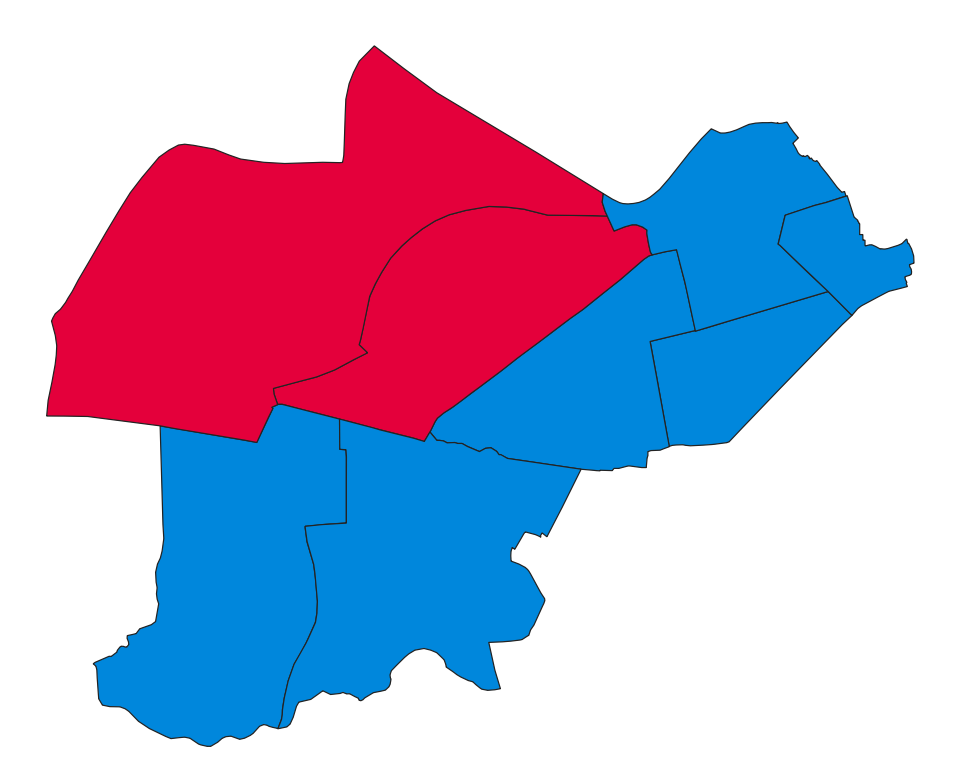
- Map of results of 1967 election
Leader of the Council before election
Labour
Leader of the Council after election
Conservative

Elections to Stretford Council were held on Thursday, 11 May 1967. One third of the councillors were up for election, with each successful candidate to serve a three-year term of office. The Conservative Party gained overall control of the council from the Labour Party.

== Election result ==
Party	Votes		Seats			Full Council	
Conservative Party	7,850 (53.9%)	▲9.2	6 (75.0%)	6 / 8	▲3	17 (53.1%)	17 / 32
Labour Party	5,414 (37.2%)	▼6.5	2 (25.0%)	2 / 8	▼3	15 (46.9%)	15 / 32
Liberal Party	1,177 (8.1%)	▼3.1	0 (0.0%)	0 / 8	Steady	0 (0.0%)	0 / 32
Communist Party	89 (0.6%)	▲0.2	0 (0.0%)	0 / 8	Steady	0 (0.0%)	0 / 32
Independent	36 (0.2%)	N/A	0 (0.0%)	0 / 8	N/A	0 (0.0%)	0 / 32

=== Full council ===
↓
15	17

=== Aldermen ===
↓
4	4

=== Councillors ===
↓
11	13

== Ward results ==
=== Clifford ===
Clifford
Party	Candidate	Votes	%	±%
Conservative	D. H. Shawcross	544	51.6	+15.5
Labour	E. Fawcett*	510	48.4	−9.2
Majority		34	3.2	
Turnout		1,054		
Conservative gain from Labour		Swing		

=== Cornbrook ===
Cornbrook
Party	Candidate	Votes	%	±%
Conservative	F. Green	570	48.8	+14.4
Labour	E. Cavanagh*	456	39.1	−14.4
Liberal	C. Christian	141	12.1	0
Majority		114	9.7	
Turnout		1,167		
Conservative gain from Labour		Swing		

=== Longford ===
Longford
Party	Candidate	Votes	%	±%
Conservative	D. Homer*	1,288	61.1	+8.8
Labour	O. Raby	658	31.2	−6.5
Liberal	B. Cohen	162	7.7	−2.3
Majority		630	29.9	+15.3
Turnout		2,108		
Conservative hold		Swing		

=== Park ===
Park
Party	Candidate	Votes	%	±%
Labour	C. Shea	991	50.5	−12.4
Conservative	M. A. M. Evans	881	44.9	+10.9
Communist	A. Jarratt	89	4.6	+1.5
Majority		110	5.6	−23.3
Turnout		1,961		
Labour hold		Swing		

=== Stretford ===
Stretford
Party	Candidate	Votes	%	±%
Conservative	R. Moores*	1,566	65.7	+3.3
Labour	I. Clough	521	21.9	−7.2
Liberal	R. W. Corke	296	12.4	+3.9
Majority		1,045	43.8	+10.5
Turnout		2,383		
Conservative hold		Swing		

=== Talbot North ===
Talbot North
Party	Candidate	Votes	%	±%
Labour	H. Cronshaw*	1,119	52.6	−8.1
Conservative	R. Gregory	1,010	47.4	+8.1
Majority		109	5.2	−16.2
Turnout		2,129		
Labour hold		Swing		

=== Talbot South ===
Talbot South
Party	Candidate	Votes	%	±%
Conservative	J. Schofield	1,086	53.6	+9.9
Labour	D. Stewart*	706	34.9	−10.3
Liberal	R. Burke	197	9.7	−1.4
Independent	T. Harthill	36	1.8	N/A
Majority		380	18.7	
Turnout		2,025		
Conservative gain from Labour		Swing		

=== Trafford ===
Trafford
Party	Candidate	Votes	%	±%
Conservative	C. Hamilton*	905	52.0	+7.5
Labour	N. Wrigley	453	26.0	+7.1
Liberal	J. M. Bainbridge	381	22.0	−14.6
Majority		452	26.0	+18.1
Turnout		1,739		
Conservative hold		Swing		
