= 1969 Stretford Municipal Borough Council election =

UK local government election

- 8 May 1969

8 of 32 seats to Stretford Municipal Borough Council 16 seats needed for a majority
	First party	Second party
Party	Conservative	Labour
Last election	7 seats, 63.6%	1 seat, 31.3%
Seats before	20	12
Seats won	8	0
Seats after	25	7
Seat change	▲5	▼5
Popular vote	8,529	4,692
Percentage	60.0%	33.0%
Swing	▼3.6%	▲1.7%
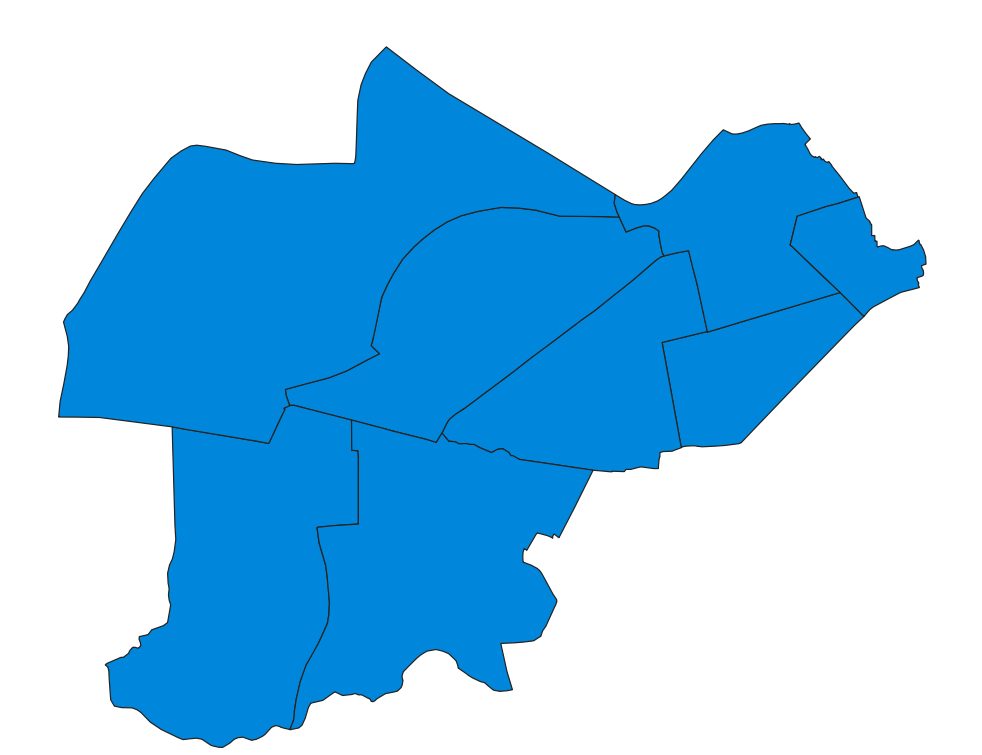
- Map of results of 19689 election
Leader of the Council before election
Conservative
Leader of the Council after election
Conservative

Elections to Stretford Council were held on Thursday, 9 May 1968. One third of the councillors were up for election, with each successful candidate to serve a three-year term of office. The Conservative Party retained overall control of the council.

== Election result ==
Party	Votes		Seats			Full Council	
Conservative Party	8,529 (60.0%)	▼3.6	8 (100.0%)	8 / 8	▲5	25 (78.9%)	25 / 32
Labour Party	4,692 (33.0%)	▲1.7	0 (0.0%)	0 / 8	▼5	7 (21.9%)	7 / 32
Independent	541 (3.8%)	N/A	0 (0.0%)	0 / 8	N/A	0 (0.0%)	0 / 32
Liberal Party	381 (2.7%)	▼2.0	0 (0.0%)	0 / 8	Steady	0 (0.0%)	0 / 32
Communist Party	81 (0.6%)	▲0.2	0 (0.0%)	0 / 8	Steady	0 (0.0%)	0 / 32

=== Full council ===
↓
7	25

=== Aldermen ===
↓
4	4

=== Councillors ===
↓
3	21

== Ward results ==
=== Clifford ===
Clifford
Party	Candidate	Votes	%	±%
Conservative	A. Gow	649	56.2	+11.9
Labour	E. Bott*	506	43.8	−11.9
Majority		143	12.4	+1.0
Turnout		1,155		
Conservative gain from Labour		Swing		

=== Cornbrook ===
Cornbrook
Party	Candidate	Votes	%	±%
Conservative	R. W. Corke	589	59.3	−1.3
Labour	H. Davies	404	40.7	+1.3
Majority		185	18.6	−2.6
Turnout		993		
Conservative gain from Labour		Swing		

=== Longford ===
Longford
Party	Candidate	Votes	%	±%
Conservative	W. Matthews*	1,274	68.2	−5.2
Labour	A. Bates	595	31.8	+5.2
Majority		679	36.4	−10.4
Turnout		1,869		
Conservative hold		Swing		

=== Park ===
Park
Party	Candidate	Votes	%	±%
Conservative	S. Watkinson	1,118	54.7	−3.6
Labour	A. Kirkbright*	846	41.4	+11.0
Communist	A. Jarratt	81	3.9	+0.9
Majority		272	13.3	−14.6
Turnout		2,045		
Conservative gain from Labour		Swing		

=== Stretford ===
Stretford
Party	Candidate	Votes	%	±%
Conservative	M. Hindley*	1,580	61.5	−14.8
Independent	H. Walker	541	21.1	N/A
Labour	K. Silcock	303	11.8	−2.6
Liberal	R. J. Allan	144	5.6	−3.7
Majority		1,039	40.4	−21.5
Turnout		2,568		
Conservative hold		Swing		

=== Talbot North ===
Talbot North
Party	Candidate	Votes	%	±%
Conservative	N. Quinn	1,076	50.6	−7.5
Labour	G. Marland*	1,055	49.5	+7.5
Majority		21	1.0	−15.0
Turnout		2,131		
Conservative gain from Labour		Swing		

=== Talbot South ===
Talbot South
Party	Candidate	Votes	%	±%
Conservative	E. J. Kelson	1,189	62.4	+4.0
Labour	D. F. Sullivan*	716	37.6	+1.0
Majority		473	24.8	+3.0
Turnout		1,905		
Conservative gain from Labour		Swing		

=== Trafford ===
Trafford
Party	Candidate	Votes	%	±%
Conservative	C. Warbrick*	1,054	67.7	−2.6
Labour	A. S. Clough	267	17.1	+0.1
Liberal	C. Christian	237	15.2	+2.5
Majority		787	50.6	−2.7
Turnout		1,558		
Conservative hold		Swing		
