= 1957 Stretford Municipal Borough Council election =

UK local government election

- 9 May 1957

8 of 32 seats to Stretford Municipal Borough Council 16 seats needed for a majority
	First party	Second party
Party	Conservative	Labour
Last election	4 seats, 51.5%	4 seats, 48.5%
Seats before	21	11
Seats won	4	4
Seats after	20	12
Seat change	▼1	▲1
Popular vote	9,770	9,528
Percentage	50.6%	49.4%
Swing	▼0.9%	▲0.9%
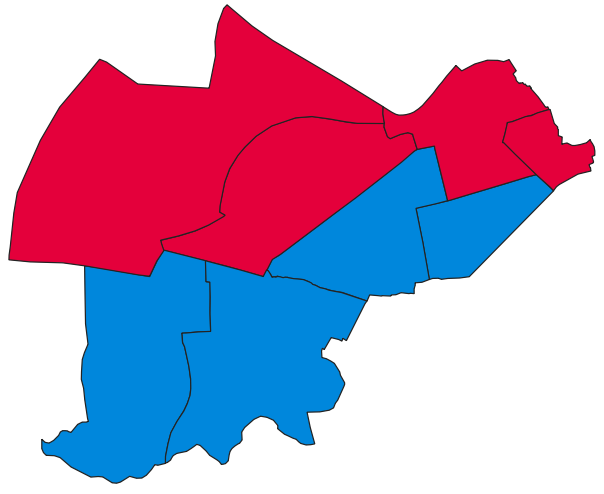
- Map of results of 1957 election
Leader of the Council before election
Conservative
Leader of the Council after election
Conservative

Elections to Stretford Council were held on Thursday, 9 May 1957. One third of the councillors were up for election, with each successful candidate to serve a three-year term of office. The Conservative Party retained overall control of the council.

== Election result ==
Party	Votes		Seats			Full Council	
Conservative Party	9,770 (50.6%)	▼0.9	4 (50.0%)	4 / 8	▼1	20 (62.5%)	20 / 32
Labour Party	9,528 (49.4%)	▲0.9	4 (50.0%)	4 / 8	▲1	12 (37.5%)	12 / 32

=== Full council ===
↓
12	20

=== Aldermen ===
↓
2	6

=== Councillors ===
↓
10	14

== Ward results ==
=== Clifford ===
Clifford
Party	Candidate	Votes	%	±%
Labour	E. Bott	1,200	57.7	+5.6
Conservative	F. Lawson	878	42.3	−5.6
Majority		322	15.4	+11.2
Turnout		2,078		
Labour hold		Swing		

=== Cornbrook ===
Cornbrook
Party	Candidate	Votes	%	±%
Labour	I. Bancroft	1,297	57.3	+2.9
Conservative	J. M. Maxted*	966	42.7	−2.9
Majority		331	14.6	+5.8
Turnout		2,263		
Labour gain from Conservative		Swing		

=== Longford ===
Longford
Party	Candidate	Votes	%	±%
Conservative	W. Matthews*	1,548	55.0	−1.8
Labour	F. P. Fay	1,268	45.0	+1.8
Majority		280	10.0	−3.6
Turnout		2,816		
Conservative hold		Swing		

=== Park ===
Park
Party	Candidate	Votes	%	±%
Labour	A. Kirkbright*	1,494	64.3	−4.9
Conservative	G. Beswick	830	35.7	+4.9
Majority		664	28.6	−9.8
Turnout		2,324		
Labour hold		Swing		

=== Stretford ===
Stretford
Party	Candidate	Votes	%	±%
Conservative	J. P. Morrison*	1,635	62.4	−1.5
Labour	W. Malone	986	37.6	+1.5
Majority		649	24.8	−3.9
Turnout		2,621		
Conservative hold		Swing		

=== Talbot North ===
Talbot North
Party	Candidate	Votes	%	±%
Labour	O. S. Raby*	1,684	61.8	+1.1
Conservative	A. Holderness	1,043	38.2	−1.1
Majority		641	23.6	+2.2
Turnout		2,727		
Labour hold		Swing		

=== Talbot South ===
Talbot South
Party	Candidate	Votes	%	±%
Conservative	A. W. Davison*	1,388	59.8	+1.7
Labour	G. Marland	935	40.2	−1.7
Majority		453	19.6	+3.4
Turnout		2,323		
Conservative hold		Swing		

=== Trafford ===
Trafford
Party	Candidate	Votes	%	±%
Conservative	O. Chandler*	1,482	69.1	−6.1
Labour	E. Fawcett	664	30.9	+6.1
Majority		818	38.2	−12.2
Turnout		2,146		
Conservative hold		Swing		
