= 1963 Stretford Municipal Borough Council election =

UK local government election

- 9 May 1963

8 of 32 seats to Stretford Municipal Borough Council 16 seats needed for a majority
	First party	Second party	Third party
Party	Labour	Conservative	Liberal
Last election	4 seats, 45.4%	2 seats, 39.0%	2 seats, 15.3%
Seats before	15	15	2
Seats won	4	4	0
Seats after	15	15	2
Seat change	Steady	Steady	Steady
Popular vote	8,628	6,687	3,916
Percentage	44.7%	34.7%	20.3%
Swing	▼0.7%	▼4.3%	▲5.0%
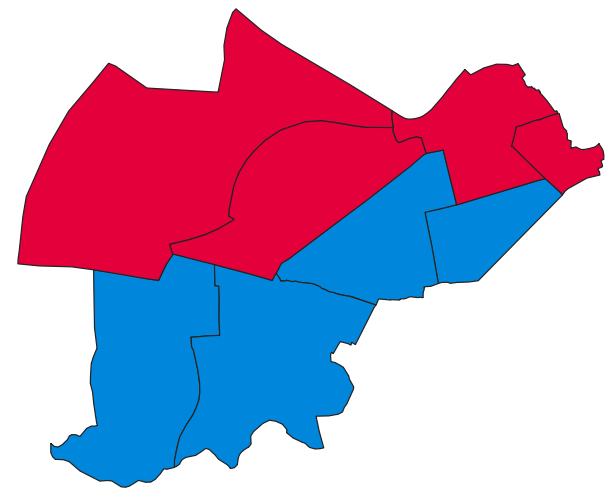
- Map of results of 1963 election
Leader of the Council before election
No overall control
Leader of the Council after election
No overall control

Elections to Stretford Council were held on Thursday, 9 May 1963. One third of the councillors were up for election, with each successful candidate to serve a three-year term of office. The council remained under no overall control.

== Election result ==
Party	Votes		Seats			Full Council	
Labour Party	8,628 (44.7%)	▼0.7	4 (50.0%)	4 / 8	Steady	15 (46.9%)	15 / 32
Conservative Party	6,687 (34.7%)	▼4.3	4 (50.0%)	4 / 8	Steady	15 (46.9%)	15 / 32
Liberal Party	3,916 (20.3%)	▲5.0	0 (0.0%)	0 / 8	Steady	2 (6.3%)	2 / 32
Communist Party	65 (0.3%)	▼0.1	0 (0.0%)	0 / 8	Steady	0 (0.0%)	0 / 32

=== Full council ===
↓
15	2	15

=== Aldermen ===
↓
3	5

=== Councillors ===
↓
12	2	10

== Ward results ==
=== Clifford ===
Clifford
Party	Candidate	Votes	%	±%
Labour	E. Bott*	948	71.2	+4.6
Conservative	E. Earle	383	28.8	−4.6
Majority		565	42.4	+9.2
Turnout		1,331		
Labour hold		Swing		

=== Cornbrook ===
Cornbrook
Party	Candidate	Votes	%	±%
Labour	T. Bancroft*	1,052	54.4	−7.1
Liberal	J. Brown	487	25.2	N/A
Conservative	A. MacGregor	394	20.4	−18.1
Majority		565	29.2	+6.2
Turnout		1,933		
Labour hold		Swing		

=== Longford ===
Longford
Party	Candidate	Votes	%	±%
Conservative	W. Matthews*	1,100	41.2	−0.3
Labour	J. Somerville	972	36.4	+5.4
Liberal	W. Baker	599	22.4	−5.0
Majority		128	4.8	−5.8
Turnout		2,671		
Conservative hold		Swing		

=== Park ===
Park
Party	Candidate	Votes	%	±%
Labour	A. Kirkbright*	1,636	63.6	−3.7
Conservative	S. Till	867	33.8	+3.5
Communist	V. Eddisford	65	2.6	+0.2
Majority		769	29.8	−7.2
Turnout		2,568		
Labour hold		Swing		

=== Stretford ===
Stretford
Party	Candidate	Votes	%	±%
Conservative	M. Hindley	1,235	41.6	+7.0
Liberal	G. Slinger	962	32.4	−9.0
Labour	V. Cooling	773	26.0	+2.0
Majority		273	9.2	
Turnout		2,970		
Conservative hold		Swing		

=== Talbot North ===
Talbot North
Party	Candidate	Votes	%	±%
Labour	G. Marland*	1,638	59.6	+2.0
Conservative	A. Price	590	21.5	−20.9
Liberal	R. Revell	521	18.9	N/A
Majority		1,048	38.1	+22.9
Turnout		2,749		
Labour hold		Swing		

=== Talbot South ===
Talbot South
Party	Candidate	Votes	%	±%
Conservative	N. Davis	1,092	41.2	−12.2
Labour	A. S. Clough	1,042	39.3	−7.3
Liberal	C. Conlin	516	19.5	N/A
Majority		50	1.9	−4.9
Turnout		2,650		
Conservative hold		Swing		

=== Trafford ===
Trafford
Party	Candidate	Votes	%	±%
Conservative	O. Chandler*	1,026	42.3	+2.7
Liberal	J. Bainbridge	831	34.3	−8.9
Labour	A. Drabble	567	23.4	+6.2
Majority		195	8.0	
Turnout		2,424		
Conservative hold		Swing		
