= 1970 Stretford Municipal Borough Council election =

UK local government election

- 7 May 1970

8 of 32 seats to Stretford Municipal Borough Council 16 seats needed for a majority
| | First party | Second party |
|---|---|---|
| Party | Conservative | Labour |
| Last election | 8 seats, 60.0% | 0 seats, 33.0% |
| Seats before | 25 | 7 |
| Seats won | 4 | 4 |
| Seats after | 23 | 9 |
| Seat change | ▼2 | ▲2 |
| Popular vote | 6,742 | 6,341 |
| Percentage | 49.5% | 46.5% |
| Swing | ▼10.5% | ▲13.5% |
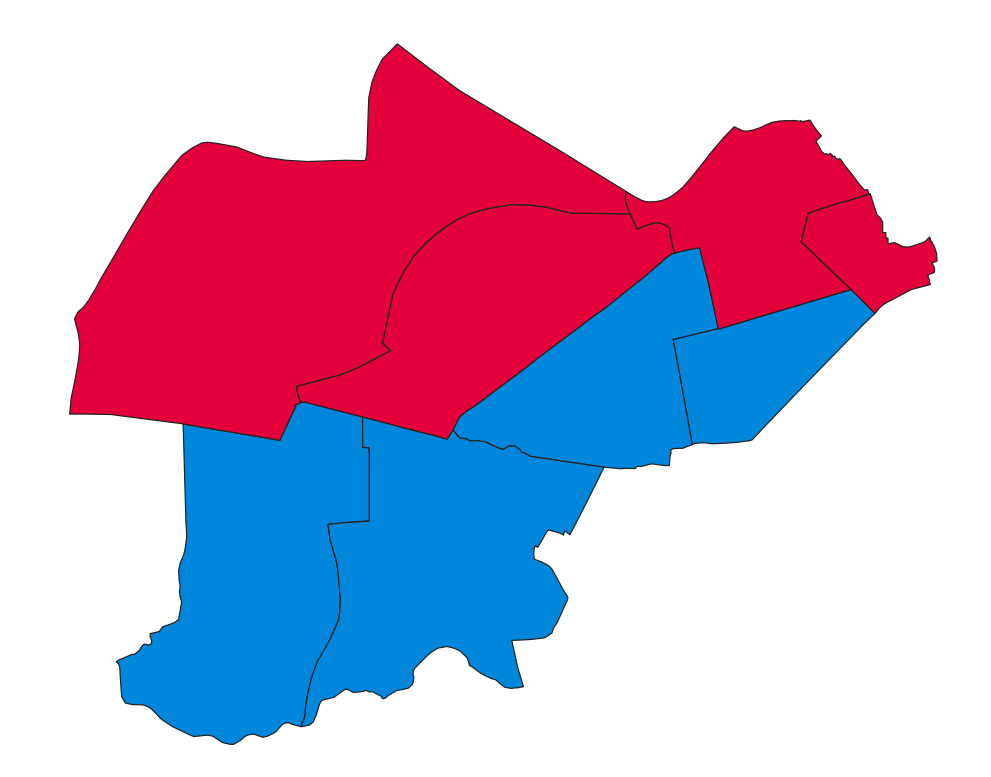
- Map of results of 1970 election
Leader of the Council before election
Conservative
Leader of the Council after election
Conservative

Elections to Stretford Council were held on Thursday, 7 May 1970. One third of the councillors were up for election, with each successful candidate to serve a three-year term of office. The Conservative Party retained overall control of the council.

== Election result ==
| Party | Votes | | Seats | | | Full Council | |
| Conservative Party | 6,742 (49.5%) | ▼10.5 | 4 (50.0%) | 4 / 8 | ▼2 | 23 (71.9%) | 23 / 32 |
| Labour Party | 6,341 (46.5%) | ▲13.5 | 4 (50.0%) | 4 / 8 | ▲2 | 9 (28.1%) | 9 / 32 |
| Independent | 505 (3.7%) | ▼0.1 | 0 (0.0%) | 0 / 8 | N/A | 0 (0.0%) | 0 / 32 |
| Communist Party | 43 (0.3%) | ▼0.3 | 0 (0.0%) | 0 / 8 | Steady | 0 (0.0%) | 0 / 32 |

=== Full council ===
↓
| 9 | 23 |

=== Aldermen ===
↓
| 4 | 4 |

=== Councillors ===
↓
| 5 | 19 |

== Ward results ==
=== Clifford ===
Clifford
| Party | Candidate | Votes | % | ±% |
|---|---|---|---|---|
| Labour | H. Davies | 571 | 54.7 | +10.9 |
| Conservative | D. H. Shawcross | 472 | 45.3 | −10.9 |
| Majority | | 99 | 9.4 | |
| Turnout | | 1,043 | | |
| Labour gain from Conservative | | Swing | | |

=== Cornbrook ===
Cornbrook
| Party | Candidate | Votes | % | ±% |
|---|---|---|---|---|
| Labour | D. F. Sullivan | 690 | 55.3 | +14.6 |
| Conservative | H. Sorenson | 557 | 44.7 | −14.6 |
| Majority | | 133 | 10.6 | |
| Turnout | | 1,247 | | |
| Labour gain from Conservative | | Swing | | |

=== Longford ===
Longford
| Party | Candidate | Votes | % | ±% |
|---|---|---|---|---|
| Conservative | D. W. Homer* | 1,150 | 62.2 | −6.0 |
| Labour | J. Bailey | 699 | 37.8 | +6.0 |
| Majority | | 451 | 24.4 | −12.0 |
| Turnout | | 1,849 | | |
| Conservative hold | | Swing | | |

=== Park ===
Park
| Party | Candidate | Votes | % | ±% |
|---|---|---|---|---|
| Labour | C. R. Shea* | 1,165 | 58.5 | +17.1 |
| Conservative | H. D. Pugh | 783 | 39.3 | −15.4 |
| Communist | A. Jarratt | 43 | 2.2 | −1.7 |
| Majority | | 382 | 19.2 | |
| Turnout | | 1,991 | | |
| Labour hold | | Swing | | |

=== Stretford ===
Stretford
| Party | Candidate | Votes | % | ±% |
|---|---|---|---|---|
| Conservative | R. Moores* | 1,138 | 52.0 | −9.5 |
| Labour | K. Silcock | 545 | 24.9 | +13.1 |
| Independent | H. Walker | 505 | 23.1 | +2.0 |
| Majority | | 593 | 27.1 | −13.3 |
| Turnout | | 2,188 | | |
| Conservative hold | | Swing | | |

=== Talbot North ===
Talbot North
| Party | Candidate | Votes | % | ±% |
|---|---|---|---|---|
| Labour | H. C. Cronshaw* | 1,399 | 63.5 | +14.0 |
| Conservative | R. Harwood | 805 | 36.5 | −14.0 |
| Majority | | 594 | 27.0 | |
| Turnout | | 2,204 | | |
| Labour hold | | Swing | | |

=== Talbot South ===
Talbot South
| Party | Candidate | Votes | % | ±% |
|---|---|---|---|---|
| Conservative | J. A. Schofield* | 950 | 54.8 | −7.6 |
| Labour | D. Stewart | 782 | 45.2 | +7.6 |
| Majority | | 168 | 9.6 | −15.2 |
| Turnout | | 1,732 | | |
| Conservative hold | | Swing | | |

=== Trafford ===
Trafford
| Party | Candidate | Votes | % | ±% |
|---|---|---|---|---|
| Conservative | C. R. Hamilton* | 887 | 64.4 | −3.3 |
| Labour | A. Clough | 490 | 35.6 | +18.5 |
| Majority | | 397 | 28.8 | −21.8 |
| Turnout | | 1,377 | | |
| Conservative hold | | Swing | | |
