= 1967 Neath Rural District Council election =

1967 Welsh local government election

An election to the Neath Rural District Council in West Glamorgan, Wales was held on 11 May 1967. It was preceded by the 1964 election, and followed by the 1970 election.

== Overview of the results ==
During the previous year, the Labour Party had suffered many setbacks in south Wales, including the loss of a parliamentary seat to Plaid Cymru. At the 1967 local elections, the party lost ground in much of south Wales but the Neath Rural District was an exception and there was little change.

== Candidates ==
Once again, the profile of candidates was similar to three years previously with a number of long-serving Labour councillors returned unopposed.

== Outcome ==
There were a few changes but Labour retained a comfortable majority.

== Ward results ==
=== Baglan Higher (one seat) ===
Baglan Higher 1967
Party	Candidate	Votes	%	±%
Labour	Lilian Jones*	148		
Independent	Edward Daniel Eric Brace	72		
Labour hold		Swing		

=== Blaengwrach (two seats) ===
Blaengwrach 1967
Party	Candidate	Votes	%	±%
Independent	Clifford Graham Jones*	Unopposed		
Independent	David Emanuel Thomas*	Unopposed		
Independent hold		Swing		
Independent hold		Swing		

=== Blaenrhonddan, Bryncoch Ward (one seat) ===
Blaenrhonddan, Bryncoch Ward 1967
Party	Candidate	Votes	%	±%
Labour	Royston Jones*	1,063		
Plaid Cymru	David Brian James	634		
Labour hold		Swing		

=== Blaenrhonddan, Cadoxton Ward (one seat) ===
Blaenrhonddan, Cadoxton Ward 1967
Party	Candidate	Votes	%	±%
Labour	David John Davies*	Unopposed		
Labour hold		Swing		

=== Blaenrhonddan, Cilfrew Ward (one seat) ===
Blaenrhonddan, Cilfrew Ward 1967
Party	Candidate	Votes	%	±%
Labour	John Evans*	184		
Independent	Thomas Edward Rees	115		
Independent	Brian Parry Wolfe	110		
Labour hold		Swing		

=== Clyne (one seats) ===
Clyne 1967
Party	Candidate	Votes	%	±%
Labour	Merfyn Jeffreys*	Unopposed		
Labour hold		Swing		

=== Coedffranc, South Ward (one seat) ===
Coedffranc, South Ward 1967
Party	Candidate	Votes	%	±%
Labour	Thomas L. Thomas*	603		
Independent	Ronald James	252		
Labour hold		Swing		

=== Coedffranc, East Central (one seat) ===
Coedffranc East Central 1967
Party	Candidate	Votes	%	±%
Independent	Martin Thomas*	516		
Labour	Ronald George Day	268		
Independent hold		Swing		

=== Coedffranc North Ward (one seat) ===
Coedffranc North Ward 1967
Party	Candidate	Votes	%	±%
Labour	Wilfred Edgar Jones*	497		
Independent	John Alfred Frederick Wilsher	456		
Labour hold		Swing		

=== Coedffranc West Ward (one seat) ===
Coedffranc West Ward 1967
Party	Candidate	Votes	%	±%
Independent	David Henry Richards*	313		
Labour	Leslie Ball	150		
Independent hold		Swing		

=== Coedffranc West Central (one seat) ===
Coedffranc West Central 1967
Party	Candidate	Votes	%	±%
Independent	William David*	532		
Labour	Arthur Williams	123		
Independent hold		Swing		

=== Dyffryn Clydach (two seats) ===
Dyffryn Clydach 1967
Party	Candidate	Votes	%	±%
Labour	Dewi Thomas*	553		
Labour	Charles H. Button*	548		
Independent	Glyn Huckeridge	404		
Labour hold		Swing		
Labour hold		Swing		

=== Dulais Higher, Crynant Ward (one seat) ===
Dulais Higher, Crynant Ward 1967
Party	Candidate	Votes	%	±%
Labour	John Emlyn Davies*	Unopposed		
Labour hold		Swing		

=== Dulais Higher, Onllwyn Ward (one seat) ===
Dulais Higher, Onllwyn Ward 1967
Party	Candidate	Votes	%	±%
Labour	David Richards	393		
Communist	Brian Connick	318		
Majority		75		
Labour hold		Swing		

=== Dulais Higher, Seven Sisters Ward (two seats) ===
Dulais Higher, Seven Sisters Ward 1964
Party	Candidate	Votes	%	±%
Labour	Arthur Williams	642		
Labour	Richard Davies*	579		
Communist	Chris Evans	457		
Communist	Lynwood Morgan	340		
Labour hold		Swing		
Labour hold		Swing		

=== Dulais Lower (one seat) ===
Dulais Lower 1967
Party	Candidate	Votes	%	±%
Labour	Myrddin Morris*	Unopposed		
Labour hold		Swing		

=== Michaelstone Higher (one seat) ===
Michaelstone Higher 1967
Party	Candidate	Votes	%	±%
Labour	Gwilym Thomas Morgan*	Unopposed		
Labour hold		Swing		

=== Neath Higher (three seats) ===
Neath Higher 1967
Party	Candidate	Votes	%	±%
Independent	Lewis Cynlais Adams*	1,193		
Labour	Roy Llewellyn Crawley*	879		
Labour	Robert Henry Dyer	747		
Labour	Benjamin Thomas	596		
Independent	Doris Mary Morris	351		
Independent	Mair Potts	327		
Independent	Thomas Rees Thomas	237		
Independent hold		Swing		
Labour hold		Swing		
Labour gain from Independent		Swing		

=== Neath Lower (one seat) ===
Neath Lower 1967
Party	Candidate	Votes	%	±%
Labour	John Henry Evans*	Unopposed		
Labour hold		Swing		

=== Resolven, Resolven Ward (two seats) ===
Resolven, Resolven Ward 1967
Party	Candidate	Votes	%	±%
Independent	Robert Maurice Shelton	740		
Labour	William John Powell*	627		
Labour	Melvin Dilkes*	485		
Independent gain from Labour		Swing		
Labour hold		Swing		

=== Resolven, Rhigos Ward (two seats) ===
Resolven, Rhigos Ward 1967
Party	Candidate	Votes	%	±%
Independent	Henry Walters	517		
Labour	Iorwerth Williams*	460		
Labour	Eirwen Pendry	244		
Independent gain from Labour		Swing		
Labour hold		Swing		

=== Resolven, Tonna Ward (two seats) ===
Resolven, Tonna Ward 1967
Party	Candidate	Votes	%	±%
Labour	Catherine Hopkins*	821		
Labour	Idris Thomas	664		
Independent	Willie George Johns	437		
Labour hold		Swing		
Labour hold		Swing		
