= 1952 Neath Rural District Council election =

1952 Welsh local government election

An election to the Neath Rural District Council in West Glamorgan, Wales was held in May 1952. It was preceded by the 1949 election, and followed by the 1955 election.

== Overview of the results ==
The election resulted in relatively few changes in personnel as Labour comfortably upheld the majority it had held on the council since 1934.

== Boundary changes ==
The Blaenrhonddan Ward, which had hitherto elected three members, was divided into three single-member wards. The total number of seats on the authority remained the same at 29.

== Candidates ==
The profile of candidates was similar to three years previously with a number of long-serving Labour councillors returned unopposed. These included the joint 'fathers of the council', William Jones and J.T. Evans. At the new Cilfrew Ward, Albert Davies, who lost his seat three years previously, was returned unopposed.

== Outcome ==
Labour maintained in full control of the authority. The Communists lost one of their two seats at Skewen, as Alun Thomas who had in 1946 been elected both to Neath Rural and the Glamorgan County Council lost his seat.

== Ward results ==
=== Baglan Higher (one seat) ===
Baglan Higher 1952
Party	Candidate	Votes	%	±%
Labour	William Jones*	Unopposed		
Labour hold		Swing		

=== Blaengwrach (one seats) ===
Blaengwrach 1952
Party	Candidate	Votes	%	±%
Labour	Albert Vowles*	Unopposed		
Labour hold		Swing		

=== Blaenrhonddan, Bryncoch Ward (one seat) ===
Blaenrhonddan, Bryncoch Ward 1952
Party	Candidate	Votes	%	±%
Labour	J.T. Evans*	Unopposed		
Labour hold		Swing		

=== Blaenrhonddan, Cadoxton Ward (one seat) ===
Blaenrhonddan, Cadoxton Ward 1952
Party	Candidate	Votes	%	±%
Labour	Albert John*	354		
Independent	Daniel Jones*	340		
Labour gain from Independent		Swing		

=== Blaenrhonddan, Cilfrew Ward (one seat) ===
Blaenrhonddan, Cilfrew Ward 1952
Party	Candidate	Votes	%	±%
Labour	Albert Mansel Davies	Unopposed		
Labour hold		Swing		

=== Clyne (one seats) ===
Clyne 1952
Party	Candidate	Votes	%	±%
Labour	Thomas G. Allen*	347		
Independent	Wilfrid Rees	217		
Majority		230		
Labour hold		Swing		

=== Coedffranc (five seats) ===
Coedffranc 1952
Party	Candidate	Votes	%	±%
Independent	William David*	2,342		
Labour	Thomas Rees*	2,284		
Labour	Ivor L. Evans	2,055		
Independent	George Frost*	1,975		
Labour	Thomas L. Thomas	1,785		
Independent	Amy Jones*	1,581		
Labour	Rees S. Davies	1,487		
Labour	Wilfred E. Jones	1,357		
Independent hold		Swing		
Labour hold		Swing		
Labour gain from Independent		Swing		
Independent hold		Swing		
Labour hold		Swing		

=== Dyffryn Clydach (two seats) ===
Dyffryn Clydach 1952
Party	Candidate	Votes	%	±%
Independent	Gwyn Thomas*	590		
Labour	William John Griffiths	590		
Communist	Alun C. Thomas*	536		
Labour	Charles C. Button	425		
Independent hold		Swing		
Labour gain from Communist		Swing		

=== Dulais Higher, Crynant Ward (one seat) ===
Dulais Higher, Crynant Ward 1952
Party	Candidate	Votes	%	±%
Labour	John James*	Unopposed		
Labour hold		Swing		

=== Dulais Higher, Onllwyn Ward (one seat) ===
Dulais Higher, Onllwyn Ward 1952
Party	Candidate	Votes	%	±%
Communist	William John Davies*	692		
Labour	Tom Llewellyn	579		
Majority		113		
Communist hold		Swing		

=== Dulais Higher, Seven Sisters Ward (two seats) ===
Dulais Higher, Seven Sisters Ward 1952
Party	Candidate	Votes	%	±%
Labour	J. Joseph Smith	1,029		
Labour	Edith Jones*	845		
Independent	William Morris	759		
Labour hold		Swing		
Labour hold		Swing		

=== Dulais Lower (one seat) ===
Dulais Lower 1952
Party	Candidate	Votes	%	±%
Labour	J.S. George*	Unopposed		
Labour hold		Swing		

=== Michaelstone Higher (one seat) ===
Michaelstone Higher 1952
Party	Candidate	Votes	%	±%
Labour	Patrick Boyle*	246		
Independent Labour	David Davies	230		
Independent	Sidney A. Williams	164		
Majority		16		
Labour hold		Swing		

=== Neath Higher (three seats) ===
Neath Higher 1952
Party	Candidate	Votes	%	±%
Labour	Blodwen May Jones*	1,311		
Labour	Joseph James Lunn*	1,220		
Labour	Richard Arthur*	1,197		
Independent	Lewis Cynlais Adams	996		
Labour hold		Swing		
Labour hold		Swing		
Labour hold		Swing		

=== Neath Lower (one seat) ===
Neath Lower 1952
Party	Candidate	Votes	%	±%
Labour	Samuel Burnard*	Unopposed		
Labour hold		Swing		

=== Resolven, Cwmgwrach Ward (one seat) ===
Resolven, Cwmgwrach Ward 1952
Party	Candidate	Votes	%	±%
Labour	Edward John Ateyo*	Unopposed		
Labour hold		Swing		

=== Resolven, Resolven Ward (two seats) ===
Resolven, Resolven Ward 1952
Party	Candidate	Votes	%	±%
Labour	Richard Geary*	1,126		
Labour	David Hull*	716		
Independent	Richard V. Morgan	664		
Labour hold		Swing		
Labour hold		Swing		

=== Resolven, Rhigos Ward (two seats) ===
Resolven, Rhigos Ward 1952
Party	Candidate	Votes	%	±%
Labour	Iorwerth Williams*	579		
Labour	Thomas G. Powell	538		
Independent	Rees Morgan Smith*	535		
Labour hold		Swing		
Labour gain from Independent		Swing		

=== Resolven, Tonna Ward (one seat) ===
Resolven, Tonna Ward 1952
Party	Candidate	Votes	%	±%
Labour	David J. Daymond	636		
Independent	Howard P. Thomas	455		
Majority		181		
Labour hold		Swing		
