= 1931 Neath Rural District Council election =

1931 Welsh local government election

An election to the Neath Rural District Council in Wales was held on 29 March 1931. It was preceded by the 1928 election and was followed by the 1934 election.

== Overview of the results ==
Many seats were closely contested and resulted in one Labour gain.

== Ward results ==
=== Baglan Higher (one seat) ===
Baglan Higher 1931
Party	Candidate	Votes	%	±%
Labour	William Jones*	Unopposed		
Labour hold		Swing		

=== Blaengwrach (one seat) ===
Blaengwrach 1931
Party	Candidate	Votes	%	±%
Independent	Rosser Jenkins	165		
Labour	Thomas Davies	155		
Independent hold		Swing		

=== Blaenrhonddan (three seats) ===
Blaenrhonddan 1931
Party	Candidate	Votes	%	±%
Labour	J.T. Evans*	801		
Independent	Llew Jones	715		
Independent	W.A. Leyson	709		
Independent	Edward Bowen	623		
Labour hold		Swing		
Independent hold		Swing		
Independent hold		Swing		

=== Clyne (one seat) ===
Clyne 1931
Party	Candidate	Votes	%	±%
Labour	Charles. R. Kimber*	211		
Independent	J.R. Morgan	190		
Labour hold		Swing		

=== Coedffranc (five seats) ===
Coedffranc 1931
Party	Candidate	Votes	%	±%
Labour	David Jenkins	1,926		
Independent	Ogley Lewis David*	1,875		
Independent	Amy Jones*	1,645		
Labour	Mary Elizabeth Davies*	1,361		
Independent	Thomas Lloyd*	1,146		
Independent	John Harris Evans	1,053		
Labour	David Thomas	912		
Labour	William Davies*	655		
Independent	William George Long	486		
Labour	Philip Evans	462		
Communist	David John Jones	285		
Independent	David John Evans	247		
Labour hold		Swing		
Independent hold		Swing		
Independent hold		Swing		
Labour hold		Swing		
Independent hold		Swing		

=== Dyffryn Clydach (two seats) ===
Dyffryn Clydach 1931
Party	Candidate	Votes	%	±%
Labour	Joseph Thomas	309		
Independent	D.G. Davies	271		
Labour	A.H. Saunders*	236		
Independent	David Williams	229		
Labour	T. Cantle	155		
Independent	Tom Williams*	107		
Labour hold		Swing		
Independent hold		Swing		

=== Dulais Higher, Crynant Ward (one seat) ===
Dulais Higher, Crynant Ward 1931
Party	Candidate	Votes	%	±%
Independent	David Jeffreys	274		
Labour	Jenkin Morgan	267		
Independent hold		Swing		

=== Dulais Higher, Onllwyn Ward (one seat) ===
Dulais Higher, Onllwyn Ward 1931
Party	Candidate	Votes	%	±%
Labour	John James*	491		
Independent	Gwladys Thomas	386		
Labour	Walter Evans	6		
Labour hold		Swing		

=== Dulais Higher, Seven Sisters Ward (two seats) ===
Dulais Higher, Seven Sisters Ward 1931
Party	Candidate	Votes	%	±%
Labour	George Jones	541		
Independent	William Prosser	527		
Independent	Robert Brown	365		
Labour hold		Swing		
Independent hold		Swing		

=== Dulais Lower (one seat) ===
Dulais Lower 1931
Party	Candidate	Votes	%	±%
Independent	W. Haydn Rees	183		
Labour	Elizabeth F.J. Griffiths	131		
Independent hold		Swing		

=== Michaelstone Higher (one seat) ===
Michaelstone Higher 1931
Party	Candidate	Votes	%	±%
Labour	W.J. Lewis*	255		
Independent	H.W. Crouch	212		
Labour hold		Swing		

=== Neath Higher (three seats) ===
Neath Higher 1931
Party	Candidate	Votes	%	±%
Independent	David Arthur*	842		
Labour	Cliff Protheroe	763		
Labour	Morgan Morgan	756		
Labour	R.H. Taylor	644		
Independent	William Rees	578		
Conservative	E. Williams	225		
Communist	T. Williams	58		
Communist	E. Thomas	43		
Independent hold		Swing		
Labour hold		Swing		
Labour hold		Swing		

=== Neath Lower (one seat) ===
Neath Lower 1931
Party	Candidate	Votes	%	±%
Independent	J. Llewellyn Edwards*	101		
Labour	Thomas Jones	83		
Independent hold		Swing		

=== Resolven, Cwmgwrach Ward (one seat) ===
Resolven, Cwmgwrach Ward 1931
Party	Candidate	Votes	%	±%
Labour	Trevor Lewis	173		
Labour	W. Powell	133		
Independent	C.A. Purchase	79		
Communist	E. Sherlock	21		
Labour hold		Swing		

=== Resolven, Resolven Ward (two seats) ===
Resolven, Resolven Ward 1931
Party	Candidate	Votes	%	±%
Independent	D.J.Evans*	801		
Labour	Fred Thomas	484		
Independent	Arthur Davies*	379		
Labour	Llew Davies	290		
Independent	J.H. Pitts	232		
Independent hold		Swing		
Labour gain from Independent		Swing		

=== Resolven, Rhigos Ward (two seats) ===
Resolven, Rhigos Ward 1931
Party	Candidate	Votes	%	±%
Independent	James Evans*	350		
Independent	J.T. Jones*	325		
Labour	H. Walters	132		
Labour	R.J. Douglas	99		
Independent hold		Swing		
Independent hold		Swing		

=== Resolven, Tonna Ward (one seat) ===
Resolven, Tonna Ward 1931
Party	Candidate	Votes	%	±%
Independent	W.G. Harrington	348		
Labour	William Thomas	314		
Independent hold		Swing		

=== Ystradfellte (two seats) ===
Ystradfellte 1931
Party	Candidate	Votes	%	±%
Independent	Jenkin Davies	Unopposed		
Independent	James Matthews	Unopposed		
Independent hold		Swing		
Independent hold		Swing		
