= 1934 Neath Rural District Council election =

1934 Welsh local government election

An election to the Neath Rural District Council in Wales was held in March 1934. It was preceded by the 1931 election and was followed by the 1937 election.

== Overview of the results ==
Labour won control of the authority for the first time, winning sixteen seats as opposed to thirteen for the Independents.

== Boundary changes ==
Ystradfellte ward was tansferred to Breconshire, reducing the number of councillors from 31 to 29. This rural ward had long been represented by Independent councillors who were usually returned unopposed.

== Candidates ==
All seats were contested apart from Tonmawr, where the longest serving Labour member, William Jones, was returned unopposed, and Clyne, which was also taken without opposition by Labour. Most of the other seats saw Labour candidates face Independent nominees, with a small number of Independent Labour and Communist candidates.

== Outcome ==
Having won a majority for the first time, Labour councillors moved swiftly to impose their authority. Independent councillors had for the past six years denied Labour any significant roles within the council, so this was taken as a reason for Labour to reverse this position. William Jones, Tonmawr, the senior Labour councillor on the authority, who had been proposed many times as chairman, without success, was elected by fifteen votes to thirteen, with John James of Crynant elected vice-chairman by a similar margin.

== Ward results ==
=== Baglan Higher (one seat) ===
Baglan Higher 1934
Party	Candidate	Votes	%	±%
Labour	William Jones*	Unopposed		
Labour hold		Swing		

=== Blaengwrach (one seat) ===
Blaengwrach 1934
Party	Candidate	Votes	%	±%
Labour	Albert Vowles	226		
Independent	Rosser Jenkins*	134		
Majority				
Labour gain from Independent		Swing		

=== Blaenrhonddan (three seats) ===
Blaenrhonddan 1934
Party	Candidate	Votes	%	±%
Labour	J.T. Evans*	975		
Independent	Edward Bowen	641		
Independent	Llew Jones*	514		
Labour	William R. Griffiths	472		
Labour	Albert John	374		
Independent	John Morgan	349		
Labour hold		Swing		
Independent hold		Swing		
Independent hold		Swing		

=== Clyne (one seat) ===
Clyne 1934
Party	Candidate	Votes	%	±%
Labour	Charles R. Kimber	Unopposed		
Labour hold		Swing		

=== Coedffranc (five seats) ===
Coedffranc 1934
Party	Candidate	Votes	%	±%
Independent	Ogley Lewis David*	1,881		
Independent	Isaac David	1,831		
Independent	Amy Jones*	1,830		
Labour	David Jenkins*	1,739		
Labour	Mary Elizabeth Davies*	1,378		
Independent	Thomas Lloyd*	1,239		
Independent	W.T.A. Macamara	906		
Labour	David Thomas	891		
Labour	Thomas Lovering	802		
Labour	Isaac William Evans	599		
Independent	Mary Jane Reid	593		
Independent Labour	Philip Evans	393		
Independent	John Harris Evans	359		
Independent Labour	Christopher Jones	328		
Independent hold		Swing		
Independent hold		Swing		
Independent hold		Swing		
Labour hold		Swing		
Labour hold		Swing		

=== Dyffryn Clydach (two seats) ===
Dyffryn Clydach 1934
Party	Candidate	Votes	%	±%
Labour	Joseph Thomas*	353		
Independent	David Williams	330		
Independent Labour	Percy Cantle	285		
Labour	A.T. Rogers	237		
Independent Labour	Ben Jones	233		
Labour hold		Swing		
Independent hold		Swing		

=== Dulais Higher, Crynant Ward (one seat) ===
Dulais Higher, Crynant Ward 1934
Party	Candidate	Votes	%	±%
Independent	David Jeffreys*	367		
Labour	Jenkin Morgan	263		
Majority				
Independent hold		Swing		

=== Dulais Higher, Onllwyn Ward (one seat) ===
Dulais Higher, Onllwyn Ward 1934
Party	Candidate	Votes	%	±%
Labour	John James*	605		
Independent	J.T. Lewis	293		
Majority				
Labour hold		Swing		

=== Dulais Higher, Seven Sisters Ward (two seats) ===
Dulais Higher, Seven Sisters Ward 1934
Party	Candidate	Votes	%	±%
Labour	George Jones*	697		
Independent	W.P. Harries	539		
Labour	George Adams	436		
Labour hold		Swing		
Independent hold		Swing		

=== Dulais Lower (one seat) ===
Dulais Lower 1934
Party	Candidate	Votes	%	±%
Labour	J.S. George	169		
Independent	Morgan Thomas Richards	109		
Independent	Llewellyn Davies	104		
Majority				
Labour gain from Independent		Swing		

=== Michaelstone Higher (one seat) ===
Michaelstone Higher 1934
Party	Candidate	Votes	%	±%
Labour	W.J. Lewis*	305		
Independent	H.W. Crouch	147		
Majority				
Labour hold		Swing		

=== Neath Higher (three seats) ===
Neath Higher 1934
Party	Candidate	Votes	%	±%
Labour	Morgan Morgan*	925		
Independent	David Arthur*	878		
Labour	Cliff Protheroe*	863		
Labour	R.H. Taylor	654		
Communist	E. Williams	247		
Communist	W.J. Jones	90		
Communist	T. Williams	89		
Labour hold		Swing		
Independent hold		Swing		
Labour hold		Swing		

=== Neath Lower (one seat) ===
Neath Lower 1934
Party	Candidate	Votes	%	±%
Labour	Samuel Burnard*	174		
Independent	T.D. Herbert	90		
Majority				
Labour hold		Swing		

=== Resolven, Cwmgwrach Ward (one seat) ===
Resolven, Cwmgwrach Ward 1934
Party	Candidate	Votes	%	±%
Labour	Trevor Lewis*	351		
Independent	R.H. Snook	52		
Communist	Edward Sherlock	23		
Majority				
Labour hold		Swing		

=== Resolven, Resolven Ward (two seats) ===
Resolven, Resolven Ward 1934
Party	Candidate	Votes	%	±%
Independent	D.J. Evans*	657		
Labour	Fred Thomas*	651		
Independent	Benjamin Jones	474		
Labour	R. Geary	349		
Independent	A. Howell	121		
Independent hold		Swing		
Labour hold		Swing		

=== Resolven, Rhigos Ward (two seats) ===
Resolven, Rhigos Ward 1934
Party	Candidate	Votes	%	±%
Independent	R.M. Smith*	348		
Independent	James Evans*	338		
Labour	T. Williams	268		
Communist	R.J. Douglas	66		
Independent hold		Swing		
Independent hold		Swing		

=== Resolven, Tonna Ward (one seat) ===
Resolven, Tonna Ward 1934
Party	Candidate	Votes	%	±%
Independent	W.G. Harrington*	386		
Labour	William Thomas	301		
Majority				
Independent hold		Swing		
