= 1955 Neath Rural District Council election =

1955 Welsh local government election

An election to the Neath Rural District Council in West Glamorgan, Wales was held in May 1955. It was preceded by the 1952 election and followed by the 1958 election.

== Overview of the results ==
The election resulted in relatively few changes in personnel as Labour comfortably upheld its majority. Around half of the wards saw Labour candidates returned unopposed.

== Candidates ==
The profile of candidates was similar to three years previously with a number of long-serving Labour councillors returned unopposed.

== Outcome ==
Labour maintained in full control of the authority, gaining an additional three seats at the expense of the Independents. One of these was the seat at Crynant, lost at a by-election the previous year following the death of John James.

== Ward results ==
=== Baglan Higher (one seat) ===
Baglan Higher 1955
| Party | Candidate | Votes | % | ±% |
|---|---|---|---|---|
| Labour | William Jones* | Unopposed | | |
| Labour hold | | Swing | | |

=== Blaengwrach (one seats) ===
Blaengwrach 1955
| Party | Candidate | Votes | % | ±% |
|---|---|---|---|---|
| Labour | Albert Vowles* | Unopposed | | |
| Labour hold | | Swing | | |

=== Blaenrhonddan, Bryncoch Ward (one seat) ===
Blaenrhonddan, Bryncoch Ward 1955
| Party | Candidate | Votes | % | ±% |
|---|---|---|---|---|
| Labour | J.T. Evans* | Unopposed | | |
| Labour hold | | Swing | | |

=== Blaenrhonddan, Cadoxton Ward (one seat) ===
Blaenrhonddan, Cadoxton Ward 1955
| Party | Candidate | Votes | % | ±% |
|---|---|---|---|---|
| Labour | David John Davies* | 386 | | |
| Independent | Daniel Jones | 294 | | |
| Labour hold | | Swing | | |

=== Blaenrhonddan, Cilfrew Ward (one seat) ===
Blaenrhonddan, Cilfrew Ward 1955
| Party | Candidate | Votes | % | ±% |
|---|---|---|---|---|
| Labour | Albert Mansel Davies* | 274 | | |
| Independent | Thomas Edward Rees | 185 | | |
| Labour hold | | Swing | | |

=== Clyne (one seats) ===
Clyne 1955
| Party | Candidate | Votes | % | ±% |
|---|---|---|---|---|
| Labour | Thomas G. Allen* | 347 | | |
| Independent | Wilfrid Rees | 217 | | |
| Majority | | 230 | | |
| Labour hold | | Swing | | |

=== Coedffranc (five seats) ===
Coedffranc 1955
| Party | Candidate | Votes | % | ±% |
|---|---|---|---|---|
| Independent | William David* | 2,717 | | |
| Labour | Thomas Lewis Thomas* | 1,820 | | |
| Labour | Thomas Rees* | 1,747 | | |
| Labour | Clarence Gwyn Pope | 1,721 | | |
| Labour | Ivor L. Evans | 1,684 | | |
| Labour | Wilfred Edgar Jones | 1,355 | | |
| Communist | Glaslyn Morgan | 954 | | |
| Independent hold | | Swing | | |
| Labour hold | | Swing | | |
| Labour hold | | Swing | | |
| Labour gain from Independent | | Swing | | |
| Labour hold | | Swing | | |

=== Dyffryn Clydach (two seats) ===
Dyffryn Clydach 1955
| Party | Candidate | Votes | % | ±% |
|---|---|---|---|---|
| Labour | Charles H. Button | Unopposed | | |
| Labour | William John Griffiths* | Unopposed | | |
| Labour gain from Independent | | Swing | | |
| Labour hold | | Swing | | |

=== Dulais Higher, Crynant Ward (one seat) ===
Dulais Higher, Crynant Ward 1955
| Party | Candidate | Votes | % | ±% |
|---|---|---|---|---|
| Labour | John Emlyn Davies | 704 | | |
| Independent | Daniel Crynant Williams* | 291 | | |
| Labour gain from Independent | | Swing | | |

=== Dulais Higher, Onllwyn Ward (one seat) ===
Dulais Higher, Onllwyn Ward 1955
| Party | Candidate | Votes | % | ±% |
|---|---|---|---|---|
| Communist | William John Davies* | 660 | | |
| Independent Labour | Tom Llewellyn | 582 | | |
| Majority | | 78 | | |
| Communist hold | | Swing | | |

=== Dulais Higher, Seven Sisters Ward (two seats) ===
Dulais Higher, Seven Sisters Ward 1952
| Party | Candidate | Votes | % | ±% |
|---|---|---|---|---|
| Labour | J. Joseph Smith | 1,029 | | |
| Labour | Edith Jones* | 845 | | |
| Independent | William Morris | 759 | | |
| Labour hold | | Swing | | |
| Labour hold | | Swing | | |

=== Dulais Lower (one seat) ===
Dulais Lower 1955
| Party | Candidate | Votes | % | ±% |
|---|---|---|---|---|
| Labour | J.S. George* | 462 | | |
| Independent | Richard Davies Douglas Rees | 289 | | |
| Labour hold | | Swing | | |

=== Michaelstone Higher (one seat) ===
Michaelstone Higher 1955
| Party | Candidate | Votes | % | ±% |
|---|---|---|---|---|
| Labour | Gwilym Thomas Morgan | | | |
| Labour hold | | Swing | | |

=== Neath Higher (three seats) ===
Neath Higher 1955
| Party | Candidate | Votes | % | ±% |
|---|---|---|---|---|
| Labour | Richard Arthur* | Unopposed | | |
| Labour | Blodwen May Jones* | Unopposed | | |
| Labour | Joseph James Lunn* | Unopposed | | |
| Labour hold | | Swing | | |
| Labour hold | | Swing | | |
| Labour hold | | Swing | | |

=== Neath Lower (one seat) ===
Neath Lower 1955
| Party | Candidate | Votes | % | ±% |
|---|---|---|---|---|
| Labour | John Henry Evans | Unopposed | | |
| Labour hold | | Swing | | |

=== Resolven, Cwmgwrach Ward (one seat) ===
Resolven, Cwmgwrach Ward 1955
| Party | Candidate | Votes | % | ±% |
|---|---|---|---|---|
| Labour | Edward John Ateyo* | Unopposed | | |
| Labour hold | | Swing | | |

=== Resolven, Resolven Ward (two seats) ===
Resolven, Resolven Ward 1955
| Party | Candidate | Votes | % | ±% |
|---|---|---|---|---|
| Labour | David Hull* | Unopposed | | |
| Labour | William John Powell | Unopposed | | |
| Labour hold | | Swing | | |
| Labour hold | | Swing | | |

=== Resolven, Rhigos Ward (two seats) ===
Resolven, Rhigos Ward 1955
| Party | Candidate | Votes | % | ±% |
|---|---|---|---|---|
| Labour | Thomas G. Powell* | 705 | | |
| Labour | Iorwerth Williams* | 568 | | |
| Independent | Clifford Lionel Smith | 439 | | |
| Labour hold | | Swing | | |
| Labour hold | | Swing | | |

=== Resolven, Tonna Ward (one seat) ===
Resolven, Tonna Ward 1952
| Party | Candidate | Votes | % | ±% |
|---|---|---|---|---|
| Labour | David J. Daymond | 636 | | |
| Independent | Howard P. Thomas | 455 | | |
| Majority | | 181 | | |
| Labour hold | | Swing | | |
