= 1970 Neath Rural District Council election =

1970 Welsh local government election

An election to the Neath Rural District Council in West Glamorgan, Wales was held on 7 May 1970. It was preceded by the 1967 election, and was the last election to the authority as the Rural District Council was abolished at the 1974 re-organization of local government in Wales

== Overview of the results ==
The election was held shortly before the 1970 General Election, which Labour was at the time tipped to win. A Plaid Cymru challenge did not materialize.

== Candidates ==
At these final elections to the RDC, the profile of candidates was similar to three years previously with a number of long-serving Labour councillors again returned unopposed. While the Communist Party contested Seven Sisters, there was no candidate in their former stronghold of Onllwyn. At Rhigos, Independent councillor Henry Walters was returned unopposed as a Labour councillor.

== Outcome ==
Independents gained two seats at the expense of Labour while losing another two, resulting in an unchanged representation overall.

== Ward results ==
=== Baglan Higher (one seat) ===
Baglan Higher 1970
Party	Candidate	Votes	%	±%
Labour	Lilian Jones*	143		
Independent	Jephtha Emanuel Ioan Johns	42		
Labour hold		Swing		

=== Blaengwrach (two seats) ===
Blaengwrach 1970
Party	Candidate	Votes	%	±%
Independent	Clifford Graham Jones*	Unopposed		
Independent	David Emanuel Thomas*	Unopposed		
Independent hold		Swing		
Independent hold		Swing		

=== Blaenrhonddan, Bryncoch Ward (one seat) ===
Blaenrhonddan, Bryncoch Ward 1970
Party	Candidate	Votes	%	±%
Labour	Royston Jones*	1,236		
Plaid Cymru	David Huw John	460		
Labour hold		Swing		

=== Blaenrhonddan, Cadoxton Ward (one seat) ===
Blaenrhonddan, Cadoxton Ward 1970
Party	Candidate	Votes	%	±%
Labour	David John Davies*	Unopposed		
Labour hold		Swing		

=== Blaenrhonddan, Cilfrew Ward (one seat) ===
Blaenrhonddan, Cilfrew Ward 1970
Party	Candidate	Votes	%	±%
Independent	Thomas Edward Rees	197		
Labour	Eric Royle Fletcher	175		
Independent	Brian Parry Wolfe	46		
Independent gain from		Swing		

=== Clyne (one seats) ===
Clyne 1970
Party	Candidate	Votes	%	±%
Labour	Merfyn Jeffreys*	Unopposed		
Labour hold		Swing		

=== Coedffranc, South Ward (one seat) ===
Coedffranc, South Ward 1970
Party	Candidate	Votes	%	±%
Labour	Thomas L. Thomas*	609		
Independent	Ashley Clifford Tremaine Hames	128		
Independent	Ronald James	128		
Communist	Glaslyn Morgan	84		
Labour hold		Swing		

=== Coedffranc, East Central (one seat) ===
Coedffranc East Central 1970
Party	Candidate	Votes	%	±%
Independent	Martin Thomas*	521		
Labour	Dudley Florance	202		
Independent hold		Swing		

=== Coedffranc North Ward (one seat) ===
Coedffranc North Ward 1970
Party	Candidate	Votes	%	±%
Labour	Wilfred Edgar Jones*	547		
Independent	John Alfred Frederick Wilsher	460		
Labour hold		Swing		

=== Coedffranc West Ward (one seat) ===
Coedffranc West Ward 1970
Party	Candidate	Votes	%	±%
Independent	Eric Vernon Matthews*	312		
Labour	Leslie Ball	170		
Independent hold		Swing		

=== Coedffranc West Central (one seat) ===
Coedffranc West Central 1970
Party	Candidate	Votes	%	±%
Independent	William David*	521		
Labour	Arthur Williams	142		
Independent hold		Swing		

=== Dyffryn Clydach (two seats) ===
Dyffryn Clydach 1970
Party	Candidate	Votes	%	±%
Labour	Dewi Thomas*	625		
Labour	Norman Richard Thomas	567		
Independent	Idris Roy Rowlands	421		
Labour hold		Swing		
Labour hold		Swing		

=== Dulais Higher, Crynant Ward (one seat) ===
Dulais Higher, Crynant Ward 1970
Party	Candidate	Votes	%	±%
Labour	John Emlyn Davies*	Unopposed		
Labour hold		Swing		

=== Dulais Higher, Onllwyn Ward (one seat) ===
Dulais Higher, Onllwyn Ward 1970
Party	Candidate	Votes	%	±%
Labour	David Richards*	Unopposed		
Labour hold		Swing		

=== Dulais Higher, Seven Sisters Ward (two seats) ===
Dulais Higher, Seven Sisters Ward 1970
Party	Candidate	Votes	%	±%
Labour	Arthur Williams*	712		
Labour	Richard Davies*	690		
Communist	Chris Evans	349		
Communist	Lynwood Morgan	238		
Labour hold		Swing		
Labour hold		Swing		

=== Dulais Lower (one seat) ===
Dulais Lower 1970
Party	Candidate	Votes	%	±%
Labour	Myrddin Morris*	Unopposed		
Labour hold		Swing		

=== Michaelstone Higher (one seat) ===
Michaelstone Higher 1970
Party	Candidate	Votes	%	±%
Labour	Gwilym Thomas Morgan*	Unopposed		
Labour hold		Swing		

=== Neath Higher (three seats) ===
Neath Higher 1970
Party	Candidate	Votes	%	±%
Independent	Lewis Cynlais Adams*	1,204		
Labour	Robert Henry Dyer*	857		
Labour	Benjamin Thomas	712		
Labour	Annie Jeffreys	607		
Plaid Cymru	Thomas Penry Evans	543		
Independent	Doris Mary Morris	351		
Independent hold		Swing		
Labour hold		Swing		
Labour gain from Independent		Swing		

=== Neath Lower (one seat) ===
Neath Lower 1970
Party	Candidate	Votes	%	±%
Independent	David Haydn Evans	92		
Labour	Gildas Thomas	78		
Independent gain from Labour		Swing		

=== Resolven, Resolven Ward (two seats) ===
Resolven, Resolven Ward 1970
Party	Candidate	Votes	%	±%
Labour	William John Powell*	816		
Labour	Melvin Dilkes	641		
Plaid Cymru	Arthur David Griffiths	275		
Plaid Cymru	John Harris	253		
Labour hold		Swing		
Labour gain from Independent		Swing		

=== Resolven, Rhigos Ward (two seats) ===
Resolven, Rhigos Ward 1970
Party	Candidate	Votes	%	±%
Labour	Henry Walters	Unopposed		
Labour	Iorwerth Williams*	Unopposed		
Labour gain from Independent		Swing		
Labour hold		Swing		

=== Resolven, Tonna Ward (two seats) ===
Resolven, Tonna Ward 1970
Party	Candidate	Votes	%	±%
Labour	Catherine Hopkins*	Unopposed		
Labour	Idris Thomas*	Unopposed		
Labour hold		Swing		
Labour hold		Swing		
