= 1949 Neath Rural District Council election =

1949 Welsh local government election

An election to the Neath Rural District Council in West Glamorgan, Wales was held in May 1949. It was preceded by the 1946 election, and followed by the 1952 election.

== Overview of the results ==
The election resulted in relatively few changes in personnel as Labour comfortably upheld its majority.

== Candidates ==
Seven Labour candidates were returned unopposed, including the father of the council, William Jones, who had represented Baglan Higher since 1919. Once again the party contested nearly all the seats on the authority.

The main opposition came from various Independent candidates and there were also a small number of Communist candidates in addition to David Davies who defended the seat he had won at the previous election.

== Outcome ==
The main focus of interest was in the Coedffranc (Skewen) ward where two sitting councillors were defeated, namely the outgoing Labour chairman William Davies and long-serving Independent Mary Elizabeth (Bessie) Davies. Bessie Davies had originally been elected as a Labour councillor, before being elected as Independent Labour in 1937. In 1946 she stood as an Independent and a few weeks earlier had unsuccessfully sought election to Glamorgan County Council.

== Ward results ==
=== Baglan Higher (one seat) ===
Baglan Higher 1949
Party	Candidate	Votes	%	±%
Labour	William Jones*	Unopposed		
Labour hold		Swing		

=== Blaengwrach (one seats) ===
Blaengwrach 1949
Party	Candidate	Votes	%	±%
Labour	Albert Vowles*	Unopposed		
Labour hold		Swing		

=== Blaenrhonddan (three seats) ===
Blaenrhonddan 1949
Party	Candidate	Votes	%	±%
Labour	J.T. Evans*	1,211		
Independent	Daniel Jones*	995		
Labour	Albert John	892		
Labour	Albert Mansel Davies	862		
Labour hold		Swing		
Independent hold		Swing		
Labour hold		Swing		

=== Clyne (one seats) ===
Clyne 1949
Party	Candidate	Votes	%	±%
Labour	Thomas G. Allen*	Unopposed		
Labour hold		Swing		

=== Coedffranc (five seats) ===
Coedffranc 1949
Party	Candidate	Votes	%	±%
Independent	William David	2,259		
Labour	Thomas Rees*	1,933		
Independent	George Frost*	1,684		
Independent	Amy Jones*	1,387		
Labour	Isaac Evans	1,366		
Labour	William Davies*	1,301		
Independent	Mary Elizabeth Davies*	1,293		
Labour	David J. Williams	914		
Labour	Mary Cossins	806		
Independent	Hedley Thomas	591		
Independent hold		Swing		
Labour hold		Swing		
Independent hold		Swing		
Independent hold		Swing		
Labour hold		Swing		

=== Dyffryn Clydach (two seats) ===
Dyffryn Clydach 1949
Party	Candidate	Votes	%	±%
Communist	Alun C. Thomas*	583		
Independent	Gwyn Thomas	468		
Labour	William John Griffiths	442		
Labour	John Evans	402		
Communist hold		Swing		
Independent gain from Labour		Swing		

=== Dulais Higher, Crynant Ward (one seat) ===
Dulais Higher, Crynant Ward 1949
Party	Candidate	Votes	%	±%
Labour	John James*	Unopposed		
Labour hold		Swing		

=== Dulais Higher, Onllwyn Ward (one seat) ===
Dulais Higher, Onllwyn Ward 1949
Party	Candidate	Votes	%	±%
Communist	William John Davies*	760		
Labour	Emlyn Jones	442		
Majority		318		
Communist hold		Swing		

=== Dulais Higher, Seven Sisters Ward (two seats) ===
Dulais Higher, Seven Sisters Ward 1949
Party	Candidate	Votes	%	±%
Labour	J. Joseph Smith	1,042		
Labour	Edith Jones*	854		
Independent	William Morris	635		
Communist	David Davies	254		
Labour hold		Swing		
Labour hold		Swing		

=== Dulais Lower (one seat) ===
Dulais Lower 1949
Party	Candidate	Votes	%	±%
Labour	J.S. George*	Unopposed		
Labour hold		Swing		

=== Michaelstone Higher (one seat) ===
Michaelstone Higher 1949
Party	Candidate	Votes	%	±%
Labour	Patrick Boyle	369		
Independent Labour	David Davies*	297		
Majority		72		
Labour gain from Independent Labour		Swing		

=== Neath Higher (three seats) ===
Neath Higher 1949
Party	Candidate	Votes	%	±%
Labour	Blodwen May Jones*	1,679		
Labour	Richard Arthur*	1,596		
Labour	Joseph James Lunn*	1,196		
Independent	Lewis Cynlais Adams	1,007		
Communist	Evan G. Williams	409		
Labour hold		Swing		
Labour hold		Swing		
Labour hold		Swing		

=== Neath Lower (one seat) ===
Neath Lower 1949
Party	Candidate	Votes	%	±%
Labour	Samuel Burnard*	Unopposed		
Labour hold		Swing		

=== Resolven, Cwmgwrach Ward (one seat) ===
Resolven, Cwmgwrach Ward 1949
Party	Candidate	Votes	%	±%
Labour	Edward John Ateyo*	Unopposed		
Labour hold		Swing		

=== Resolven, Resolven Ward (two seats) ===
Resolven, Resolven Ward 1949
Party	Candidate	Votes	%	±%
Labour	David Hull*	937		
Labour	Richard Geary*	775		
Independent	Richard V. Morgan	738		
Labour hold		Swing		
Labour hold		Swing		

=== Resolven, Rhigos Ward (two seats) ===
Resolven, Rhigos Ward 1946
Party	Candidate	Votes	%	±%
Independent	Rees Morgan Smith*	613		
Labour	Iorwerth Williams*	491		
Labour	Herbert Stephens	382		
Labour	Herbert Stephens	382		
Communist	Howell Williams	169		
Independent hold		Swing		
Labour hold		Swing		

=== Resolven, Tonna Ward (one seat) ===
Resolven, Tonna Ward 1946
Party	Candidate	Votes	%	±%
Labour	Gethin Thomas*	606		
Independent	William George Johns	498		
Majority		108		
Labour hold		Swing		
