= 1958 Neath Rural District Council election =

1958 Welsh local government election

An election to the Neath Rural District Council in West Glamorgan, Wales was held on 8 May 1958. It was preceded by the 1955 election, and followed by the 1961 election.

== Overview of the results ==
A Labour stronghold for over twenty years, the position remained more or less the same as a result of the election, with the most notable feature being the defeat of the last Communist councillor. Over half of the wards saw Labour candidates returned unopposed.

== Candidates ==
The profile of candidates was similar to three years previously with a number of long-serving Labour councillors returned unopposed.

== Outcome ==
As noted there were very few changes, with Labour gaining a seat from the Communists and losing another, at Glyn-neath, to an Independent candidate who headed the poll.

== Ward results ==
=== Baglan Higher (one seat) ===
Baglan Higher 1958
Party	Candidate	Votes	%	±%
Labour	William Jones*	Unopposed		
Labour hold		Swing		

=== Blaengwrach (one seats) ===
Blaengwrach 1958
Party	Candidate	Votes	%	±%
Labour	Albert Vowles*	Unopposed		
Labour hold		Swing		

=== Blaenrhonddan, Bryncoch Ward (one seat) ===
Blaenrhonddan, Bryncoch Ward 1958
Party	Candidate	Votes	%	±%
Labour	J.T. Evans*	Unopposed		
Labour hold		Swing		

=== Blaenrhonddan, Cadoxton Ward (one seat) ===
Blaenrhonddan, Cadoxton Ward 1958
Party	Candidate	Votes	%	±%
Labour	David John Davies*	Unopposed		
Labour hold		Swing		

=== Blaenrhonddan, Cilfrew Ward (one seat) ===
Blaenrhonddan, Cilfrew Ward 1958
Party	Candidate	Votes	%	±%
Labour	Albert Mansel Davies*	Unopposed		
Labour hold		Swing		

=== Clyne (one seats) ===
Clyne 1958
Party	Candidate	Votes	%	±%
Labour	Thomas G. Allen*	347		
Independent	Wilfrid Rees	217		
Majority		230		
Labour hold		Swing		

=== Coedffranc (five seats) ===
Coedffranc 1958
Party	Candidate	Votes	%	±%
Independent	William David*	2,751		
Labour	Thomas Rees*	1,840		
Labour	Clarence Gwyn Pope*	1,775		
Labour	Thomas L. Thomas	1,771		
Labour	Ivor Llewellyn Evans	1,740		
Independent	Martin Thomas	1,495		
Labour	Wilfred Edgar Jones	1,365		
Communist	Glaslyn Morgan	863		
Independent hold		Swing		
Labour hold		Swing		
Labour hold		Swing		
Labour hold		Swing		
Labour hold		Swing		

=== Dyffryn Clydach (two seats) ===
Dyffryn Clydach 1982
Party	Candidate	Votes	%	±%
Labour	Charles H. Button*	Unopposed		
Labour	William John Griffiths*	Unopposed		
Labour hold		Swing		
Labour hold		Swing		

=== Dulais Higher, Crynant Ward (one seat) ===
Dulais Higher, Crynant Ward 1958
Party	Candidate	Votes	%	±%
Labour	John Emlyn Davies*	Unopposed		
Labour hold		Swing		

=== Dulais Higher, Onllwyn Ward (one seat) ===
Dulais Higher, Onllwyn Ward 1958
Party	Candidate	Votes	%	±%
Labour	Daniel Lewis	611		
Communist	William John Davies*	522		
Majority		89		
Labour gain from Communist		Swing		

=== Dulais Higher, Seven Sisters Ward (two seats) ===
Dulais Higher, Seven Sisters Ward 1958
Party	Candidate	Votes	%	±%
Labour	J. Joseph Smith*	1,237		
Labour	Richard Davies*	1,143		
Communist	David Davies	293		
Labour hold		Swing		
Labour hold		Swing		

=== Dulais Lower (one seat) ===
Dulais Lower 1958
Party	Candidate	Votes	%	±%
Labour	J.S. George*	Unopposed		
Labour hold		Swing		

=== Michaelstone Higher (one seat) ===
Michaelstone Higher 1958
Party	Candidate	Votes	%	±%
Labour	Gwilym Thomas Morgan*			
Labour hold		Swing		

=== Neath Higher (three seats) ===
Neath Higher 1958
Party	Candidate	Votes	%	±%
Independent	Lewis Cynlais Adams	1,156		
Labour	Thomas George Evans*	1,094		
Labour	Blodwen May Jones*	1,075		
Labour	Richard Arthur*	1,029		
Communist	William Irwyn Davies	337		
Independent gain from Labour		Swing		
Labour hold		Swing		
Labour hold		Swing		

=== Neath Lower (one seat) ===
Neath Lower 1955
Party	Candidate	Votes	%	±%
Labour	John Henry Evans*	Unopposed		
Labour hold		Swing		

=== Resolven, Cwmgwrach Ward (one seat) ===
Resolven, Cwmgwrach Ward 1952
Party	Candidate	Votes	%	±%
Labour	Edward John Ateyo*	Unopposed		
Labour hold		Swing		

=== Resolven, Resolven Ward (two seats) ===
Resolven, Resolven Ward 1955
Party	Candidate	Votes	%	±%
Labour	David Hull*	Unopposed		
Labour	William John Powell*	Unopposed		
Labour hold		Swing		
Labour hold		Swing		

=== Resolven, Rhigos Ward (two seats) ===
Resolven, Rhigos Ward 1952
Party	Candidate	Votes	%	±%
Labour	Iorwerth Williams*	Unopposed		
Labour	Thomas G. Powell*	Unopposed		
Labour hold		Swing		
Labour hold		Swing		

=== Resolven, Tonna Ward (one seat) ===
Resolven, Tonna Ward 1958
Party	Candidate	Votes	%	±%
Labour	David J. Daymond	661		
Independent	Nathaniel Thomas	243		
Majority		418		
Labour hold		Swing		
