= 1928 Neath Rural District Council election =

1928 Welsh local government election

An election to the Neath Rural District Council in West Glamorgan, Wales, was held in April 1928. It was preceded by the 1925 election and was followed by the 1931 election. The successful candidates were also elected to the Neath Board of Guardians.

== Overview of the results ==
Many seats were closely contested and resulted in some Labour gains.

== Ward results ==
=== Baglan Higher (one seat) ===
Baglan Higher 1928
Party	Candidate	Votes	%	±%
Labour	William Jones*	Unopposed		
Labour hold		Swing		

=== Blaengwrach (one seat) ===
Blaengwrach 1928
Party	Candidate	Votes	%	±%
Independent	W. Rees	184		
Labour	T. Davies	147		
Independent hold		Swing		

=== Blaenrhonddan (three seats) ===
Blaenrhonddan 1928
Party	Candidate	Votes	%	±%
Labour	J.T. Evans*	940		
Independent	W.A. Leyson	721		
Independent	P.H. Jenkins	481		
Independent	Edward Bowen	428		
Independent	Owen Jenkins	302		
Independent	Llewellyn Jones	295		
Labour	Thomas Thomas	57		
Labour hold		Swing		
Independent hold		Swing		
Independent hold		Swing		

=== Clyne (one seat) ===
Clyne 1928
Party	Candidate	Votes	%	±%
Labour	Charles R. Kimber	Unopposed		
Labour hold		Swing		

=== Coedffranc (five seats) ===
Coedffranc 1928
Party	Candidate	Votes	%	±%
Independent	Ogley Lewis David*	2,083		
Independent	Amy Jones*	1,598		
Independent	Henry Reason	1,469		
Ex-Serviceman	Thomas Lloyd*	1,134		
Labour	William Davies	1,021		
Labour	Mary Elizabeth Davies	989		
Independent	John Harris Evans	919		
Labour	David Thomas	801		
Labour	John Rees	797		
Labour	E.G. Smith	387		
Independent hold		Swing		
Independent hold		Swing		
Independent hold		Swing		
Independent hold		Swing		
Labour hold		Swing		

=== Dyffryn Clydach (two seats) ===
Dyffryn Clydach 1928
Party	Candidate	Votes	%	±%
Independent	Tom Williams	395		
Labour	A.H. Saunders	344		
Independent	D.G. Davies	341		
Independent hold		Swing		
Labour hold		Swing		

=== Dulais Higher, Crynant Ward (one seat) ===
Dulais Higher, Crynant Ward 1928
Party	Candidate	Votes	%	±%
Independent	David Jeffreys	274		
Independent hold		Swing		

=== Dulais Higher, Onllwyn Ward (one seat) ===
Dulais Higher, Onllwyn Ward 1928
Party	Candidate	Votes	%	±%
Labour	John James	402		
Independent	Gwladys Thomas	349		
Labour hold		Swing		

=== Dulais Higher, Seven Sisters Ward (two seats) ===
Dulais Higher, Seven Sisters Ward 1928
Party	Candidate	Votes	%	±%
Labour	George Jones*	592		
Liberal	William Prosser*	472		
Independent	David John Jones	462		
Independent	David Jenkin Jones	203		
Labour hold		Swing		
Liberal hold		Swing		

=== Dulais Lower (one seat) ===
Dulais Lower 1928
Party	Candidate	Votes	%	±%
Independent	W. Haydn Rees	166		
Independent	Elizabeth F.J. Griffiths	61		
Conservative	George C. Williams	55≤		
Independent hold		Swing		

=== Michaelstone Higher (one seat) ===
Michaelstone Higher 1928
Party	Candidate	Votes	%	±%
Labour	W.J. Lewis	243		
Independent	J. Lewis	213		
Labour gain from Independent		Swing		

=== Neath Higher (three seats) ===
Neath Higher 1928
Party	Candidate	Votes	%	±%
Independent	David Arthur*	927		
Labour	Morgan Morgan	749		
Labour	Cliff Protheroe	482		
Independent	William Rees	427		
Labour	Henry A. Jones	246		
Independent hold		Swing		
Labour hold		Swing		
Labour hold		Swing		

=== Neath Lower (one seat) ===
Neath Lower 1928
Party	Candidate	Votes	%	±%
Independent	J. Llewellyn Edwards*	161		
Labour	B. Jones	63		
Independent hold		Swing		

=== Resolven, Cwmgwrach Ward (one seat) ===
Resolven, Cwmgwrach Ward 1928
Party	Candidate	Votes	%	±%
Independent	E. Wood	200		
Labour	J.I. Powell	87		
Independent hold		Swing		

=== Resolven, Resolven Ward (two seats) ===
Resolven, Resolven Ward 1928
Party	Candidate	Votes	%	±%
Independent	Arthur Davies	582		
Independent	D.J.Evans	416		
Independent	J. Rees	415		
Labour	H. Thomas	385		
Labour	J. Potts	213		
Independent hold		Swing		
Independent hold		Swing		

=== Resolven, Rhigos Ward (two seats) ===
Resolven, Rhigos Ward 1928
Party	Candidate	Votes	%	±%
Independent	James Evans*	346		
Independent	J.T. Jones	292		
Labour	E. Williams	193		
Independent hold		Swing		
Independent hold		Swing		

=== Resolven, Tonna Ward (one seat) ===
Resolven, Tonna Ward 1928
Party	Candidate	Votes	%	±%
Independent	T. Brown	295		
Labour	A. Jenkins	281		
Independent gain from Labour		Swing		

=== Ystradfellte (two seats) ===
Ystradfellte 1928
Party	Candidate	Votes	%	±%
Independent	Jenkin Davies	Unopposed		
Independent	James Matthews	Unopposed		
Independent hold		Swing		
Independent hold		Swing		
