= 1937 Neath Rural District Council election =

1937 Welsh local government election

An election to the Neath Rural District Council in West Glamorgan, Wales was held in April 1937. It was preceded by the 1934 election and was followed, as the 1940 and 1943 elections were postponed due to the Second World War, by the 1946 election.

== Overview of the results ==
Having won control of the authority for the first time in 1934, Labour consolidated their position by winning a number of additional seats across the area with the Independent group, which previously controlled the authority, reduced to only six members.

== Candidates ==
Most seats were contested although a number of Labour candidates were returned unopposed including former chairmen William Jones (Tonmawr) and John James (Onllwyn) even though they had fallen out with their own party a few months earlier.

A feature of the election was the decision of a number of long-serving Independent members not to seek re-election. These included Ogley David, father of the Council and a member for many years, who had also recently stood down from the Glamorgan County Council. His brother, Isaac David, also stood down.

== Outcome ==
Labour captured a number of seats from the Independents, including two vacated by Independents at Blaenrhonddan, another two at Skewen (where the former Glamorgan county councillor W.P. Jenkins headed the poll), and a further seat at Crynant. Labour also regained the seat of Resolven lost at a by-election a few years previously.

== Ward results ==
=== Baglan Higher (one seat) ===
Baglan Higher 1937
Party	Candidate	Votes	%	±%
Labour	William Jones*	Unopposed		
Labour hold		Swing		

=== Blaengwrach (one seats) ===
Blaengwrach 1937
Party	Candidate	Votes	%	±%
Labour	Albert Vowles*	Unopposed		
Labour hold		Swing		

=== Blaenrhonddan (three seats) ===
Blaenrhonddan 1937
Party	Candidate	Votes	%	±%
Labour	J.T. Evans*	1.055		
Labour	William R. Griffiths	701		
Labour	Albert John	616		
Independent	Daniel Jones	602		
Independent	David Peregrine Richards	402		
Labour hold		Swing		
Labour gain from Independent		Swing		
Labour gain from Independent		Swing		

=== Clyne (one seats) ===
Clyne 1937
Party	Candidate	Votes	%	±%
Labour	Charles R. Kimber*	225		
Independent	Thomas A. Davies	188		
Majority		37		
Labour hold		Swing		

=== Coedffranc (five seats) ===
Coedffranc 1937
Party	Candidate	Votes	%	±%
Labour	W.P. Jenkins	1,764		
Independent Labour	Mary Elizabeth Davies*	1,617		
Independent	Amy Jones*	1,519		
Labour	David Jenkins*	1,382		
Labour	William Davies	1,377		
Labour	C.W. Rushby	1,275		
Labour	Thomas Lovering	1,083		
Independent	Mary Jane Reid	1,013		
Independent	W.T.A. Macamara	1,009		
Labour gain from Independent		Swing		
Independent Labour gain from Labour		Swing		
Independent hold		Swing		
Labour hold		Swing		
Labour gain from Independent		Swing		

=== Dyffryn Clydach (two seats) ===
Dyffryn Clydach 1937
Party	Candidate	Votes	%	±%
Communist	Alun C. Thomas	436		
Independent	David Williams	387		
Independent	Joseph Thomas*	274		
Labour	Percy Cantle	265		
Independent	David Johns	122		
Communist gain from Labour		Swing		
Independent hold		Swing		

=== Dulais Higher, Crynant Ward (one seat) ===
Dulais Higher, Crynant Ward 1937
Party	Candidate	Votes	%	±%
Labour	John James	334		
Independent	Daniel Davies	255		
Majority		79		
Labour gain from Independent		Swing		

=== Dulais Higher, Onllwyn Ward (one seat) ===
Dulais Higher, Onllwyn Ward 1937
Party	Candidate	Votes	%	±%
Labour	John James*	Unopposed		
Labour hold		Swing		

=== Dulais Higher, Seven Sisters Ward (two seats) ===
Dulais Higher, Seven Sisters Ward 1937
Party	Candidate	Votes	%	±%
Labour	George Jones*	747		
Independent	W.P. Harries*	554		
Labour	George Adams	450		
Labour hold		Swing		
Independent hold		Swing		

=== Dulais Lower (one seat) ===
Dulais Lower 1937
Party	Candidate	Votes	%	±%
Labour	J.S. George*	396		
Independent	Llewellyn Davies	183		
Majority		213		
Labour hold		Swing		

=== Michaelstone Higher (one seat) ===
Michaelstone Higher 1937
Party	Candidate	Votes	%	±%
Labour	Patrick Boyle	272		
Independent	William H. Crouch	165		
Majority		107		
Labour hold		Swing		

=== Neath Higher (three seats) ===
Neath Higher 1937
Party	Candidate	Votes	%	±%
Independent	David Arthur*	947		
Labour	Cliff Protheroe*	931		
Labour	Morgan Morgan*	861		
Labour	Stephen Jeffreys	573		
Independent hold		Swing		
Labour hold		Swing		
Labour hold		Swing		

=== Neath Lower (one seat) ===
Neath Lower 1937
Party	Candidate	Votes	%	±%
Labour	Samuel Burnard*	Unopposed		
Labour hold		Swing		

=== Resolven, Cwmgwrach Ward (one seat) ===
Resolven, Cwmgwrach Ward 1937
Party	Candidate	Votes	%	±%
Labour	Edward John Ateyo	Unopposed		
Labour hold		Swing		

=== Resolven, Resolven Ward (two seats) ===
Resolven, Resolven Ward 1937
Party	Candidate	Votes	%	±%
Labour	Richard Geary	718		
Independent	David John Evans*	517		
Independent	Mary Jenkins*	378		
Independent	Benjamin Jones	344		
Independent	John William Davies	109		
Labour gain from		Swing		
Independent hold		Swing		

=== Resolven, Rhigos Ward (two seats) ===
Resolven, Rhigos Ward 1937
Party	Candidate	Votes	%	±%
Independent	Rees Morgan Smith*	396		
Labour	Richard George Norman	323		
Labour	Henry Walters	317		
Independent hold		Swing		
Labour gain from Independent		Swing		

=== Resolven, Tonna Ward (one seat) ===
Resolven, Tonna Ward 1937
Party	Candidate	Votes	%	±%
Labour	Gethin Thomas	362		
Independent	Haydn Evans	358		
Majority		4		
Labour gain from Independent		Swing		
