= 1961 Neath Rural District Council election =

1961 Welsh local government election

An election to the Neath Rural District Council in West Glamorgan, Wales was held on 11 May 1961. It was preceded by the 1958 election, and followed by the 1964 election.

== Overview of the results ==
Although Labour retained the vast majority of seats, three candidates captured seats previously held by Labour. As at the previous election, over half of the wards saw Labour candidates returned unopposed.

== Candidates ==
The profile of candidates was similar to three years previously with a number of long-serving Labour councillors returned unopposed.

== Outcome ==
Three Independent gains were recorded, including at Bryncoch where Labour lost the seat held by the late J.T. Evans for over forty years. At Coedffranc, Martin Thoms, unsuccessful three years previously, took second place behind long-serving Independent William David. The third Independent victory was at Glyn-neath, where Richard Arthur, a Labour councillor for twelve years until 1958, took a seat from his former party.

== Ward results ==
=== Baglan Higher (one seat) ===
Baglan Higher 1961
Party	Candidate	Votes	%	±%
Labour	William Jones*	Unopposed		
Labour hold		Swing		

=== Blaengwrach (one seats) ===
Blaengwrach 1961
Party	Candidate	Votes	%	±%
Labour	Albert Vowles*	Unopposed		
Labour hold		Swing		

=== Blaenrhonddan, Bryncoch Ward (one seat) ===
Blaenrhonddan, Bryncoch Ward 1961
Party	Candidate	Votes	%	±%
Independent	Royston Jones	738		
Labour	Samuel Brynley Davies	449		
Independent gain from Labour		Swing		

=== Blaenrhonddan, Cadoxton Ward (one seat) ===
Blaenrhonddan, Cadoxton Ward 1961
Party	Candidate	Votes	%	±%
Labour	David John Davies*	Unopposed		
Labour hold		Swing		

=== Blaenrhonddan, Cilfrew Ward (one seat) ===
Blaenrhonddan, Cilfrew Ward 1961
Party	Candidate	Votes	%	±%
Labour	John Evans	216		
Independent	Thomas E. Rees	206		
Labour hold		Swing		

=== Clyne (one seats) ===
Clyne 1961
Party	Candidate	Votes	%	±%
Labour	Thomas G. Allen*	Unopposed		
Labour hold		Swing		

=== Coedffranc (five seats) ===
Coedffranc 1961
Party	Candidate	Votes	%	±%
Independent	William David*	2,757		
Independent	Martin Thomas	2,085		
Labour	Thomas L. Thomas*	1,878		
Labour	Ivor Llewellyn Evans*	1,841		
Labour	Thomas Rees*	1,596		
Labour	Clarence Gwyn Pope*	1,505		
Labour	Wilfred Edgar Jones	1,418		
Communist	Glaslyn Morgan	904		
Independent hold		Swing		
Independent gain from Labour		Swing		
Labour hold		Swing		
Labour hold		Swing		
Labour hold		Swing		

=== Dyffryn Clydach (two seats) ===
Dyffryn Clydach 1961
Party	Candidate	Votes	%	±%
Labour	Charles H. Button*	Unopposed		
Labour	William John Griffiths*	Unopposed		
Labour hold		Swing		
Labour hold		Swing		

=== Dulais Higher, Crynant Ward (one seat) ===
Dulais Higher, Crynant Ward 1961
Party	Candidate	Votes	%	±%
Labour	John Emlyn Davies*	Unopposed		
Labour hold		Swing		

=== Dulais Higher, Onllwyn Ward (one seat) ===
Dulais Higher, Onllwyn Ward 1961
Party	Candidate	Votes	%	±%
Labour	Daniel Lewis*	585		
Communist	William John Davies	402		
Majority		89		
Labour hold		Swing		

=== Dulais Higher, Seven Sisters Ward (two seats) ===
Dulais Higher, Seven Sisters Ward 1961
Party	Candidate	Votes	%	±%
Labour	J. Joseph Smith*	1,050		
Labour	Richard Davies*	942		
Communist	David Davies	507		
Labour hold		Swing		
Labour hold		Swing		

=== Dulais Lower (one seat) ===
Dulais Lower 1961
Party	Candidate	Votes	%	±%
Labour	J.S. George*	Unopposed		
Labour hold		Swing		

=== Michaelstone Higher (one seat) ===
Michaelstone Higher 1961
Party	Candidate	Votes	%	±%
Labour	Gwilym Thomas Morgan*	Unopposed		
Labour hold		Swing		

=== Neath Higher (three seats) ===
Neath Higher 1961
Party	Candidate	Votes	%	±%
Independent	Lewis Cynlais Adams*	1,359		
Independent	Richard Arthur*	870		
Labour	Roy Llewellyn Crawley	779		
Labour	Robert Henry Dyer	631		
Labour	Thomas George Evans*	547		
Communist	William Irwyn Davies	316		
Independent	Arthur Robert Short	182		
Independent hold		Swing		
Independent gain from Labour		Swing		
Labour hold		Swing		

=== Neath Lower (one seat) ===
Neath Lower 1961
Party	Candidate	Votes	%	±%
Labour	John Henry Evans*	Unopposed		
Labour hold		Swing		

=== Resolven, Cwmgwrach Ward (one seat) ===
Resolven, Cwmgwrach Ward 1961
Party	Candidate	Votes	%	±%
Labour	Edward John Ateyo*	Unopposed		
Labour hold		Swing		

=== Resolven, Resolven Ward (two seats) ===
Resolven, Resolven Ward 1961
Party	Candidate	Votes	%	±%
Labour	David Hull*	Unopposed		
Labour	William John Powell*	Unopposed		
Labour hold		Swing		
Labour hold		Swing		

=== Resolven, Rhigos Ward (two seats) ===
Resolven, Rhigos Ward 1961
Party	Candidate	Votes	%	±%
Labour	Iorwerth Williams*	Unopposed		
Labour	Thomas G. Powell*	Unopposed		
Labour hold		Swing		
Labour hold		Swing		

=== Resolven, Tonna Ward (one seat) ===
Resolven, Tonna Ward 1961
Party	Candidate	Votes	%	±%
Labour	David J. Daymond*	540		
Independent Labour	Nathaniel Thomas	287		
Majority		253		
Labour hold		Swing		
