= 1946 Neath Rural District Council election =

1946 Welsh local government election

An election to the Neath Rural District Council in West Glamorgan, Wales was held on 1 April 1946. It was preceded by the 1937 election, as no elections had been held in 1940 and 1943 due to the Second World War, and followed by the 1949 election.

== Overview of the results ==
Having won control of the authority for the first time in 1934, Labour consolidated their position by winning a number of additional seats across the area with the Independent group, which previously controlled the authority, reduced to only six members.

== Candidates ==
Labour, who had maintained a majority of seats on the Council since 1934, nominated almost a full slate of candidates; seven of whom were returned unpposed.

A smaller number of Independent candidates stood than in previous years, although their number was boosted by Mary Elizabeth Davies, originally a Labour councillor at Coedffranc who had been elected as Independent Labour in 1937. She now stood as a non-party candidate. British Legion candidates contested both Coedffranc and Resolven. There were also a number of Communist candidates, including Alun Thomas who had recently taken the Coedffranc county council seat from Labour.

== Outcome ==
The outcome of the election saw a mixed picture as Labour gained seats from the Independents, but the chairman of the Council Council, John James, was defeated at Onllwyn by a Communist candidate. Alun Thomas successfully defended his seat at Dyffryn Clydach, where Labour took the second seat an Independent. At Seven Sisters, Labour also gained a seat from the Independents, although Communist candidate Evan Lewis came within 64 votes of defeating the veteran Labour councillor, George Jones.

A notable feature was the success of British Legion candidates at Coedffranc and Resolven. Significantly, the result at Coedffranc echoed a precedent in 1919 when an ex-serviceman was elected in the same ward.

== Ward results ==
=== Baglan Higher (one seat) ===
Baglan Higher 1946
Party	Candidate	Votes	%	±%
Labour	William Jones*	Unopposed		
Labour hold		Swing		

=== Blaengwrach (one seats) ===
Blaengwrach 1946
Party	Candidate	Votes	%	±%
Labour	Albert Vowles*	Unopposed		
Labour hold		Swing		

=== Blaenrhonddan (three seats) ===
Blaenrhonddan 1946
Party	Candidate	Votes	%	±%
Labour	J.T. Evans*	1,188		
Independent	Daniel Jones	892		
Labour	Albert Mansel Davies	877		
Labour	William James Down	846		
Labour hold		Swing		
Independent gain from Labour		Swing		
Labour hold		Swing		

=== Clyne (one seats) ===
Clyne 1946
Party	Candidate	Votes	%	±%
Labour	Thomas G. Allen	Unopposed		
Labour hold		Swing		

=== Coedffranc (five seats) ===
Coedffranc 1946
Party	Candidate	Votes	%	±%
British Legion	George Frost	2,069		
Independent	Mary Elizabeth Davies*	1,925		
Independent	Amy Jones*	1,877		
Labour	Thomas Rees	1,440		
Labour	William Davies*	1,334		
Labour	David Jenkins*	1,269		
Labour	D. Thomas	943		
Trade Unionist	H. Benyon	806		
Labour	H. Jones	783		
Independent hold		Swing		
Independent gain from Independent Labour		Swing		
Independent hold		Swing		
Labour hold		Swing		
Labour hold		Swing		

=== Dyffryn Clydach (two seats) ===
Dyffryn Clydach 1946
Party	Candidate	Votes	%	±%
Communist	Alun C. Thomas*	672		
Labour	Gwyn Davies	497		
British Legion	Henry Phillips	430		
Independent	David Williams*	247		
Communist hold		Swing		
Labour gain from Independent		Swing		

=== Dulais Higher, Crynant Ward (one seat) ===
Dulais Higher, Crynant Ward 1946
Party	Candidate	Votes	%	±%
Labour	John James*	505		
Independent	Daniel C. Williams	354		
Majority		151		
Labour hold		Swing		

=== Dulais Higher, Onllwyn Ward (one seat) ===
Dulais Higher, Onllwyn Ward 1946
Party	Candidate	Votes	%	±%
Communist	William John Davies	670		
Labour	John James*	540		
Majority		130		
Communist gain from Labour		Swing		

=== Dulais Higher, Seven Sisters Ward (two seats) ===
Dulais Higher, Seven Sisters Ward 1946
Party	Candidate	Votes	%	±%
Labour	Edith Jones	815		
Labour	George Jones*	707		
Communist	Evan Lewis	643		
Independent	William Morris	434		
Independent	W.P. Harries*	226		
Labour gain from Independent		Swing		
Labour hold		Swing		

=== Dulais Lower (one seat) ===
Dulais Lower 1946
Party	Candidate	Votes	%	±%
Labour	J.S. George*	Unopposed		
Labour hold		Swing		

=== Michaelstone Higher (one seat) ===
Michaelstone Higher 1946
Party	Candidate	Votes	%	±%
Independent Labour	David Davies	279		
Labour	Patrick Boyle*	250		
Communist	David H. Griffiths	116		
Majority		29		
Independent Labour gain from Labour		Swing		

=== Neath Higher (three seats) ===
Neath Higher 1946
Party	Candidate	Votes	%	±%
Labour	Blodwen May Jones*	946		
Independent	Richard Arthur	935		
Labour	Joseph James Lunn*	668		
Labour	Lewis Cynlais Adams	594		
Independent	David Arthur*	535		
Independent	William Morgan Davies	497		
Independent	Ralph Vincent Morgan	474		
Independent	Aubrey Jenkins	438		
Independent	Clifford Harrett Harries	387		
Communist	Evan G. Williams	330		
Independent Labour	T. Challacombe	266		
Independent	William Henry Morris	126		
Labour hold		Swing		
Independent gain from Independent		Swing		
Labour hold		Swing		

=== Neath Lower (one seat) ===
Neath Lower 1946
Party	Candidate	Votes	%	±%
Labour	Samuel Burnard*	Unopposed		
Labour hold		Swing		

=== Resolven, Cwmgwrach Ward (one seat) ===
Resolven, Cwmgwrach Ward 1946
Party	Candidate	Votes	%	±%
Labour	Edward John Ateyo*	Unopposed		
Labour hold		Swing		

=== Resolven, Resolven Ward (two seats) ===
Resolven, Resolven Ward 1946
Party	Candidate	Votes	%	±%
Labour	Richard Geary*	930		
British Legion	T. Roberts	610		
Labour	Richard V. Morgan	585		
Independent	Benjamin Jones	430		
Independent	Griffith J. Thomas	240		
Labour hold		Swing		
Independent hold		Swing		

=== Resolven, Rhigos Ward (two seats) ===
Resolven, Rhigos Ward 1946
Party	Candidate	Votes	%	±%
Independent	Rees Morgan Smith*	509		
Labour	Iorwerth Williams	301		
Labour	Richard George Norman*	226		
Independent	Henry Walters	209		
Independent	William David Evans	196		
Independent hold		Swing		
Labour hold		Swing		

=== Resolven, Tonna Ward (one seat) ===
Resolven, Tonna Ward 1946
Party	Candidate	Votes	%	±%
Labour	Gethin Thomas*	622		
Independent	Rev D.J. Walters	401		
Majority		221		
Labour hold		Swing		
