= 1964 Neath Rural District Council election =

1964 Welsh local government election

An election to the Neath Rural District Council in West Glamorgan, Wales was held on 7 May 1964. It was preceded by the 1961 election, and followed by the 1967 election.

== Boundary changes ==
The overall number of seats was increased from 29 to 30 by the creation of an additional seat at Tonna while the Coedffranc ward which had returned five members foe many decades was divided into five single-member wards.

== Overview of the results ==
As at previous elections, Labour retained the vast majority of seats, but suffered some losses to the Independents.

== Candidates ==
The profile of candidates was similar to three years previously with a number of long-serving Labour councillors returned unopposed. However, William Jones, the father of the Council was challenged for the first time in 30 years.

== Outcome ==
William Jones narrowly held on in Baglan Higher while Labour lost a seat at Coedffranc.

== Ward results ==
=== Baglan Higher (one seat) ===
Baglan Higher 1964
| Party | Candidate | Votes | % | ±% |
|---|---|---|---|---|
| Labour | William Jones* | 133 | | |
| Independent | Denys Trevelyn Brace | 127 | | |
| Labour hold | | Swing | | |

=== Blaengwrach (two seats) ===
Blaengwrach 1964
| Party | Candidate | Votes | % | ±% |
|---|---|---|---|---|
| Independent | Clifford Graham Jones* | 414 | | |
| Independent | Ddavid Emanuel Thomas* | 382 | | |
| Labour | Henry Abraham | 323 | | |
| Labour | William Henry Rees | 320 | | |
| Independent hold | | Swing | | |
| Independent hold | | Swing | | |

=== Blaenrhonddan, Bryncoch Ward (one seat) ===
Blaenrhonddan, Bryncoch Ward 1964
| Party | Candidate | Votes | % | ±% |
|---|---|---|---|---|
| Independent | Royston Jones | Unopposed | | |
| Independent hold | | Swing | | |

=== Blaenrhonddan, Cadoxton Ward (one seat) ===
Blaenrhonddan, Cadoxton Ward 1964
| Party | Candidate | Votes | % | ±% |
|---|---|---|---|---|
| Labour | David John Davies* | Unopposed | | |
| Labour hold | | Swing | | |

=== Blaenrhonddan, Cilfrew Ward (one seat) ===
Blaenrhonddan, Cilfrew Ward 1964
| Party | Candidate | Votes | % | ±% |
|---|---|---|---|---|
| Labour | John Evans* | Unopposed | | |
| Labour hold | | Swing | | |

=== Clyne (one seats) ===
Clyne 1964
| Party | Candidate | Votes | % | ±% |
|---|---|---|---|---|
| Labour | Merfyn Jeffreys | Unopposed | | |
| Labour hold | | Swing | | |

=== Coedffranc, South Ward (one seat) ===
Coedffranc, South Ward 1964
| Party | Candidate | Votes | % | ±% |
|---|---|---|---|---|
| Labour | Thomas L. Thomas* | 592 | | |
| Independent | Marshall Kelvin Abell | 150 | | |
| Communist | Glaslyn Morgan | 100 | | |
| Labour hold | | Swing | | |

=== Coedffranc, East Central (one seat) ===
Coedffranc East Central 1964
| Party | Candidate | Votes | % | ±% |
|---|---|---|---|---|
| Independent | Martin Thomas* | 431 | | |
| Labour | Ronald George Day* | 414 | | |
| Independent hold | | Swing | | |

=== Coedffranc North Ward (one seat) ===
Coedffranc North Ward 1964
| Party | Candidate | Votes | % | ±% |
|---|---|---|---|---|
| Labour | Wilfred Edgar Jones | 665 | | |
| Independent | Samuel Harold Howell Davies | 166 | | |
| Communist | Mordecai Morgan | 69 | | |
| Labour hold | | Swing | | |

=== Coedffranc West Ward (one seat) ===
Coedffranc West Ward 1964
| Party | Candidate | Votes | % | ±% |
|---|---|---|---|---|
| Independent | David Henry Richards | 283 | | |
| Labour | Ivor Llewellyn Evans* | 166 | | |
| Independent gain from Labour | | Swing | | |

=== Coedffranc West Central (one seat) ===
Coedffranc West Central 1964
| Party | Candidate | Votes | % | ±% |
|---|---|---|---|---|
| Independent | William David* | 526 | | |
| Labour | Clarence Gwyn Pope | 194 | | |
| Independent hold | | Swing | | |

=== Dyffryn Clydach (two seats) ===
Dyffryn Clydach 1964
| Party | Candidate | Votes | % | ±% |
|---|---|---|---|---|
| Labour | Dewi Thomas* | 692 | | |
| Labour | Charles H. Button* | 639 | | |
| Independent | Edward Vernon James | 385 | | |
| Communist | Iestyn John Jenkins | 150 | | |
| Labour hold | | Swing | | |
| Labour hold | | Swing | | |

=== Dulais Higher, Crynant Ward (one seat) ===
Dulais Higher, Crynant Ward 1964
| Party | Candidate | Votes | % | ±% |
|---|---|---|---|---|
| Labour | John Emlyn Davies* | Unopposed | | |
| Labour hold | | Swing | | |

=== Dulais Higher, Onllwyn Ward (one seat) ===
Dulais Higher, Onllwyn Ward 1964
| Party | Candidate | Votes | % | ±% |
|---|---|---|---|---|
| Labour | Daniel Lewis* | 621 | | |
| Communist | Brian Connick | 145 | | |
| Majority | | 476 | | |
| Labour hold | | Swing | | |

=== Dulais Higher, Seven Sisters Ward (two seats) ===
Dulais Higher, Seven Sisters Ward 1964
| Party | Candidate | Votes | % | ±% |
|---|---|---|---|---|
| Labour | J. Joseph Smith* | 899 | | |
| Labour | Richard Davies* | 735 | | |
| Communist | Chris Evans | 476 | | |
| Communist | William Jones | 222 | | |
| Labour hold | | Swing | | |
| Labour hold | | Swing | | |

=== Dulais Lower (one seat) ===
Dulais Lower 1964
| Party | Candidate | Votes | % | ±% |
|---|---|---|---|---|
| Labour | Myrddin Morris | Unopposed | | |
| Labour hold | | Swing | | |

=== Michaelstone Higher (one seat) ===
Michaelstone Higher 1964
| Party | Candidate | Votes | % | ±% |
|---|---|---|---|---|
| Labour | Gwilym Thomas Morgan* | Unopposed | | |
| Labour hold | | Swing | | |

=== Neath Higher (three seats) ===
Neath Higher 1964
| Party | Candidate | Votes | % | ±% |
|---|---|---|---|---|
| Independent | Lewis Cynlais Adams* | 1,096 | | |
| Independent | Richard Arthur* | 934 | | |
| Labour | Roy Llewellyn Crawley* | 894 | | |
| Labour | Thomas George Evans | 536 | | |
| Independent | Benjamin Thomas | 428 | | |
| Labour | Aubrey Jenkins | 423 | | |
| Communist | William Irwyn Davies | 200 | | |
| Independent hold | | Swing | | |
| Independent hold | | Swing | | |
| Labour hold | | Swing | | |

=== Neath Lower (one seat) ===
Neath Lower 1964
| Party | Candidate | Votes | % | ±% |
|---|---|---|---|---|
| Labour | John Henry Evans* | Unopposed | | |
| Labour hold | | Swing | | |

=== Resolven, Resolven Ward (two seats) ===
Resolven, Resolven Ward 1964
| Party | Candidate | Votes | % | ±% |
|---|---|---|---|---|
| Labour | William John Powell* | 742 | | |
| Labour | Melvin Dilks | 661 | | |
| Independent | Gwynne Morgan | 446 | | |
| Labour hold | | Swing | | |
| Labour hold | | Swing | | |

=== Resolven, Rhigos Ward (two seats) ===
Resolven, Rhigos Ward 1964
| Party | Candidate | Votes | % | ±% |
|---|---|---|---|---|
| Labour | Iorwerth Williams* | Unopposed | | |
| Labour | Thomas G. Powell* | Unopposed | | |
| Labour hold | | Swing | | |
| Labour hold | | Swing | | |

=== Resolven, Tonna Ward (two seats) ===
Resolven, Tonna Ward 1964
| Party | Candidate | Votes | % | ±% |
|---|---|---|---|---|
| Labour | Catherine Hopkins | 680 | | |
| Labour | David J. Daymond* | 485 | | |
| Independent | Nathaniel Thomas | 370 | | |
| Labour win (new seat) | | | | |
| Labour hold | | Swing | | |
