= Neath Rural District =

Former district in Glamorgan, Wales, UK

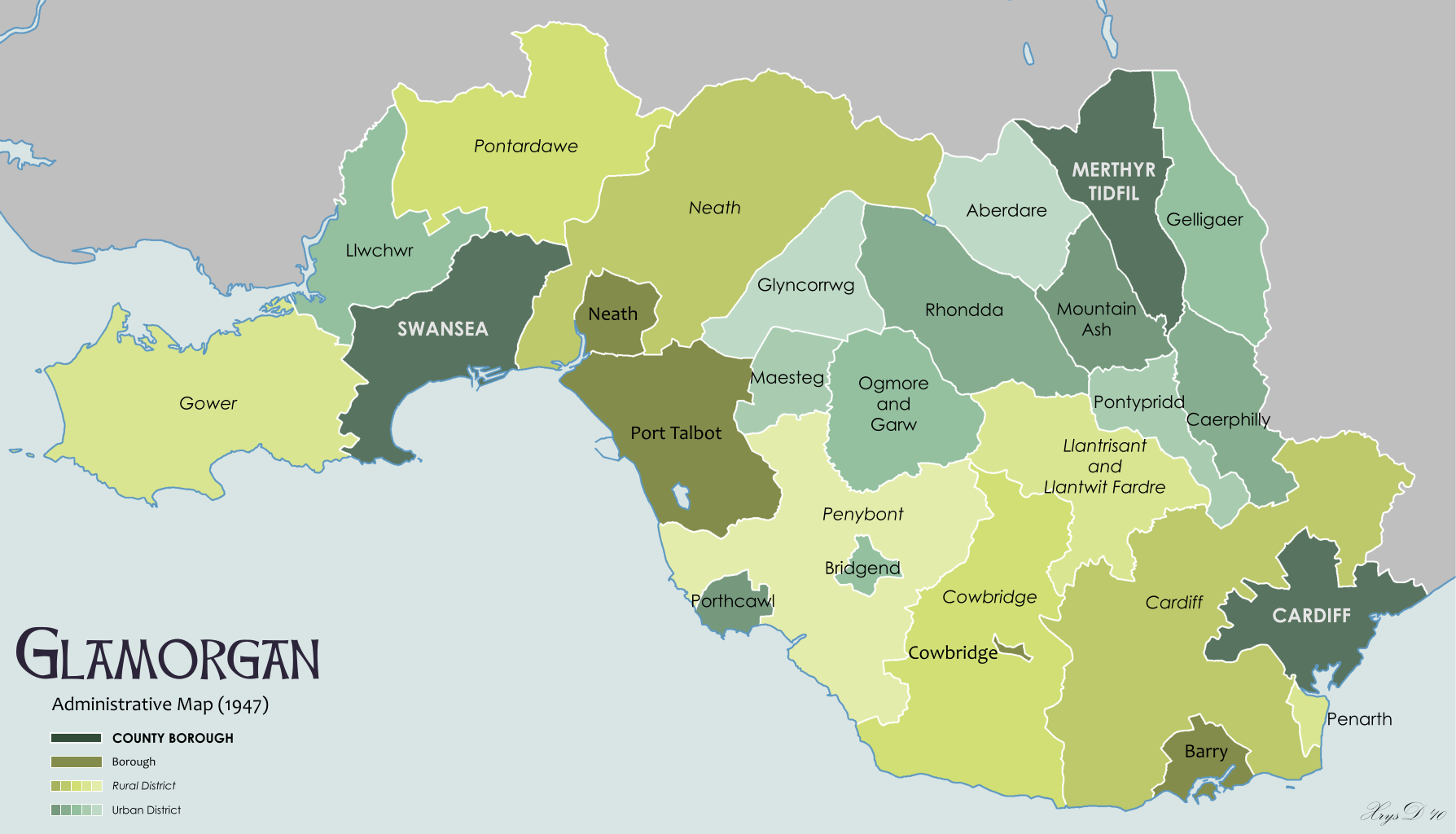
Local government divisions of Glamorgan in 1947 (Cardiff, Swansea and Merthyr Tydfil were separate county boroughs)

Neath Rural District was a second tier local government district of Glamorgan, Wales until 1974. It covered the Neath and Dulais valleys and surrounding areas, and while it contained rural communities it was largely dominated by industry, notably coal mining.

== Background ==
Neath Rural District was created in December 1894 and from the 1930s onwards was controlled by the Labour Party.

== Neath Rural District Council ==
Neath Rural District Council was the local authority administering Neath Rural District. The council was responsible for sanitation, public health and housing. It later gained the powers of an urban district council, to make bye-laws for developments such as new streets and buildings. The council's last full elections were held on 7 May 1970.

== Dissolution ==
As a result of the Local Government Act 1972, Neath Rural District was abolished and, in 1974, it was incorporated into the new Neath Borough Council.

== See also ==
- List of rural and urban districts in Wales in 1973
