= 1963 Hale Urban District Council election =

Local election in Cheshire, England

← 1962	11 May 1963	1964 →

4 of 12 seats to Hale Urban District Council 6 seats needed for a majority
	First party	Second party	Third party
Party	Conservative	Liberal	Residents
Last election	3 seats, 49.6%	1 seats, 50.4%	did not contest
Seats before	9	3	0
Seats won	2	1	1
Seats after	8	3	1
Seat change	▼1	Steady	▲1
Popular vote	2,062	1,527	1,195
Percentage	39.4%	29.2%	22.8%
Swing	▼10.2%	▼21.2%	N/A
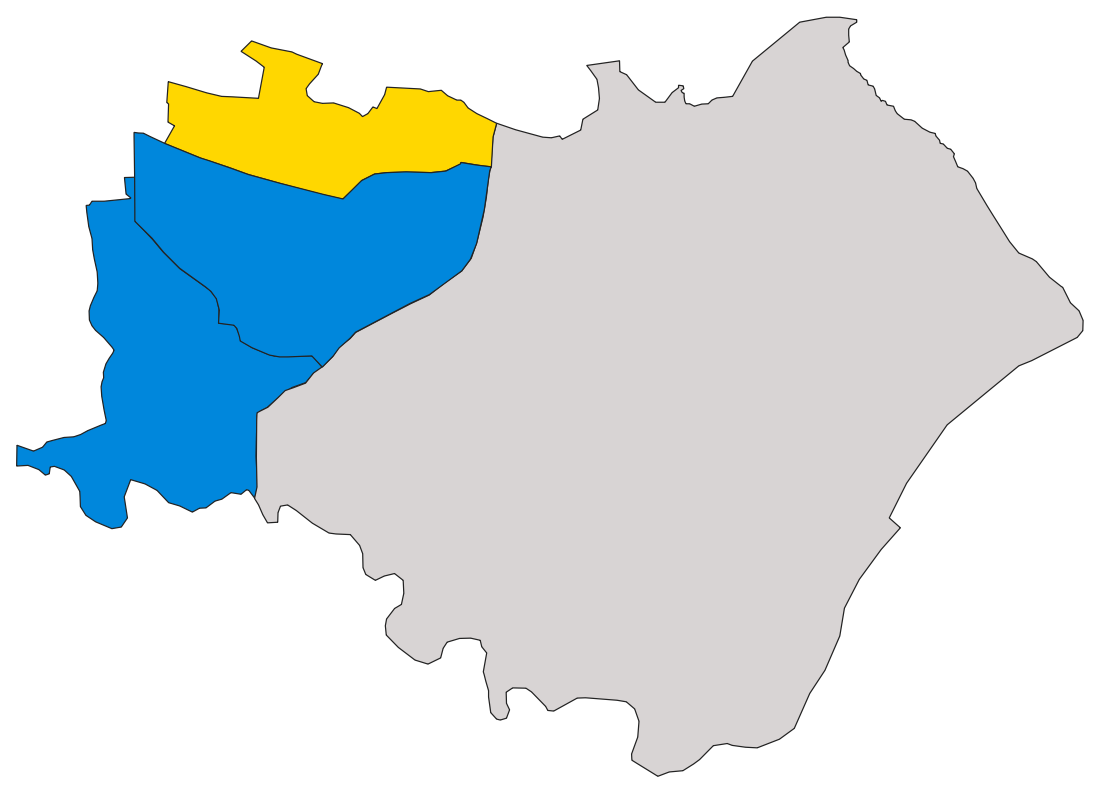
- Map of results of 1963 election
Leader of the Council before election
Conservative
Leader of the Council after election
Conservative

Elections to Hale Council were held on Saturday, 11 May 1963. One third of the councillors were up for election, with each successful candidate to serve a three-year term of office. The Conservative Party retained overall control of the council.

== Election result ==
Party	Votes		Seats			Full Council	
Conservative Party	2,062 (39.4%)	▼10.2	2 (50.0%)	2 / 4	▼1	8 (66.7%)	8 / 12
Liberal Party	1,527 (29.2%)	▼21.2	1 (25.0%)	1 / 4	Steady	3 (25.0%)	3 / 12
Residents	1,195 (22.8%)	N/A	1 (25.0%)	1 / 4	▲1	1 (8.3%)	1 / 12
Labour Party	450 (8.6%)	N/A	0 (0.0%)	0 / 4	N/A	0 (0.0%)	0 / 12

↓
3	1	8

== Ward results ==
=== Central ===
Central
Party	Candidate	Votes	%	±%
Conservative	W. Aspinall*	uncontested		
Conservative hold		Swing		

=== North ===
North
Party	Candidate	Votes	%	±%
Liberal	R. A. McCall-Roberts*	538	36.8	−27.9
Conservative	B. C. Angold	473	32.4	−2.9
Labour	J. Cope	450	30.8	N/A
Majority		65	4.4	−25.0
Turnout		1,461		
Liberal hold		Swing		

=== South East ===
South East
Party	Candidate	Votes	%	±%
Residents	J. Barker	1,195	40.1	N/A
Conservative	J. A. Bolton	1,157	38.8	−15.0
Liberal	J. Lomas	630	21.1	−25.1
Majority		38	1.3	
Turnout		2,982		
Residents gain from Conservative		Swing		

=== West ===
West
Party	Candidate	Votes	%	±%
Conservative	A. I. Gregory*	432	54.6	+3.4
Liberal	F. R. Orrell	359	45.4	−3.4
Majority		73	9.2	+6.8
Turnout		791		
Conservative hold		Swing		
