= 1964 Hale Urban District Council election =

Local election in Cheshire, England

← 1963	9 May 1964	1965 →

4 of 12 seats to Hale Urban District Council 6 seats needed for a majority
	First party	Second party	Third party
Party	Conservative	Liberal	Residents
Last election	2 seats, 39.4%	1 seats, 29.2%	1 seats, 22.8%
Seats before	8	3	1
Seats won	3	0	1
Seats after	8	2	2
Seat change	Steady	▼1	▲1
Popular vote	2,394	1,139	960
Percentage	47.3%	22.5%	19.0%
Swing	▲7.9%	▼6.7%	▼3.8%
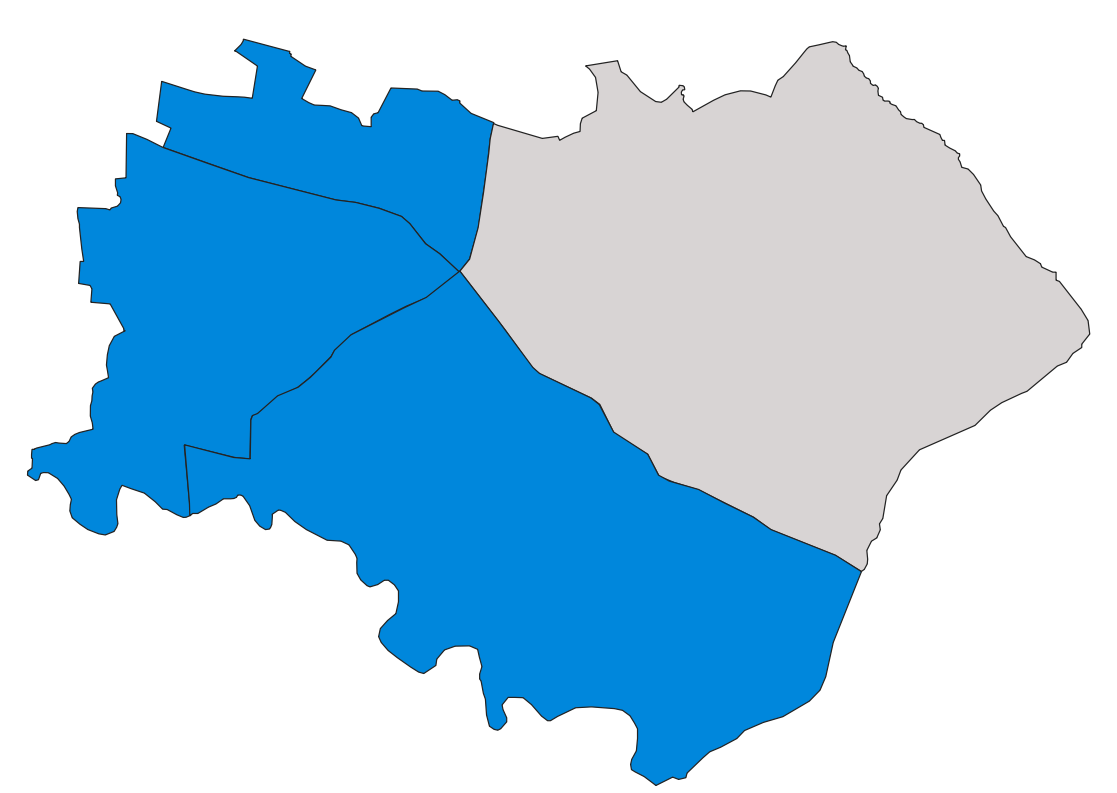
- Map of results of 1964 election
Leader of the Council before election
Conservative
Leader of the Council after election
Conservative

Elections to Hale Council were held on Saturday, 9 May 1964. One third of the councillors were up for election, with each successful candidate to serve a three-year term of office. Extensive ward boundary changes came into effect at this election, however, the number of councillors was retained and displaced members were allocated to newly created wards for the remainder of their terms.

The Conservative Party retained overall control of the council.

== Election result ==
Party	Votes		Seats			Full Council	
Conservative Party	2,394 (47.3%)	▲7.9	3 (75.0%)	3 / 4	Steady	8 (66.7%)	8 / 12
Liberal Party	1,139 (22.5%)	▼6.7	0 (0.0%)	0 / 4	▼1	2 (16.7%)	2 / 12
Residents	960 (19.0%)	▼3.8	1 (25.0%)	1 / 4	▲1	2 (16.7%)	2 / 12
Labour Party	563 (11.1%)	▲2.5	0 (0.0%)	0 / 4	Steady	0 (0.0%)	0 / 12

↓
2	2	8

== Ward results ==
=== Bollin ===
Bollin
Party	Candidate	Votes	%	±%
Conservative	J. S. Pickles*	uncontested		
Conservative hold		Swing		

=== Central ===
Central
Party	Candidate	Votes	%	±%
Conservative	W. A. L. Sawyer*	1,098	66.5	
Liberal	J. H. Darling	552	33.5	
Majority		546	33.0	
Turnout		1,650	49.9	
Conservative hold		Swing		

=== North ===
North
Party	Candidate	Votes	%	±%
Conservative	R. Godwin	705	38.0	
Liberal	E. P. Atkin*	587	31.6	
Labour	J. Cope	563	30.4	
Majority		118	6.4	
Turnout		1,855	63.5	
Conservative gain from Liberal		Swing		

=== Wellgreen ===
Wellgreen
Party	Candidate	Votes	%	±%
Residents	S. A. Hatton	960	61.9	
Conservative	W. J. Geddes	591	38.1	
Majority		369	23.8	
Turnout		1,551	63.1	
Residents gain from Conservative		Swing		
