= 1969 Hale Urban District Council election =

Local election in Cheshire, England

← 1968	10 May 1969	1970 →

5 of 12 seats to Hale Urban District Council 6 seats needed for a majority
	First party	Second party	Third party
Party	Conservative	Liberal	Residents
Last election	2 seats, 57.9%	1 seats, 28.7%	1 seats, 13.4%
Seats before	7	2	3
Seats won	4	1	0
Seats after	9	2	1
Seat change	▲2	Steady	▼2
Popular vote	3,579	1,608	1,482
Percentage	53.7%	24.1%	22.2%
Swing	▼4.2%	▼4.6%	▲8.8%
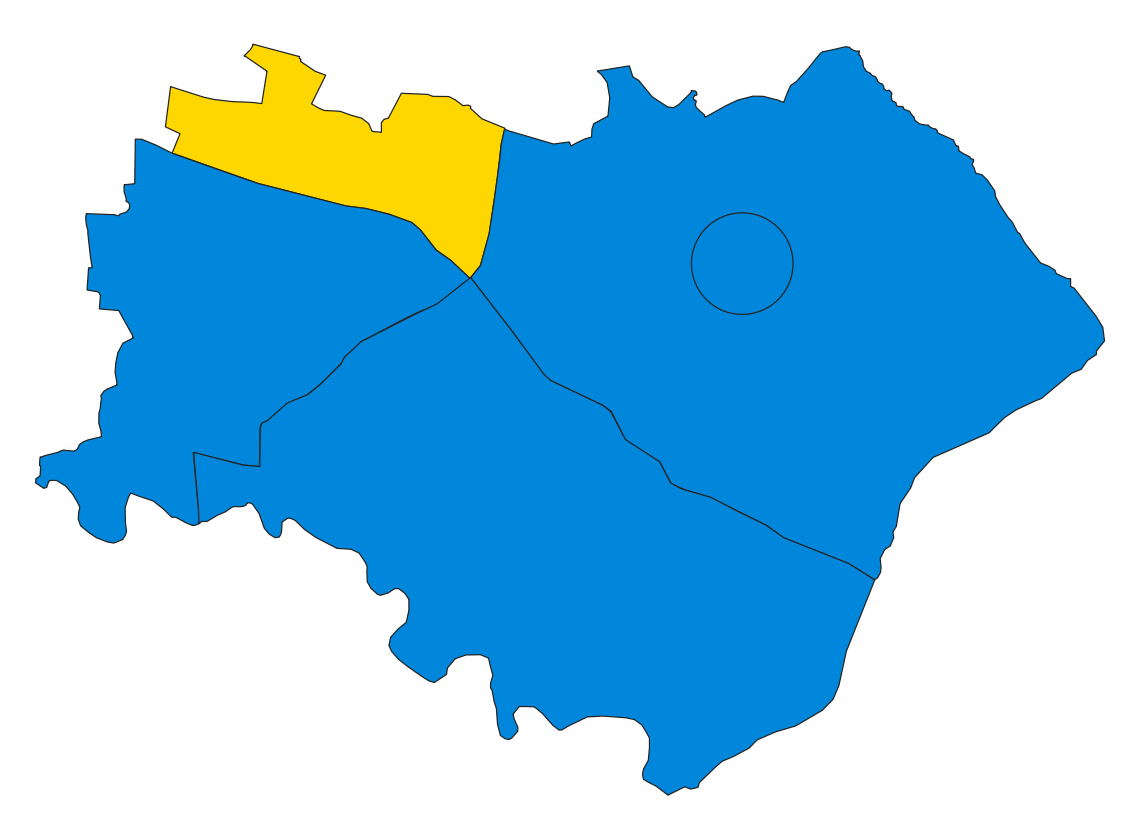
- Map of results of 1969 election
Leader of the Council before election
Conservative
Leader of the Council after election
Conservative

Elections to Hale Council were held on Saturday, 10 May 1969. One third of the councillors were up for election, with each successful candidate to serve a three-year term of office. The Conservative Party retained overall control of the council.

== Election result ==
Party	Votes		Seats			Full Council	
Conservative Party	3,579 (53.7%)	▼4.2	4 (80.0%)	4 / 5	▲2	9 (75.0%)	9 / 12
Liberal Party	1,608 (24.1%)	▼4.6	1 (20.0%)	1 / 5	Steady	2 (16.7%)	2 / 12
Residents	1,482 (22.2%)	▲8.8	0 (0.0%)	0 / 5	▼2	1 (8.3%)	1 / 12

↓
2	1	9

== Ward results ==
=== Bollin ===
Bollin
Party	Candidate	Votes	%	±%
Conservative	R. A. Roberts	uncontested		
Conservative hold		Swing		

=== Central ===
Central
Party	Candidate	Votes	%	±%
Conservative	N. W. Barrett	1,131	61.8	−1.3
Liberal	A. G. Taylor	699	38.2	+1.3
Majority		432	23.6	−2.6
Turnout		1,830	54.8	−0.5
Conservative hold		Swing		

=== North ===
North
Party	Candidate	Votes	%	±%
Liberal	E. P. Atkin*	909	53.9	0.0
Conservative	A. Knott	779	46.1	0.0
Majority		130	7.8	0.0
Turnout		1,688	57.8	0.0
Liberal hold		Swing		

=== Wellgreen ===
Wellgreen (2 vacancies)
Party	Candidate	Votes	%	±%
Conservative	W. G. Stewart	836	51.2	+6.5
Conservative	P. A. A. Pepper	833	51.0	+6.3
Residents	R. Hainsworth*	774	47.4	−7.9
Residents	H. James	708	43.3	−12.0
Majority		59	3.6	
Turnout		1,634	61.0	+0.6
Conservative gain from Residents		Swing		
Conservative gain from Residents		Swing		
