= 1967 Hale Urban District Council election =

Local election in Cheshire, England

← 1966	6 May 1967	1968 →

4 of 12 seats to Hale Urban District Council 6 seats needed for a majority
	First party	Second party	Third party
Party	Conservative	Residents	Liberal
Last election	2 seats, 46.3%	1 seats, 29.3%	1 seats, 17.6%
Seats before	7	3	2
Seats won	3	1	0
Seats after	7	3	2
Seat change	Steady	Steady	Steady
Popular vote	835	0	777
Percentage	46.0%	0.0%	42.8%
Swing	▼0.3%	▼29.3%	▲25.2%
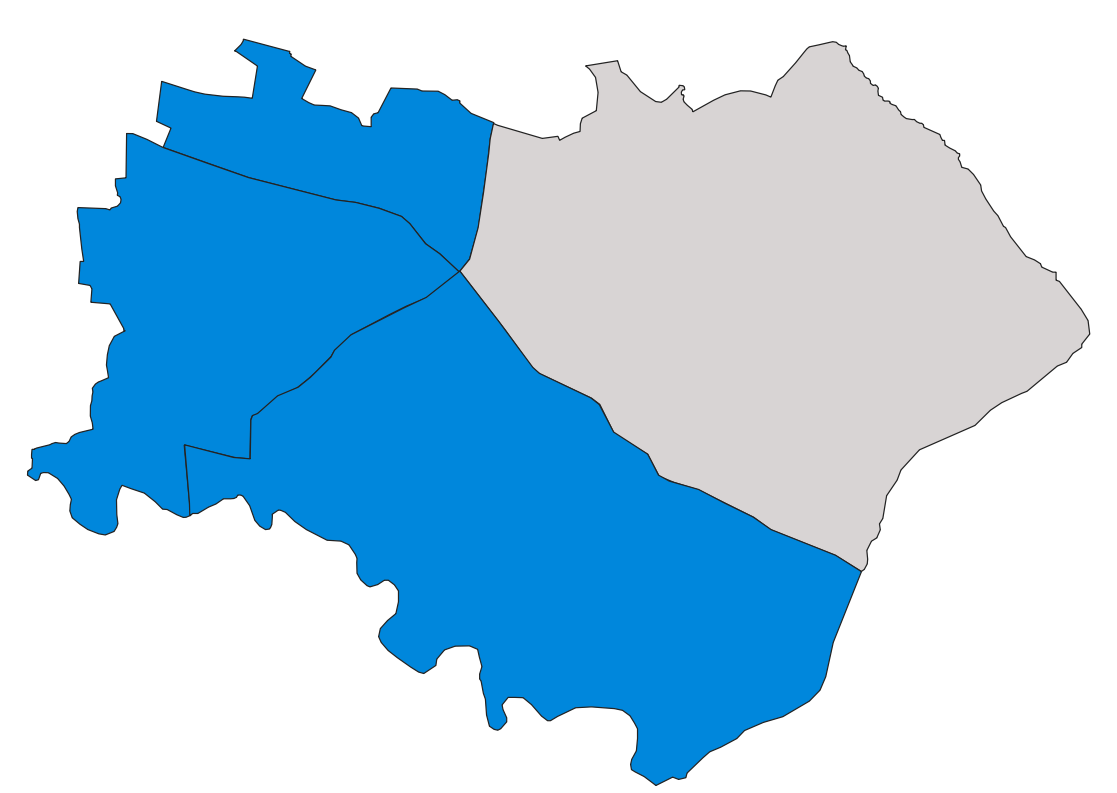
- Map of results of 1967 election
Leader of the Council before election
Conservative
Leader of the Council after election
Conservative

Elections to Hale Council were held on Saturday, 6 May 1967. One third of the councillors were up for election, with each successful candidate to serve a three-year term of office. The Conservative Party retained overall control of the council.

== Election result ==
Party	Votes		Seats			Full Council	
Conservative Party	835 (46.0%)	▼0.3	3 (75.0%)	3 / 4	Steady	7 (58.3%)	7 / 12
Residents	0 (0.0%)	▼29.3	1 (25.0%)	1 / 4	Steady	3 (25.0%)	3 / 12
Liberal Party	777 (42.8%)	▲25.2	0 (0.0%)	0 / 4	Steady	2 (16.7%)	2 / 12
Labour Party	202 (11.3%)	▲4.3	0 (0.0%)	0 / 4	Steady	0 (0.0%)	0 / 12

↓
2	3	7

== Ward results ==
=== Bollin ===
Bollin
Party	Candidate	Votes	%	±%
Conservative	J. S. Pickles*	uncontested		
Conservative hold		Swing		

=== Central ===
Central
Party	Candidate	Votes	%	±%
Conservative	W. A. L. Sawyer*	uncontested		
Conservative hold		Swing		

=== North ===
North
Party	Candidate	Votes	%	±%
Conservative	R. Godwin*	835	46.0	+8.3
Liberal	A. D. Young	777	42.8	−3.5
Labour	D. R. Merriman	202	11.1	−6.9
Majority		58	3.2	
Turnout		1,814	63.2	+1.1
Conservative hold		Swing		

=== Wellgreen ===
Wellgreen
Party	Candidate	Votes	%	±%
Residents	S. A. Hatton*	uncontested		
Residents hold		Swing		
