= 1972 Hale Urban District Council election =

Local election in Cheshire, England

← 1971	6 May 1972	1973 Trafford →

5 of 12 seats to Hale Urban District Council 6 seats needed for a majority
	First party	Second party
Party	Conservative	Liberal
Last election	2 seats, 46.8%	2 seats, 37.2%
Seats before	8	4
Seats won	3	2
Seats after	8	4
Seat change	Steady	Steady
Popular vote	2,337	1,405
Percentage	54.1%	32.5%
Swing	▼3.2%	▼10.2%
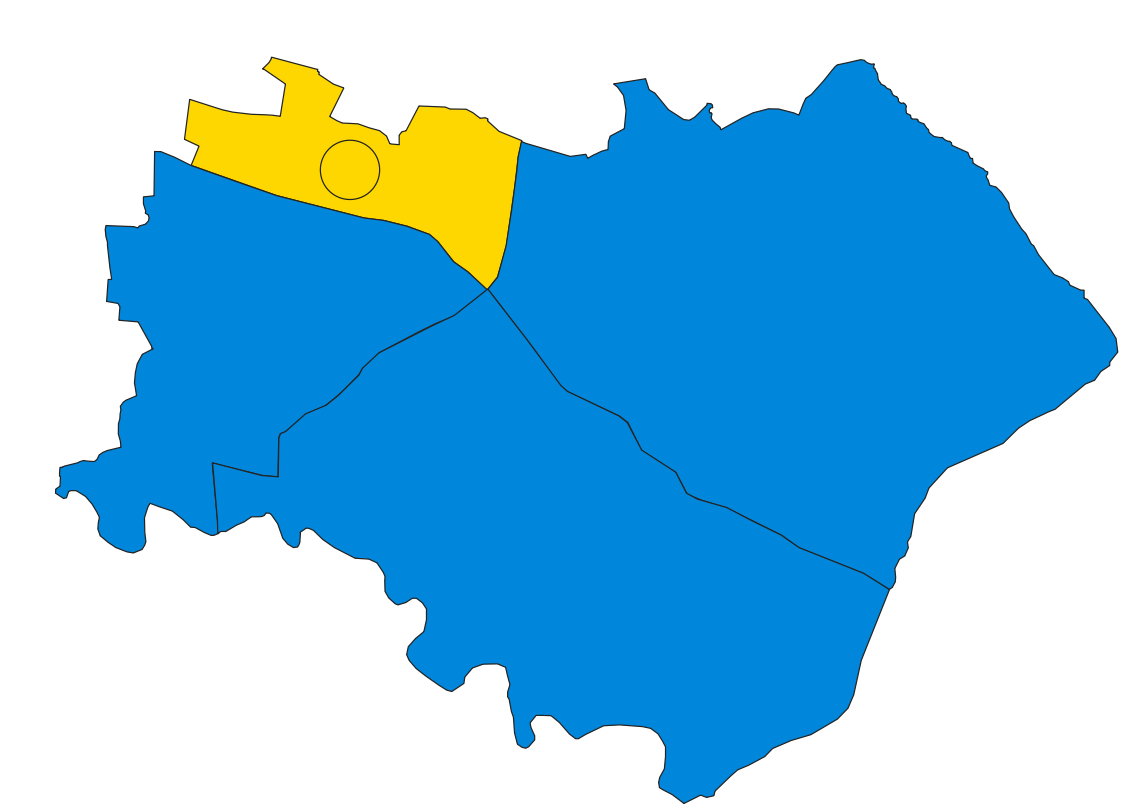
- Map of results of 1972 election
Leader of the Council before election
Conservative
Leader of the Council after election
Conservative

Elections to Hale Council were held on Saturday, 6 May 1972. One third of the councillors were up for election, with each successful candidate to serve a two-year term of office. These were the final elections held in Hale before it became part of Trafford. The Conservative Party retained overall control of the council.

== Election result ==
Party	Votes		Seats			Full Council	
Conservative Party	2,337 (54.1%)	▼3.2	3 (60.0%)	3 / 5	Steady	8 (66.7%)	8 / 12
Liberal Party	1,405 (32.5%)	▼10.2	2 (40.0%)	2 / 5	Steady	4 (33.3%)	4 / 12
Labour Party	575 (13.3%)	N/A	0 (0.0%)	0 / 5	N/A	0 (0.0%)	0 / 12

↓
4	8

== Ward results ==
=== Bollin ===
Bollin
Party	Candidate	Votes	%	±%
Conservative	R. A. Roberts*	uncontested		
Conservative hold		Swing		

=== Central ===
Central
Party	Candidate	Votes	%	±%
Conservative	N. W. Barrett*	uncontested		
Conservative hold		Swing		

=== North ===
North (2 vacancies)
Party	Candidate	Votes	%	±%
Liberal	E. P. Atkin*	744	50.8	
Liberal	C. G. Ball	661	45.1	
Conservative	G. Worthington	620	42.3	
Conservative	I. Grossock	587	40.1	
Majority		41	2.8	
Turnout		1,465	48.5	
Liberal hold		Swing		
Liberal hold		Swing		

=== Wellgreen ===
Wellgreen
Party	Candidate	Votes	%	±%
Conservative	M. F. Stewart	1,130	66.3	+3.1
Labour	M. P. Whitehead	575	33.7	N/A
Majority		555	32.6	+6.2
Turnout		1,705	55.7	+4.4
Conservative hold		Swing		
