= 1970 Hale Urban District Council election =

Local election in Cheshire, England

← 1969	9 May 1970	1971 →

4 of 12 seats to Hale Urban District Council 6 seats needed for a majority
	First party	Second party	Third party
Party	Conservative	Liberal	Residents
Last election	4 seats, 53.7%	1 seats, 24.1%	0 seats, 22.2%
Seats before	9	2	1
Seats won	2	2	0
Seats after	7	4	1
Seat change	▼2	▲2	Steady
Popular vote	2,496	1,987	856
Percentage	46.8%	37.2%	16.0%
Swing	▼6.9%	▲13.1%	▼6.2%
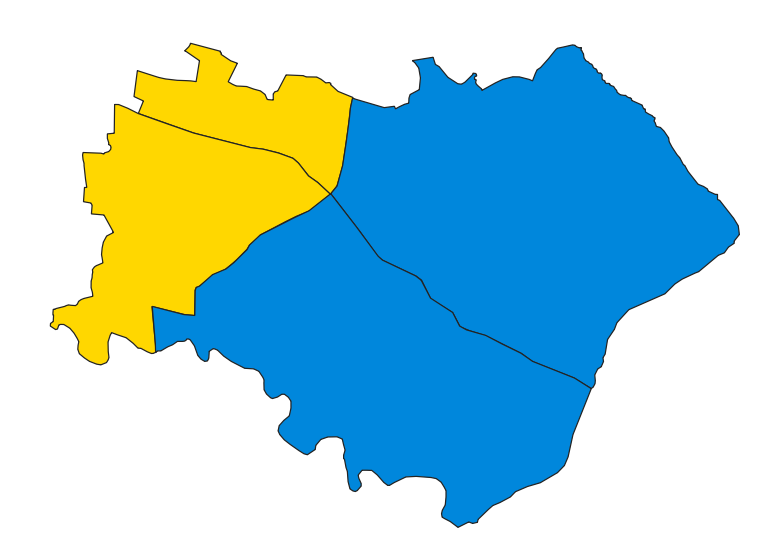
- Map of results of 1970 election
Leader of the Council before election
Conservative
Leader of the Council after election
Conservative

Elections to Hale Council were held on Saturday, 9 May 1970. One third of the councillors were up for election, with each successful candidate to serve a three-year term of office. The Conservative Party retained overall control of the council.

== Election result ==
Party	Votes		Seats			Full Council	
Conservative Party	2,496 (46.8%)	▼6.9	2 (50.0%)	2 / 4	▼2	7 (58.3%)	7 / 12
Liberal Party	1,987 (37.2%)	▲13.1	2 (50.0%)	2 / 4	▲2	4 (33.3%)	4 / 12
Residents	856 (16.0%)	▼6.2	0 (0.0%)	0 / 4	Steady	1 (8.3%)	1 / 12

↓
4	1	7

== Ward results ==
=== Bollin ===
Bollin
Party	Candidate	Votes	%	±%
Conservative	J. S. Pickles*	uncontested		
Conservative hold		Swing		

=== Central ===
Central
Party	Candidate	Votes	%	±%
Liberal	A. G. Taylor	1,034	54.2	+16.0
Conservative	W. A. L. Sawyer*	837	45.8	−16.0
Majority		161	8.4	
Turnout		1,907	55.8	−1.0
Liberal gain from Conservative		Swing		

=== North ===
North
Party	Candidate	Votes	%	±%
Liberal	J. W. Parker	953	56.0	+2.1
Conservative	J. Jenner	750	44.0	−2.1
Majority		203	12.0	+4.2
Turnout		1,703	56.4	−1.4
Liberal gain from Conservative		Swing		

=== Wellgreen ===
Wellgreen
Party	Candidate	Votes	%	±%
Conservative	P. A. A. Pepper*	909	51.5	+0.3
Residents	H. James	856	48.5	+1.1
Majority		53	3.0	−0.6
Turnout		1,765	62.0	+1.0
Conservative hold		Swing		
