= 1966 Hale Urban District Council election =

Local election in Cheshire, England

← 1965	14 May 1966	1967 →

4 of 12 seats to Hale Urban District Council 6 seats needed for a majority
	First party	Second party	Third party
Party	Conservative	Residents	Liberal
Last election	2 seats, 25.3%	1 seats, 28.2%	1 seats, 35.1%
Seats before	7	3	2
Seats won	2	1	1
Seats after	7	3	2
Seat change	Steady	Steady	Steady
Popular vote	2,207	1,395	837
Percentage	46.3%	29.3%	17.6%
Swing	▲21.0%	▲1.1%	▼17.5%
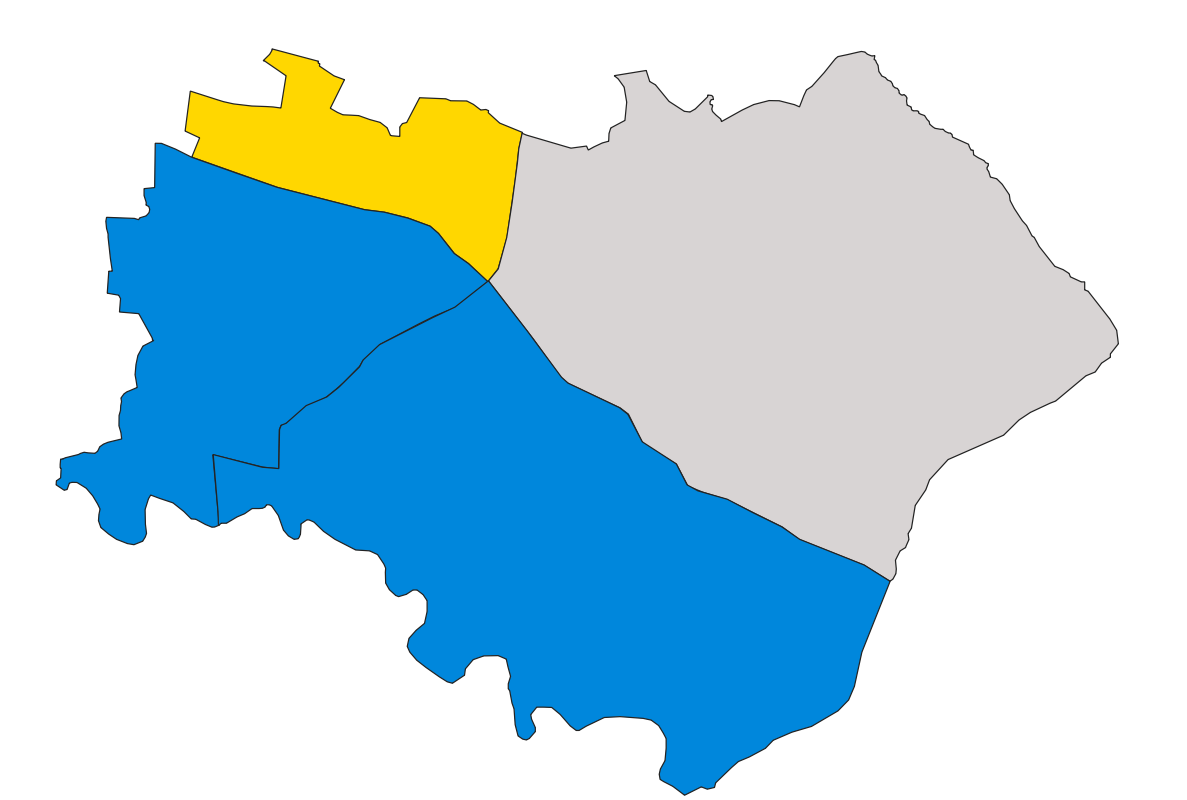
- Map of results of 1966 election
Leader of the Council before election
Conservative
Leader of the Council after election
Conservative

Elections to Hale Council were held on Saturday, 14 May 1966. One third of the councillors were up for election, with each successful candidate to serve a three-year term of office. The Conservative Party retained overall control of the council.

== Election result ==
Party	Votes		Seats			Full Council	
Conservative Party	2,207 (46.3%)	▲21.0	2 (50.0%)	2 / 4	Steady	7 (58.3%)	7 / 12
Residents	1,395 (29.3%)	▲1.1	1 (25.0%)	1 / 4	Steady	3 (25.0%)	3 / 12
Liberal Party	837 (17.6%)	▼17.5	1 (25.0%)	1 / 4	Steady	2 (16.7%)	2 / 12
Labour Party	325 (6.8%)	▼4.7	0 (0.0%)	0 / 4	Steady	0 (0.0%)	0 / 12

↓
2	3	7

== Ward results ==
=== Bollin ===
Bollin
Party	Candidate	Votes	%	±%
Conservative	C. W. King	883	61.1	
Residents	J. P. Barker*	562	38.9	
Majority		321	22.2	
Turnout		1,445	54.9	
Conservative gain from Residents		Swing		

=== Central ===
Central
Party	Candidate	Votes	%	±%
Conservative	A. I. Gregory*	uncontested		
Conservative hold		Swing		

=== North ===
North
Party	Candidate	Votes	%	±%
Liberal	E. P. Atkin	837	46.3	−29.1
Conservative	T. H. Stanley	646	35.7	N/A
Labour	C. Dixon	325	18.0	−6.6
Majority		191	10.6	−40.2
Turnout		1,808	62.1	+12.0
Liberal gain from Conservative		Swing		

=== Wellgreen ===
Wellgreen
Party	Candidate	Votes	%	±%
Residents	R. Hainsworth	833	55.1	+2.4
Conservative	A. M. Hanrahan	678	44.9	−2.4
Majority		155	10.2	+4.8
Turnout		1,511	57.3	−7.1
Residents gain from Liberal		Swing		
