= Hale Urban District =

Government district in Cheshire, England (1900–1974)

Coordinates: 53°27′N 2°21′W

- History
  - Created: 1900
  - Abolished: 1974
  - Succeeded by: Metropolitan Borough of Trafford
- Status: Urban district

Hale Urban District was, from 1900 to 1974, a local government district in the administrative county of Cheshire, England, which covered the town of Hale and the village of Hale Barns.

The Urban District was created under the terms of the Local Government Act 1894. In 1974, Hale Urban District was abolished by the Local Government Act 1972 and its area transferred to the new county of Greater Manchester to form part of the Metropolitan Borough of Trafford.

== Local elections ==
- 1960 Hale Urban District Council election
- 1961 Hale Urban District Council election
- 1962 Hale Urban District Council election
- 1963 Hale Urban District Council election
- 1964 Hale Urban District Council election
- 1965 Hale Urban District Council election
- 1966 Hale Urban District Council election
- 1967 Hale Urban District Council election
- 1968 Hale Urban District Council election
- 1969 Hale Urban District Council election
- 1970 Hale Urban District Council election
- 1971 Hale Urban District Council election
- 1972 Hale Urban District Council election
