= 1962 Hale Urban District Council election =

Local election in Cheshire, England

| ← 1961 | 12 May 1962 | 1963 → |

4 of 12 seats to Hale Urban District Council 6 seats needed for a majority
| | First party | Second party |
|---|---|---|
| Party | Conservative | Liberal |
| Last election | 3 seats, 39.7% | 1 seats, 60.3% |
| Seats before | 9 | 3 |
| Seats won | 3 | 1 |
| Seats after | 9 | 3 |
| Seat change | Steady | Steady |
| Popular vote | 3,161 | 3,210 |
| Percentage | 49.6% | 50.4% |
| Swing | ▲9.9% | ▼9.9% |
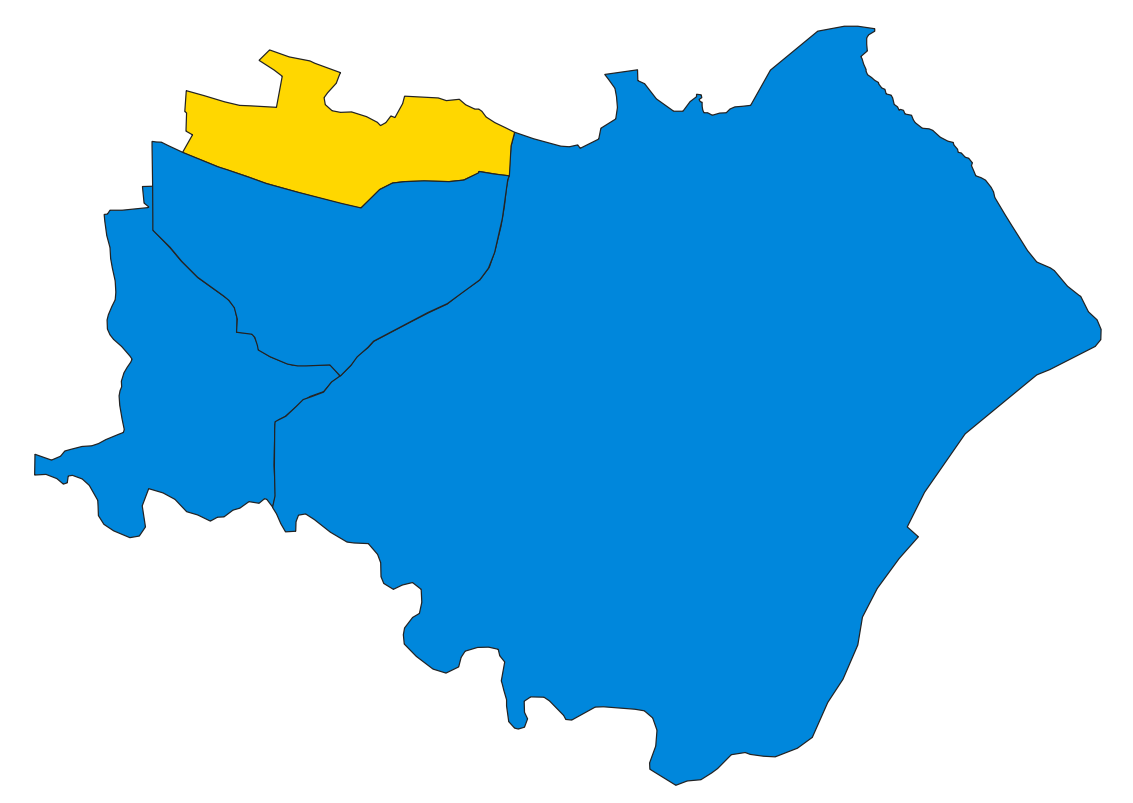
- Map of results of 1962 election
Leader of the Council before election
Conservative
Leader of the Council after election
Conservative

Elections to Hale Council were held on Saturday, 12 May 1962. One third of the councillors were up for election, with each successful candidate to serve a three-year term of office. The Conservative Party retained overall control of the council.

== Election result ==
| Party | Votes | | Seats | | | Full Council | |
| Conservative Party | 3,161 (49.6%) | ▲9.9 | 3 (75.0%) | 3 / 4 | Steady | 8 (75.0%) | 9 / 12 |
| Liberal Party | 3,210 (50.4%) | ▼9.9 | 1 (25.0%) | 1 / 4 | Steady | 3 (25.0%) | 3 / 12 |

↓
| 3 | 9 |

== Ward results ==
=== Central ===
Central
| Party | Candidate | Votes | % | ±% |
|---|---|---|---|---|
| Conservative | B. S. Hall | 854 | 55.4 | N/A |
| Liberal | C. Corker | 687 | 44.6 | N/A |
| Majority | | 167 | 10.8 | N/A |
| Turnout | | 1,541 | | |
| Conservative hold | | Swing | | |

=== North ===
North
| Party | Candidate | Votes | % | ±% |
|---|---|---|---|---|
| Liberal | E. Wilkinson* | 944 | 64.7 | +4.4 |
| Conservative | B. S. Hall | 516 | 35.3 | −4.4 |
| Majority | | 428 | 29.4 | +8.8 |
| Turnout | | 1,460 | | |
| Liberal hold | | Swing | | |

=== South East ===
South East
| Party | Candidate | Votes | % | ±% |
|---|---|---|---|---|
| Conservative | R. W. Gurney* | 1,369 | 53.8 | N/A |
| Liberal | N. Oldfield | 1,176 | 46.2 | N/A |
| Majority | | 193 | 7.6 | N/A |
| Turnout | | 2,545 | | |
| Conservative hold | | Swing | | |

=== West ===
West
| Party | Candidate | Votes | % | ±% |
|---|---|---|---|---|
| Conservative | H. Bennett* | 422 | 51.2 | N/A |
| Liberal | J. W. Priestner | 403 | 48.8 | N/A |
| Majority | | 19 | 2.4 | N/A |
| Turnout | | 825 | | |
| Conservative hold | | Swing | | |
