= 1965 Hale Urban District Council election =

Local election in Cheshire, England

← 1964	15 May 1965	1966 →

4 of 12 seats to Hale Urban District Council 6 seats needed for a majority
	First party	Second party	Third party
Party	Conservative	Residents	Liberal
Last election	3 seats, 47.3%	1 seats, 19.0%	0 seats, 22.5%
Seats before	8	2	2
Seats won	2	1	1
Seats after	7	3	2
Seat change	▼1	▲1	Steady
Popular vote	796	887	1,108
Percentage	25.3%	28.2%	35.1%
Swing	▼22.0%	▲9.2%	▲12.6%
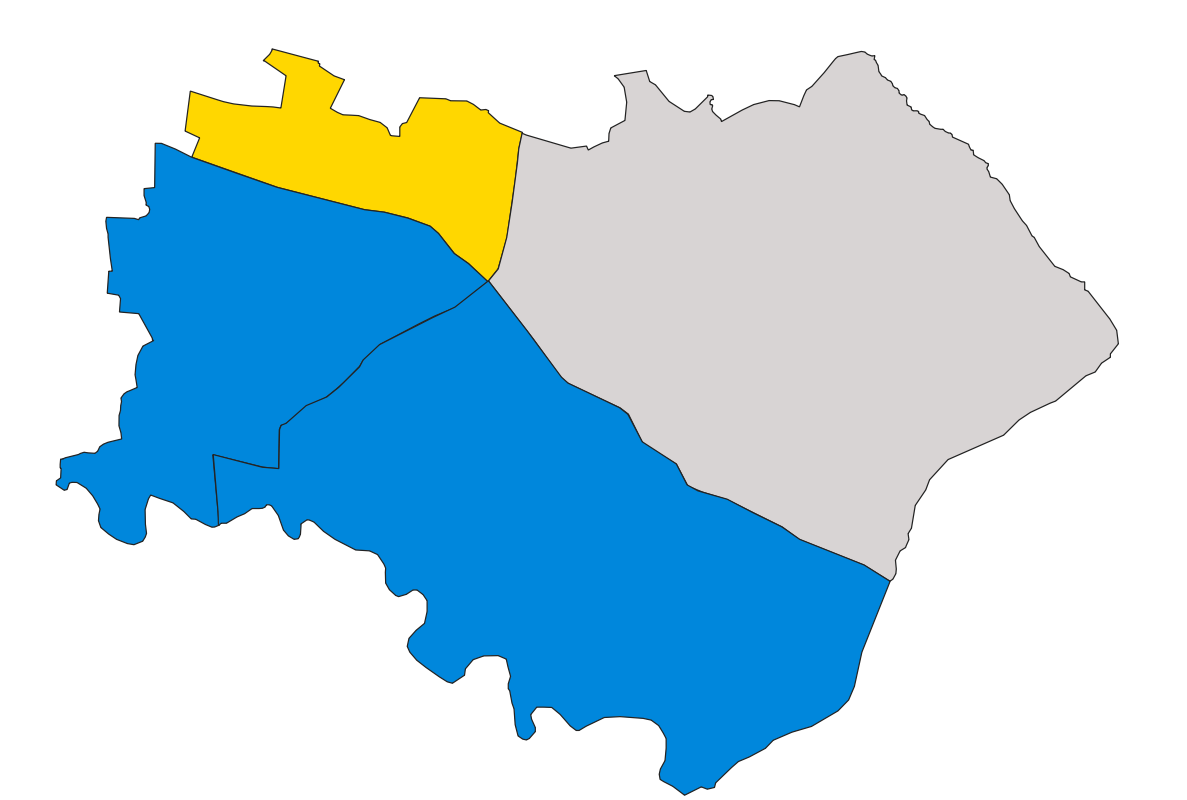
- Map of results of 1965 election
Leader of the Council before election
Conservative
Leader of the Council after election
Conservative

Elections to Hale Council were held on Saturday, 15 May 1965. One third of the councillors were up for election, with each successful candidate to serve a three-year term of office. The Conservative Party retained overall control of the council.

== Election result ==
Party	Votes		Seats			Full Council	
Conservative Party	796 (25.3%)	▼22.0	2 (50.0%)	2 / 4	▼1	7 (58.3%)	7 / 12
Residents	887 (28.2%)	▲9.2	1 (25.0%)	1 / 4	▲1	3 (25.0%)	3 / 12
Liberal Party	1,108 (35.1%)	▲12.6	1 (25.0%)	1 / 4	Steady	2 (16.7%)	2 / 12
Labour Party	361 (11.5%)	▲0.4	0 (0.0%)	0 / 4	Steady	0 (0.0%)	0 / 12

↓
2	3	7

== Ward results ==
=== Bollin ===
Bollin
Party	Candidate	Votes	%	±%
Conservative	R. W. Gurney*	uncontested		
Conservative hold		Swing		

=== Central ===
Central
Party	Candidate	Votes	%	±%
Conservative	B. S. Hall*	uncontested		
Conservative hold		Swing		

=== North ===
North
Party	Candidate	Votes	%	±%
Liberal	E. Wilkinson*	1,108	75.4	+43.8
Labour	J. Cope	361	24.6	−5.8
Majority		747	50.8	
Turnout		1,469	50.1	−13.4
Liberal hold		Swing		

=== Wellgreen ===
Wellgreen
Party	Candidate	Votes	%	±%
Residents	A. Fielding	887	52.7	−9.2
Conservative	A. M. Hanrahan	796	47.3	+9.2
Majority		91	5.4	−18.4
Turnout		1,683	64.4	+1.3
Residents gain from Conservative		Swing		
