= 1961 Hale Urban District Council election =

Local election in Cheshire, England

← 1960	13 May 1961	1962 →

4 of 12 seats to Hale Urban District Council 6 seats needed for a majority
	First party	Second party
Party	Conservative	Liberal
Last election	2 seats, 47.2%	1 seats, 52.8%
Seats before	9	3
Seats won	3	1
Seats after	9	3
Seat change	Steady	Steady
Popular vote	595	903
Percentage	39.7%	60.3%
Swing	▼7.5%	▲7.5%
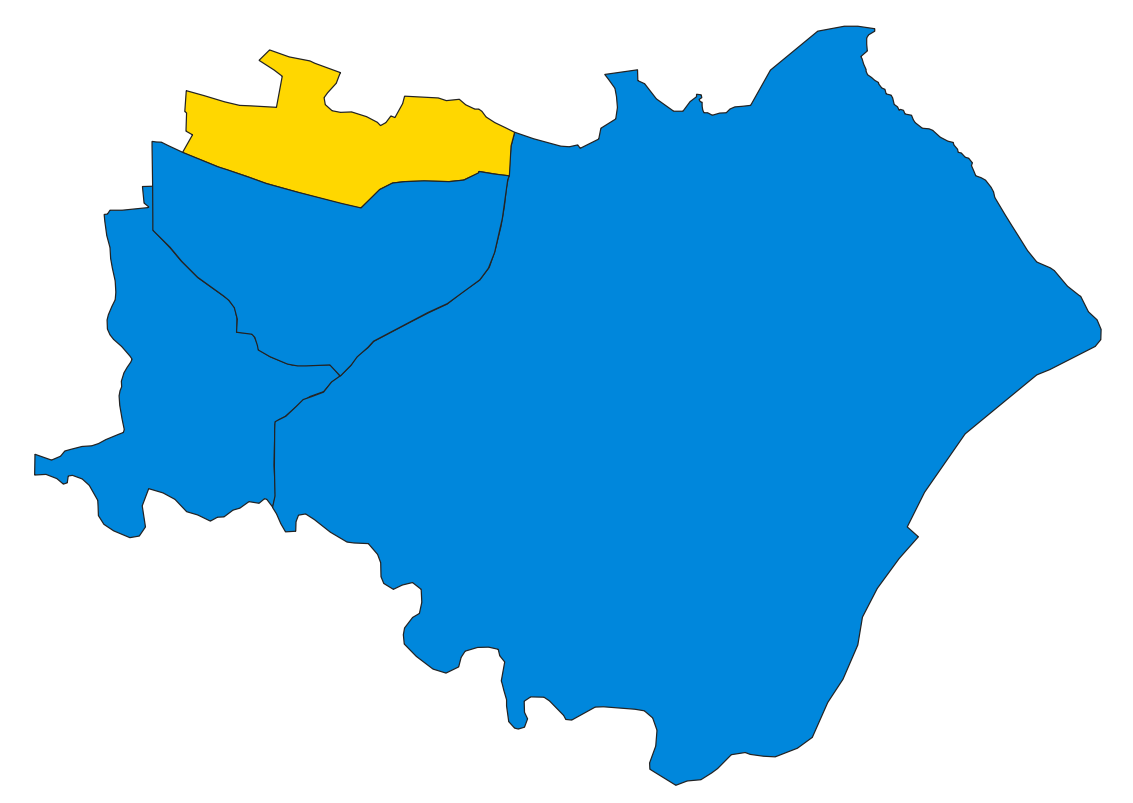
- Map of results of 1961 election
Leader of the Council before election
Conservative
Leader of the Council after election
Conservative

Elections to Hale Council were held on Saturday, 13 May 1961. One third of the councillors were up for election, with each successful candidate to serve a three-year term of office. The Conservative Party retained overall control of the council.

== Election result ==
Party	Votes		Seats			Full Council	
Conservative Party	595 (39.7%)	▼7.5	3 (75.0%)	3 / 4	Steady	8 (75.0%)	9 / 12
Liberal Party	903 (60.3%)	▲7.5	1 (25.0%)	1 / 4	Steady	3 (25.0%)	3 / 12

↓
3	9

== Ward results ==
=== Central ===
Central
Party	Candidate	Votes	%	±%
Conservative	J. S. Pickles*	uncontested		
Conservative hold		Swing		

=== North ===
North
Party	Candidate	Votes	%	±%
Liberal	E. P. Atkin*	903	60.3	+7.5
Conservative	B. S. Hall	595	39.7	−7.5
Majority		308	20.6	+15.0
Turnout		1,498		
Liberal hold		Swing		

=== South East ===
South East
Party	Candidate	Votes	%	±%
Conservative	J. Coates*	uncontested		
Conservative hold		Swing		

=== West ===
West
Party	Candidate	Votes	%	±%
Conservative	W. A. Sawyer*	uncontested		
Conservative hold		Swing		
