= 1968 Hale Urban District Council election =

Local election in Cheshire, England

← 1967	11 May 1968	1969 →

4 of 12 seats to Hale Urban District Council 6 seats needed for a majority
	First party	Second party	Third party
Party	Conservative	Residents	Liberal
Last election	3 seats, 46.0%	1 seats, 0.0%	0 seats, 42.8%
Seats before	7	3	2
Seats won	2	1	1
Seats after	7	3	2
Seat change	Steady	Steady	Steady
Popular vote	3,867	895	1,917
Percentage	57.9%	13.4%	28.7%
Swing	▲11.9%	▲13.4%	▼14.1%
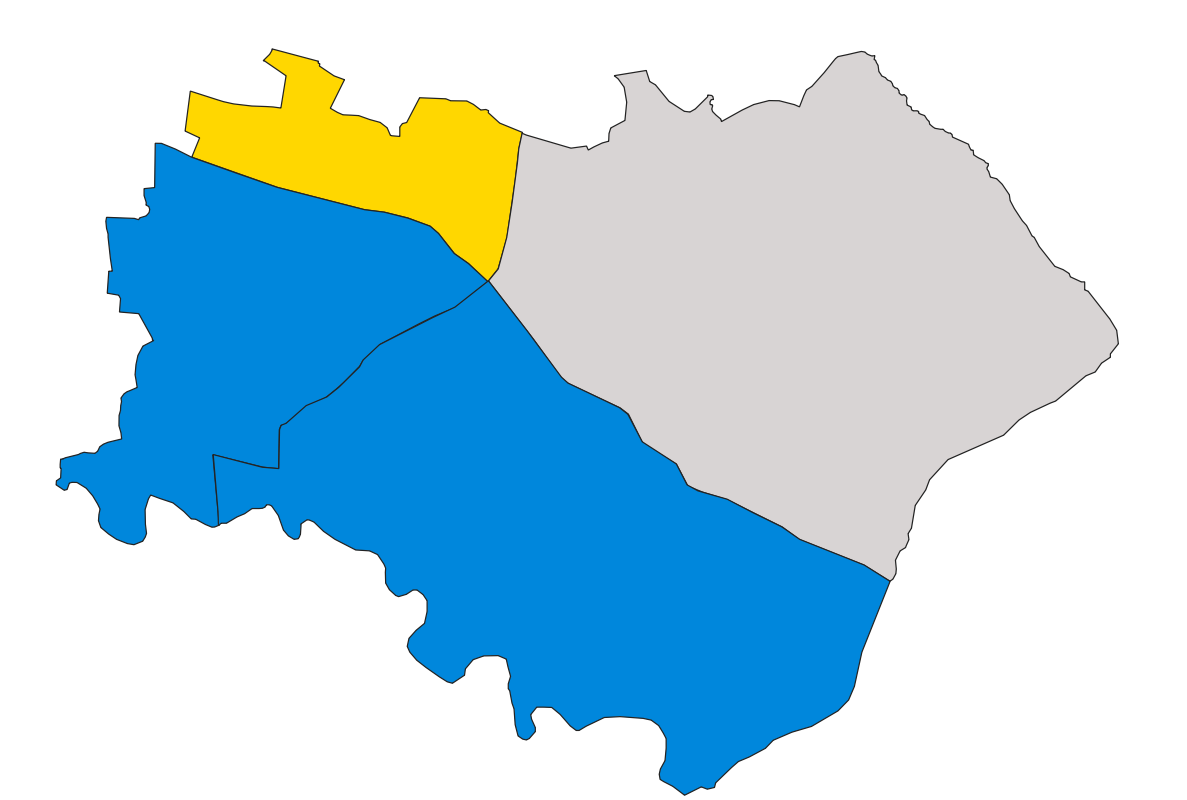
- Map of results of 1968 election
Leader of the Council before election
Conservative
Leader of the Council after election
Conservative

Elections to Hale Council were held on Saturday, 11 May 1968. One third of the councillors were up for election, with each successful candidate to serve a three-year term of office. The Conservative Party retained overall control of the council.

== Election result ==
Party	Votes		Seats			Full Council	
Conservative Party	3,867 (57.9%)	▲11.9	2 (50.0%)	2 / 4	Steady	7 (58.3%)	7 / 12
Residents	895 (13.4%)	▲13.4	1 (25.0%)	1 / 4	Steady	3 (25.0%)	3 / 12
Liberal Party	1,917 (28.7%)	▼14.1	1 (25.0%)	1 / 4	Steady	2 (16.7%)	2 / 12

↓
2	3	7

== Ward results ==
=== Bollin ===
Bollin
Party	Candidate	Votes	%	±%
Conservative	R. W. Gurney*	1,191	78.8	
Liberal	A. J. Wilding	321	21.2	
Majority		870	57.6	
Turnout		1,814	55.2	
Conservative hold		Swing		

=== Central ===
Central
Party	Candidate	Votes	%	±%
Conservative	B. S. Hall*	1,179	63.1	
Liberal	A. G. Taylor	689	36.9	
Majority		490	26.2	
Turnout		1,868	55.3	
Conservative hold		Swing		

=== North ===
North
Party	Candidate	Votes	%	±%
Liberal	E. Wilkinson*	907	53.9	+11.1
Conservative	A. Knott	775	46.1	+0.1
Majority		132	7.8	
Turnout		1,682	57.8	−5.4
Liberal hold		Swing		

=== Wellgreen ===
Wellgreen
Party	Candidate	Votes	%	±%
Residents	A. Fielding*	895	55.3	
Conservative	D. Shearer	722	44.7	
Majority		173	10.7	
Turnout		1,617	60.4	
Residents hold		Swing		
