= 1971 Hale Urban District Council election =

Local election in Cheshire, England

← 1970	15 May 1971	1972 →

4 of 12 seats to Hale Urban District Council 6 seats needed for a majority
	First party	Second party
Party	Conservative	Liberal
Last election	2 seats, 46.8%	2 seats, 37.2%
Seats before	7	4
Seats won	3	1
Seats after	8	4
Seat change	▲1	Steady
Popular vote	1,953	1,457
Percentage	57.3%	42.7%
Swing	▲10.5%	▲5.5%
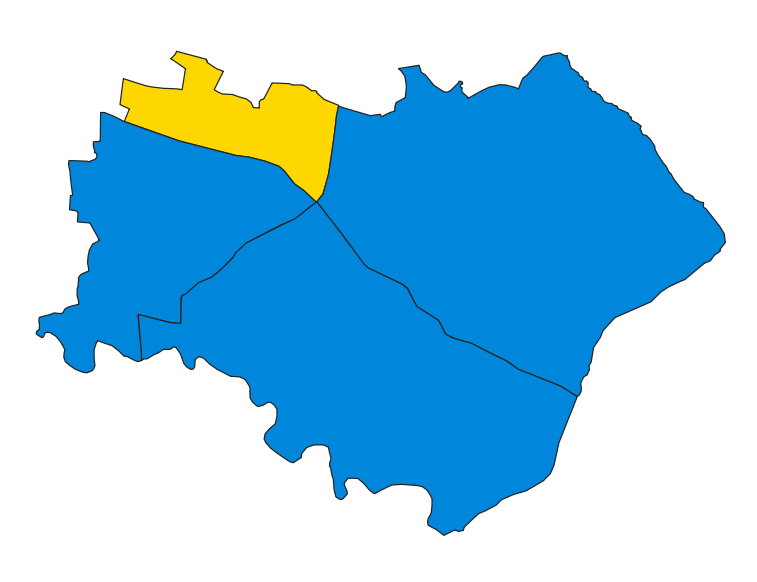
- Map of results of 1971 election
Leader of the Council before election
Conservative
Leader of the Council after election
Conservative

Elections to Hale Council were held on Saturday, 15 May 1971. One third of the councillors were up for election, with each successful candidate to serve a three-year term of office. The Conservative Party retained overall control of the council.

== Election result ==
Party	Votes		Seats			Full Council	
Conservative Party	1,953 (57.3%)	▲10.5	3 (75.0%)	3 / 4	▲1	8 (66.7%)	8 / 12
Liberal Party	1,457 (42.7%)	▲5.5	1 (25.0%)	1 / 4	Steady	4 (33.3%)	4 / 12

↓
4	8

== Ward results ==
=== Bollin ===
Bollin
Party	Candidate	Votes	%	±%
Conservative	M. E. Peddie*	uncontested		
Conservative hold		Swing		

=== Central ===
Central
Party	Candidate	Votes	%	±%
Conservative	B. S. Hall*	989	52.5	+6.7
Liberal	D. F. Mardon	896	47.5	−6.7
Majority		93	5.0	
Turnout		1,885	54.2	−1.6
Conservative hold		Swing		

=== North ===
North
Party	Candidate	Votes	%	±%
Liberal	E. Wilkinson*	uncontested		
Liberal hold		Swing		

=== Wellgreen ===
Wellgreen
Party	Candidate	Votes	%	±%
Conservative	B. H. Adams	964	63.2	+11.7
Liberal	C. G. Ball	561	36.8	N/A
Majority		403	26.4	+23.4
Turnout		1,525	51.3	−10.7
Conservative gain from Residents		Swing		
