= Listed buildings in Cardiff =

Protected buildings in Cardiff, Wales

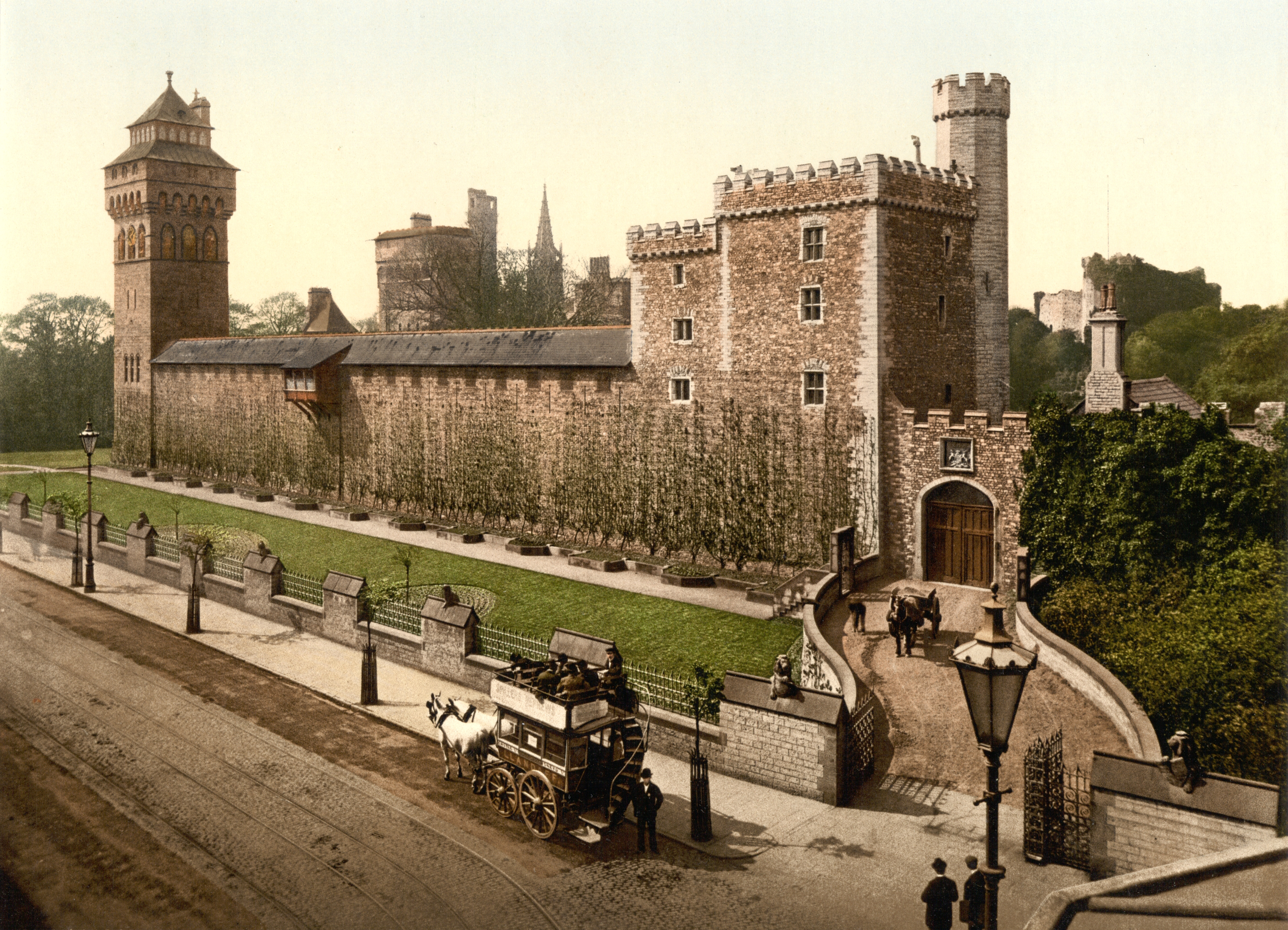
The Grade I listed Cardiff Castle and Animal Wall c. 1890s

There are around 1,000 listed buildings in Cardiff, the capital city of Wales. A listed building is one considered to be of special architectural, historical or cultural significance, which is protected from being demolished, extended or altered, unless special permission is granted by the relevant planning authorities. The Welsh Government makes decisions on individual cases, taking advice from the heritage agency Cadw, the Royal Commission on the Ancient and Historical Monuments of Wales and local councils.

== Key ==
Grade	Criteria
Grade I	Buildings of exceptional, usually national, interest (generally the top 2 per cent).
Grade II*	Particularly important buildings of more than special interest.
Grade II	Buildings of special interest, which warrant every effort being made to preserve them.

Because of the way in which buildings are listed and the large number of listed buildings within the city, they have been subdivided into Grade I, II* and II buildings, with the Grade II buildings being further split up by area.

== Grade I listed buildings ==
Name	Photograph	Completed	Date Listed	Function	Location	Grid Ref. (Note: Sometimes known as OSGB36, the grid reference is based on the British national grid reference system used by the Ordnance Survey.) Geo-coordinates	Description	HB Number (Note: The "HB Number" is a unique number assigned to each listed building by Cadw.)	Ref.
Animal Wall, and Gates near Clock Tower	Animal Wall, and Gates near Clock Tower More images	1890	1952	Park Wall	Castle Quarter	ST1794576460; 51°28′52″N 3°10′59″W	Designed by William Burges and constructed after his death by his assistant, William Frame. The Wall was moved from the front of Cardiff Castle to its current location in 1922.	21696	
Cardiff Castle	Cardiff Castle More images	1081–927	1952	Castle Wall and Lodge	Castle Quarter	ST1807376595; 51°28′57″N 3°10′52″W	Built on the foundations of a Roman fort (a small part of the Roman wall of white bricks remains visible at the south-east corner) the above ground construction mostly dates from the Norman period to the late 19th century. A Motte was built by Robert Fitzhamon in 1081 followed by a stone Bailey in the 12th century. Gilbert de Clare built the Black Tower at the south entrance during the 13th century. Much of the remaining castle and walls were constructed or redecorated by the Earls and Marquises of Bute between 1778 and the 1890s in a fantasy gothic style.	13662	
Cardiff Crown Court	Cardiff Crown Court More images	1906	1966	Law Courts	Cathays Park	ST1814376839; 51°29′04″N 3°10′49″W		13736	
Castell Coch	Castell Coch More images	1871–??	1963	Castle	Tongwynlais	ST1306182631; 51°32′09″N 3°15′18″W	Fantasy castle designed by William Burges and built on the ruins of an original 13th-century castle.	13644	
City Hall	City Hall More images	1906	1966	City Hall	Cathays Park	ST1824876911; 51°29′07″N 3°10′44″W		13744	
Former Glamorgan County Hall	Former Glamorgan County Hall More images	1912	1966	County Hall	Cathays Park	ST1805176988; 51°29′09″N 3°10′54″W		13738	
Llandaff Cathedral	Llandaff Cathedral More images	1120–1869	1952	Cathedral	Llandaff	ST1555478123; 51°29′45″N 3°13′04″W		13710	
National Museum Cardiff	National Museum Cardiff More images	1913–27	1966	Museum	Cathays Park	ST1833676985; 51°29′09″N 3°10′39″W	A Beaux-Arts design by the architects Arnold Dunbar Smith and Cecil Brewer. The building as it stands is a truncated version of a scheme they proposed in 1910; the west wing largely following the original design was built in 1962–65 by T. Alwyn Lloyd & Gordon. The remaining space was filled in 1993 by the Alex Gordon Partnership.	13694	
Park House	Park House More images	1874	1966	House	Castle Quarter	ST1847076874; 51°29′06″N 3°10′32″W	Designed by William Burges in the French Gothic style, for the Marquis of Bute's chief engineer, James McConnochie.	13772	
Pierhead Building	Pierhead Building More images	1897	1975	Pier Head Building	Butetown	ST1927574484; 51°27′49″N 3°09′48″W		14055	
Bishop's Palace, Llandaff	Bishop's Palace, Llandaff More images	c. 1266	1975	Bishops Palace Ruins	Llandaff	ST1557477991; 51°29′40″N 3°13′03″W	An impressive gatehouse and courtyard (now a garden) remains. The Palace was possibly built during the time of Bishop William de Braose. It has similarities to the contemporary Caerphilly Castle.	13718	
St John the Baptist Church	St John the Baptist Church More images	c. 1460	1952	Church	Castle Quarter	ST1827076411; 51°28′51″N 3°10′42″W		13674	
St Fagans Castle	St Fagans Castle More images	c. 1590s	1977	Museum	St Fagans	ST1199077145; 51°29′11″N 3°16′08″W	Multi-gabled Elizabethan house, built before 1596. Its grounds are now used as the St Fagans National History Museum.	13888	
St German's Church	St German's Church More images	1884	1952	Church	Adamsdown	ST1958376820; 51°29′05″N 3°09′34″W	Designed by London architects Bodley & Garner this "tall, spacious and elegant" church also has a contemporary school house.	13806	
St Margaret's Church	St Margaret's Church More images	1870	1975	Church	Penylan	ST1993077740; 51°29′35″N 3°09′17″W	Designed by John Prichard at the behest of the Third Marquess of Bute, this church replaced an ancient chapel on the same site. It includes the Marquess's family mausoleum.	13819	
St Mellons Church	St Mellons Church More images	c. 13th century	1963	Church	Old St Mellons	ST2283581404; 51°31′35″N 3°06′49″W		13865	
St Padarn's Institute Chapel	St Padarn's Institute Chapel More images	1959	2004	Chapel	Llandaff	ST1549777752; 51°29′33″N 3°13′07″W		82676	

== Grade II* listed buildings ==
Name	Photograph	Completed	Date Listed	Function	Location	Grid Ref. Geo-coordinates	Description	HB Number	Ref.
Cardiff Bay railway station	Cardiff Bay railway station More images	1840	1975	Railway Station	Butetown	ST1907074875; 51°28′01″N 3°09′59″W		13963	
Cardiff Central Market	Cardiff Central Market More images	1891	1975	Market hall	Castle Quarter	ST1825476350; 51°28′49″N 3°10′43″W		13811	
Coal Exchange	Coal Exchange More images	1886	1975	Exchange Building	Butetown	ST1894374698; 51°27′56″N 3°10′06″W		14015	
Castell-y-mynach	Castell-y-mynach More images	Late medieval	1952	Manor house	Creigiau	ST0820681065; 51°31′16″N 3°19′28″W		13517	
Castle Arcade (See also Castle Arcade Entrance Block)	Castle Arcade (See also Castle Arcade Entrance Block) More images	1887	1975	Shopping Arcade	Castle Quarter	ST1808676400; 51°28′50″N 3°10′52″W		13661	
Cathays Library	Cathays Library More images	1907	1975	Library	Cathays	ST1803678267; 51°29′51″N 3°10′56″W	A Carnegie library designed by Cardiff architects, Speir & Bevan. The building is in an Arts and Crafts style and has an unusual butterfly plan.	13681	
St Mary's Church	St Mary's Church More images		1963	Church	St Fagans	ST1211877222; 51°29′14″N 3°16′02″W		13871	
City United Reformed Church	City United Reformed Church More images	1866/1893	1975	Chapel	Castle Quarter	ST1865276754; 51°29′02″N 3°10′22″W	Church rebuilt and enlarged in 1892/3, with an integral tower. Still used as a church.	13831	
Craig-y-parc House	Craig-y-parc House More images	1914–1918	2000	House	Pentyrch	ST0960280838; 51°31′09″N 3°18′15″W		22816	
Craig-y-parc House Garden terrace and steps	Upload Photo	c. 1915	2000	Terrace	Pentyrch	ST0959880815; 51°31′08″N 3°18′16″W		22818	
Craig-y-parc House Loggia and attached terrace walls and steps	Upload Photo	c. 1915	2000	Loggia	Pentyrch	ST0963780820; 51°31′09″N 3°18′13″W		22817	
Empire House	Empire House More images		1991	Residential	Butetown	ST1898174750; 51°27′57″N 3°10′04″W		14007	
Entrance Block to Castle Arcade (See also Castle Arcade)	Entrance Block to Castle Arcade (See also Castle Arcade) More images	1882	1999	Shopping arcade	Castle Quarter	ST1813276398; 51°28′50″N 3°10′49″W	Built as the Albert Chambers by Peter Price, the entrance block pre-dates the arcade behind by five years.	21712	
Old Library	Old Library More images	1882	1978	Museum, Information Centre and Welsh language Centre	Castle Quarter	ST1834176341; 51°28′48″N 3°10′38″W	Designed by architects James, Seward & Thomas, the building became the Central Library in 1896. Includes stained glass throughout and an entrance hall decorated with tiles.	14111	
Gelynis Farmhouse and attached cottage and stable	Gelynis Farmhouse and attached cottage and stable More images		1977	Farmhouse and cottage	Radyr	ST1306181630; 51°31′37″N 3°15′17″W		13912	
James Howell and Co.	James Howell and Co. More images	1928–30	1988	Department store	Castle Quarter	ST1827976306; 51°28′47″N 3°10′41″W	Designed by Sir Percy Thomas. The Beaux-Arts-style building was awarded the RIBA Bronze Medal in 1930.	14109	
Howell's School Llandaff, Original Building with Big Hall	Howell's School Llandaff, Original Building with Big Hall More images	1858–59	1975	School	Llandaff	ST1592577520; 51°29′25″N 3°12′44″W	Designed by Herbert Williams (after Decimus Burton withdrew from the commission).	13660	
Insole Court	Insole Court More images		1992	House	Llandaff	ST1504277720; 51°29′31″N 3°13′30″W		14127	
Lead Cistern in the east forecourt of St Fagans Castle	Lead Cistern in the east forecourt of St Fagans Castle More images		1977	Cistern	St Fagans	ST1201677150; 51°29′11″N 3°16′07″W		13885	
Llanfair-fach House	Upload Photo		1995	House	St Fagans	ST0983579242; 51°30′18″N 3°18′02″W		11707	
Llanrumney Hall	Llanrumney Hall More images		1975	Public House	Llanrumney	ST2171580975; 51°31′20″N 3°07′47″W		13646	
Portland House	Portland House More images	1927	1966	Bank	Butetown	ST1907274705; 51°27′56″N 3°09′59″W		13974	
New House Hotel	New House Hotel More images	c. 1795	1977	House	Thornhill	ST1600084133; 51°32′59″N 3°12′46″W		13937	
Old Leckwith Bridge (partly in the Michaelston community)	Old Leckwith Bridge (partly in the Michaelston community) More images	16th century	1952	Bridge	Canton, Michaelston-y-Fedw	ST1591175248; 51°28′12″N 3°12′43″W	A three-arched stone bridge with parapet refuges, spanning the River Ely. It dates from before 1536.	13748	
Pencoed House	Upload Photo		1963	Farmhouse	Pentyrch	ST0922779861; 51°30′37″N 3°18′34″W		13608	
South African War Memorial	South African War Memorial More images	1909	1966	War Memorial	Cathays Park	ST1822276831; 51°29′04″N 3°10′45″W	Designed by sculptor Albert Toft and described as "undoubtedly the finest and most original work of sculpture" in Cathays Park.	13745	
St Andrews United Reformed Church	St Andrews United Reformed Church More images	1900	1975	Chapel	Penylan	ST1926378085; 51°29′45″N 3°09′52″W		13753	
St Augustine's Church	St Augustine's Church More images	1108	1975	Church	Rumney	ST2143279116; 51°30′20″N 3°08′00″W		13672	
St Denys Church	St Denys Church More images	12th century	1963	Church	Lisvane	ST1915083059; 51°32′26″N 3°10′02″W		13867	
St Edeyrn's Church	St Edeyrn's Church More images		1963	Church	Old St Mellons	ST2205781988; 51°31′53″N 3°07′30″W		13868	
St Isan's Church	St Isan's Church More images	11th Century	1952	Church	Llanishen	ST1762781836; 51°31′46″N 3°11′20″W		13726	
St John's College (formerly Ty-to-Maen)	St John's College (formerly Ty-to-Maen) More images		1977	School	Old St Mellons	ST2304881624; 51°31′42″N 3°06′38″W		13941	
St Peter's Church	St Peter's Church More images	1861	1975	Church	Roath	ST1897077073; 51°29′12″N 3°10′06″W		13805	
Stables to Cardiff Castle in Bute Park	Stables to Cardiff Castle in Bute Park More images		1966	Stables	Castle Quarter	ST1792676916; 51°29′07″N 3°11′00″W		13764	
Tabernacle Chapel including attached Hall and forecourt railings	Tabernacle Chapel including attached Hall and forecourt railings More images	1865	1975	Chapel	Castle Quarter	ST1841676164; 51°28′43″N 3°10′34″W	Designed by John Hartland and built in 1865 in only six months, described as "one of the finest chapels and most original of the period".	13722	
The Cathedral School	The Cathedral School More images	1744–51	1952	School	Llandaff	ST1567677885; 51°29′37″N 3°12′58″W	The main building was built as Llandaff Court, the seat of Admiral Thomas Mathews, on the site of the ancient manor house of Bryn-y-Gynnon. Its architect was probably John Wood, who was engaged on the restoration of Llandaff Cathedral at the time of the house's construction.	13654	
Old Probate Registry, Llandaff	Old Probate Registry, Llandaff More images		1975	Probate Registry	Llandaff	ST1546377863; 51°29′36″N 3°13′09″W	Formerly the national probate office of Wales. By John Prichard and described by Cadw as "possibly his finest secular design"	13648	
The Old Rectory	The Old Rectory More images		1977	House	St Fagans	ST1214277401; 51°29′19″N 3°16′00″W	Designed by architects John Prichard and John Pollard Seddon.	13902	
University of Wales, Cardiff, including Forecourt Walls	University of Wales, Cardiff, including Forecourt Walls More images	1883	1966	University Building	Cathays Park	ST1820877168; 51°29′15″N 3°10′46″W		13757	
Welsh National War Memorial	Welsh National War Memorial More images	1928	1966	War Memorial	Cathays Park	ST1813677063; 51°29′12″N 3°10′49″W		13742	
West Lodge to Cardiff Castle, including attached Walls & Gateway	West Lodge to Cardiff Castle, including attached Walls & Gateway More images	1863	1952	Lodge	Castle Quarter	ST1783776465; 51°28′52″N 3°11′04″W	Designed by Alexander Roos to the west of Cardiff Castle as a decorative gatehouse to the estate of the Marquess of Bute. Converted into tea-rooms in 2012, retaining the original Victorian floor tiles.	21697	

== Grade II listed buildings ==
=== Caerau ===
Name	Location Grid Ref. (Note: Sometimes known as OSGB36, the grid reference is based on the British national grid reference system used by the Ordnance Survey.) Geo-coordinates	Date Listed	Function	Notes	Reference Number	Image
Church of St. Francis of Assisi RC	On the corner of Cowbridge Road West and Caerau Park Road; 51°28′27″N 3°15′11″W	2004	Roman Catholic church	Built in 1960 to designs by F. R. Bates Son and Price, exterior features a concrete sculpture by Adam Kossowski of St. Francis's vision of Christ on the Cross.	82629	See more images
Church of St. Mary	On the north eastern side of Caerau Hillfort; 51°28′04″N 3°14′48″W	1980	Church	Ruined possibly 13th century medieval church restored c.1885 by John Prichard, the diocesan architect of Llandaff.	13406	Church of St. Mary
Ely Methodist Church	On the corner of Cowbridge Road West and Colin Road; 51°28′57″N 3°14′01″W	1999	Methodist church	Built 1911 in a free gothic style with Arts and Crafts influences	21571	Ely Methodist Church

=== Canton ===
Name	Photograph	Date	Location	Description
The Corporation, Cowbridge Road East	Bute Building	1889	51.4814°N 3.2010°W	A generous two-storey public house with a four-storey tower, on a prominent corner of Canton. Dating from 1889 and built on Cardiff Corporation land, hence the name.
St John the Evangelist Church, St John's Crescent	St John the Evangelist	1854	51.4799°N 3.2012°W	The Church in Wales parish church for Canton, designed by architects John Prichard and John Pollard Seddon in a Gothic Revival style. The aisles were added a few years later and the steeple from 1868 to 1870. Listed in 1975.
St Mary of the Angels Church, Kings Road /Hamilton Street	St Mary of the Angels	1907	51.4825°N 3.1950°W	A Roman Catholic church designed by Frederick Walters, with the tower added in 1916. Listed as "a very good Roman Catholic church designed by a notable Edwardian architect".

=== City centre ===
Name	Photograph	Date	Location	Description
Bute Building, King Edward VII Avenue	Bute Building	1916	51.48652°N 3.18264°W	Designed by Percy Thomas and Ivor Davies and opened in 1916 as Cardiff Technical College.
Central Station, Central Square	Central Station	1930	51.4752°N 3.1779°W	Considered "the most complete 1930s Great Western Railway station still in existence".
Eglwys Dewi Sant, St Andrew's Crescent	Eglwys Dewi Sant	1863	51.4851°N 3.1752°W	Originally designed by architects Prichard & Seddon, but completed to a simpler design. Later additions by William Butterfield.
Golden Cross public house, Bute Terrace	Golden Cross	c. 1890s	51.4766°N 3.1732°W	Late 19th-century public house, tiled in green and gold. Important interior with decorative tiling and engraved glass.
Hayes Island Snack Bar, The Hayes	Hayes Island Snack Bar	1911	51.4794°N 3.1756°W	Originally opened as a parcels office.
New Theatre, Greyfriars Road	New Theatre	1906	51.48366°N 3.17553°W	Designed by architects Runtz and Ford, with a facade of Bath stone and brick.
Old Custom House, Bute Terrace	Old Custom House	c. 1845	51.4764°N 3.1757°W	Two-storey five-bay building, originally sited next to the Glamorganshire Canal. Listed for its importance to Cardiff's commercial history. Demolished by developers in early 2019, with only the facade wall retained.
Parc Hotel, Queen Street	Parc Hotel	c. 1884	51.4824°N 3.1729°W	
Prince of Wales Theatre, Wood Street and St Mary Street	New Theatre	1878	51.47750°N 3.17790°W	Built to a Venetian Gothic design by W. D. Bleasley and T. Waring. Later remodelled in a Greek Revival style by Willmott & Smith. Now a pub.
Royal Hotel, St Mary Street	Royal Hotel	1866	51.4777°N 3.1774°W	
Water Tower at Cardiff Central railway station	Water Tower	1932	51.4755°N 3.1804°W	Great Western Railway water tower, 15 metres in height, built in concrete with a fluted base. In 1984 it was embellished with a painted design of giant daffodils. It was repainted in cream and beige, the colours of the GWR, in 2012.

=== Ely ===
Name	Location Grid Ref. (Note: Sometimes known as OSGB36, the grid reference is based on the British national grid reference system used by the Ordnance Survey.) Geo-coordinates	Date Listed	Function	Notes	Reference Number	Image
Church of the Resurrection, Ely	Grand Avenue, Ely; 51°28′44″N 3°14′57″W	2001	Church in Wales church building	Completed in the 1930s, designed in the Byzantine style in rich brown brick. The church was designed by T. Roderick of Aberdare and provided at a cost of £10,000 by Lord Glanely in memory of his wife, Ada. Design inspired by the Community of the Resurrection in Mirfield, West Yorkshire, by Walter Tapper.	25795	Church of the Resurrection, Ely
Milepost outside No 322	On Cowbridge Road West, south west of the junction with Crossways Road; 51°28′35″N 3°14′50″W	1976	Mile post	A cast-iron Gothic style mile post dating from 1835. One of a number of mileposts to the west of Cardiff on the A48. Inscribed 'LANDAFF PARISH' on a rectangular panel, with 'CARDIFF DISTRICT' inscribed on the top. Left hand panel inscribed 'TO CARDIFF 3', right hand side inscribed 'TO COWBRIDGE 9'. 'LONDON 161' inscribed at base.	14084	Milepost outside No 322
Milepost outside the Western Cemetery	On Cowbridge Road West, opposite Knightswell Road, near the main entrance of the Western Cemetery; 51°28′06″N 3°15′57″W	1976	Mile post	A cast-iron Gothic style mile post dating from 1835. One of a number of mileposts to the west of Cardiff on the A48. Inscribed 'MICHAELSTONE PARISH' on a rectangular panel, with 'CARDIFF DISTRICT' inscribed on the top. Left hand panel inscribed 'TO CARDIFF 4', right hand side inscribed 'TO COWBRIDGE 8'. 'LONDON 162' inscribed at base.	14083	Milepost outside the Western Cemetery

=== Flat Holm (Island) ===
Name	Photograph	Date	Location	Description
Foghorn Station, Flat Holm	Foghorn Station	1906	51.3776°N 3.1174°W	Built by the Trinity House lighthouse authority and in use as a fog warning until 1988.
Isolation Hospital (ruins), Flat Holm	Isolation Hospital	1896	51.3772°N 3.1210°W	A unique offshore Isolation Hospital for cholera patients, built in single storey red brick and closed in 1935.

=== Gabalfa ===
Name	Photograph	Date	Location	Description
Allensbank Primary School, Llanishen Street	Allensbank Primary School	1904	51.5016°N 3.1854°W	Designed by Veall and Sant and opened in 1904
Park Lodge, Bute Park	Park Lodge	1872–73	51.4811°N 3.1846°W	Built 1872–73 for the 3rd Marquess of Bute as the north lodge of Cardiff Castle park and probably designed by Charles Rigg

=== Heath ===
Name	Photograph	Date	Location	Description
The Cross Inn (now known as The Aneurin Bevan), Caerphilly Road	The Aneurin Bevan	1994	51.5077°N 3.1999°W	Listed as "a well-detailed public house in the Queen Ann revival style".

=== Lisvane ===
Name	Photograph	Date	Location	Description
Carn Ingli, Lisvane Road (Carn Ingli is house on the left in image)	Carn Ingli is on the left, Cerrig Llwyd is on the right	1931	51.5395°N 3.1669°W	Datestone 1931 and inscription JET, denotes builder as J E Turner trading as E Turner and Sons.
Cerrig Llwyd, Lisvane Road (Cerrig Llwyd is house on the right in image)	Carn Ingli is on the left, Cerrig Llwyd is on the right	1931	51.5395°N 3.1669°W	Datestone 1931 and inscription JET, denotes builder as J E Turner trading as E Turner and Sons.
Lisvane Baptist Chapel, Rudry Road	The former Lisvane Baptist Chapel	1858	51.5503°N 3.1615°W	Of important architectural interest as a plain country chapel from the mid 19th century on an earlier site.
Outdoor Baptistry by Lisvane Baptist Chapel, Rudry Road	The former Lisvane Baptist Chapel	c.1841	51.5503°N 3.1615°W	Included as an unusual surviving outdoor baptistery.

=== Llandaff ===
Name	Photograph	Date	Location	Description
St Andrew		Built 1859-61	51.49443°N 3.2182°W	Included as an unaltered design by Ewan Christian and for its group value with the other listed buildings around The Cathedral Green and on the High Street.
St Cross		Built 1859-61	51.49426°N 3.21833°W	Included as an unaltered design by Ewan Christian and for its group value with the other listed buildings around The Cathedral Green and on the High Street.
St Padarn's Institute (Formerly St Michael's College)	Stone-built property	Built 1880-1907	51.4929°N 3.2189°W	Begun as a house for himself by John Prichard. Expanded as a theological college from 1905-1907 by Frederick Robertson Kempson.
Apartments 1-3 St Michael's College (now St Padarn's Institute)		Built 1920	51.4927°N 3.2183°W	A later addition to St Padarn's Institute of 1920 by Frederick Robertson Kempson.
6 High Street	Stone-built property	Probably 18th century	51.4946°N 3.2184°W	Included as a largely 18th-century house and for its group value with the other listed buildings around The Cathedral Green and on the High Street. Now in commercial use as a teahouse
19 High Street	Stone-built property	Probably mid-19th century	51.49383°N 3.2189°W	Included as a largely 18th-century house and for its group value with the other listed buildings around The Cathedral Green and on the High Street.

=== Llandaff North ===
Name	Location Grid Ref. (Note: Sometimes known as OSGB36, the grid reference is based on the British national grid reference system used by the Ordnance Survey.) Geo-coordinates	Date Listed	Function	Notes	Reference Number	Image
Afon Taff Viaduct	Over the River Taff on the Cardiff-Merthyr line between Llandaff and Raydr stations 51°30′40″N 3°14′23″W	2004	Railway bridge	Built for the Taff Vale Railway in three stages and was designed by Isambard Kingdom Brunel from 1845 to 1850, subsequently widened.	82590	See more images

=== Pontprennau ===
Name	Location Grid Ref. (Note: Sometimes known as OSGB36, the grid reference is based on the British national grid reference system used by the Ordnance Survey.) Geo-coordinates	Date Listed	Function	Notes	Reference Number	Image
Glan-y-nant	Graig Llwyn Road; 51°32′50″N 3°09′17″W	1977	House	A small two storey thatched house probably dating from the 18th century with a 20th-century extension at the rear.	13861	Glan-y-nant
Pant-teg (aka Panteg)	off St. Mellons Road; 51°32′13″N 3°09′25″W	1977	Farmhouse	A traditional long farmhouse dating from the mid 17th century but remodelled and extended in the 18th or early 19th century.	13935	Upload Photo

=== Radyr ===
Name	Photograph	Date	Location	Description
Church of St. John the Baptist	Stone-built church in a churchyard	Probably 14th century	51.5038°N 3.2415°W	Medieval church, restored and altered c. 1885

=== Rhiwbina ===
Name	Location Grid Ref. (Note: Sometimes known as OSGB36, the grid reference is based on the British national grid reference system used by the Ordnance Survey.) Geo-coordinates	Date Listed	Function	Notes	Reference Number	Image
Briwnant Farmhouse and adjoining farm range	51°32′39″N 3°13′12″W	1975	Farmhouse	Small stone farmhouse, possibly 18th century, occasionally known as Briwnant Fawr.	13821	Upload Photo
Hafod Lwyd	11 Heol Wen, Rhiwbina Garden Village; 51°31′21″N 3°13′07″W	2001	House	Detached house, built by the architect Thomas Alwyn Lloyd for his own occupation c.1920. Faces Lon Isa from the west end of the garden village	25893	Hafod Lwyd
The Long Barn and attached courtyard wall, gates and railings	On farm track off Thornhill Road; 51°32′59″N 3°12′37″W	2001	Barn	Former 18th century long stable, barn, and coach house, now converted into housing	15758	The Long Barn and attached courtyard wall, gates and railings
Llanishen Fach	Heol Erwin, Rhiwbina; 51°31′55″N 3°12′31″W	1975	Farmhouse	Former farmhouse, white painted stone with slate roof. Built on site of older house associated with the Williams and Wyndham Lewis families.	13724	Llanishen Fach
Pantysgawen	On farm track off Thornhill Road; 51°32′36″N 3°12′37″W	1975	Farmhouse	Small single storey 17th or 18th century farmhouse.	13810	Upload Photo
Post Box opposite 27 Lon Isa	Lon Isa, Rhiwbina Garden Village; 51°31′23″N 3°12′57″W	2001	Postbox	Pillar box erected at the same period as the houses of the garden village; inscribed with the monogram of King George V and its manufacturer, the Carron Company of Stirlingshire.	25924	Post Box opposite 27 Lon Isa
Telephone box in Pen-y-dre adjacent to branch library	Opposite Rhiwbina Library on Pen-y-dre; 51°31′17″N 3°12′46″W	1989	Red telephone box	A K6 red telephone box designed by Giles Gilbert Scott. The design dates from 1936.	14120	Telephone box in Pen-y-dre adjacent to branch library
The Wendy House	Off Heol-y-deri to Y Groes, close to 16 Y Groes; 51°31′20″N 3°12′47″W	2001	Office	Small single storey building, originally used as offices. Plaques record the Rhiwbina Garden Village Conservation Area and the Rhiwbina Garden Village Residents Association.	25892	See more images

=== Roath ===
Name	Photograph	Date	Location	Description
Mansion House		1891	51.4862°N 3.1706°W	Built by James Howell, owner of Howells department store; later home to Cardiff's Lord Mayors.

=== Splott ===
Name	Photograph	Date	Location	Description
St. Alban-on-the-Moors Church		1911	51.4863°N 3.1495°W	Roman Catholic place of worship.

=== Whitchurch ===
Name	Photograph	Date	Location	Description
Bridge House, 88 Merthyr Road		c.1800		
Former Towpath Bridge to Glamorganshire Canal		Late 18th to mid 19th century	51.5119°N 3.2379°W	
Front wall, gate piers and gate of Bridge House, 88 Merthyr Road		c.1800		
Garden Wall, Privy and Gatepiers of Oak Cottage		Early 19th century		
St Mary's Church		1884	51.5133°N 3.2211°W	Anglican place of worship
The Laurels, 27 Penlline Road		Mid 19th century		Villa in Tudor style
Oak Cottage		17th to 19th century		
The Pines, Old Church Road		Early to mid 19th century		
Six Gables, 27A Penlline Road		Mid 19th century		
Tabernacle Chapel, Merthyr Road		1866		
Ty-Mawr, Ty Mawr Road		1583	51.5111°N 3.2359°W	One of the oldest houses in Glamorgan, substantially altered in the nineteenth century.
Whitchurch Hospital, Park Road		1908	51.51687°N 3.23184°W	A former mental hospital. The hospital chapel and six octagonal shelters in the grounds are separately listed as Grade II.
Whitchurch Library, Park Road		1904	51.5160°N 3.2254°W	A Carnegie Library designed by R and S Williams of Cardiff.
Whitchurch War Memorial, Park Road		c. 1920	51.5160°N 3.22513°W	Erected as a memorial to the dead of the Great War. Later inscription to commemorate the dead of World War II.

== See also ==
- Architecture of Cardiff
- List of Scheduled Monuments in Cardiff
- Listed buildings in Wales

== Sources ==
- Cardiff, Wales, BritishListedBuildings.co.uk
- Hilling, John B. (1973). Cardiff and the Valleys: Architecture and Townscape. London: Lund Humphries.
- Newman, John (1995). Glamorgan: Mid Glamorgan, South Glamorgan and West Glamorgan. The Buildings of Wales. London: Penguin. ISBN 0-14-071056-6.
