= Craig-y-parc House =

Country house in Cardiff, Wales

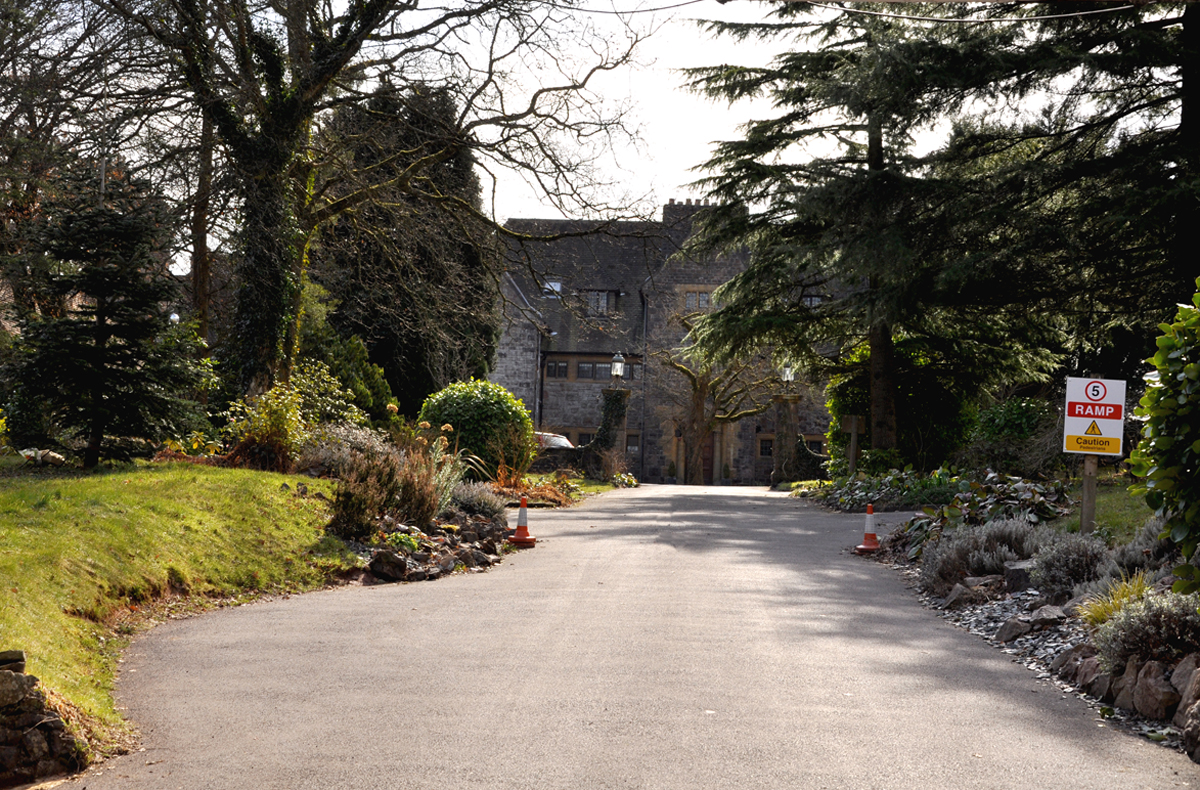
- "Under the spell of Lutyens, a beautifully resolved composition", John Newman

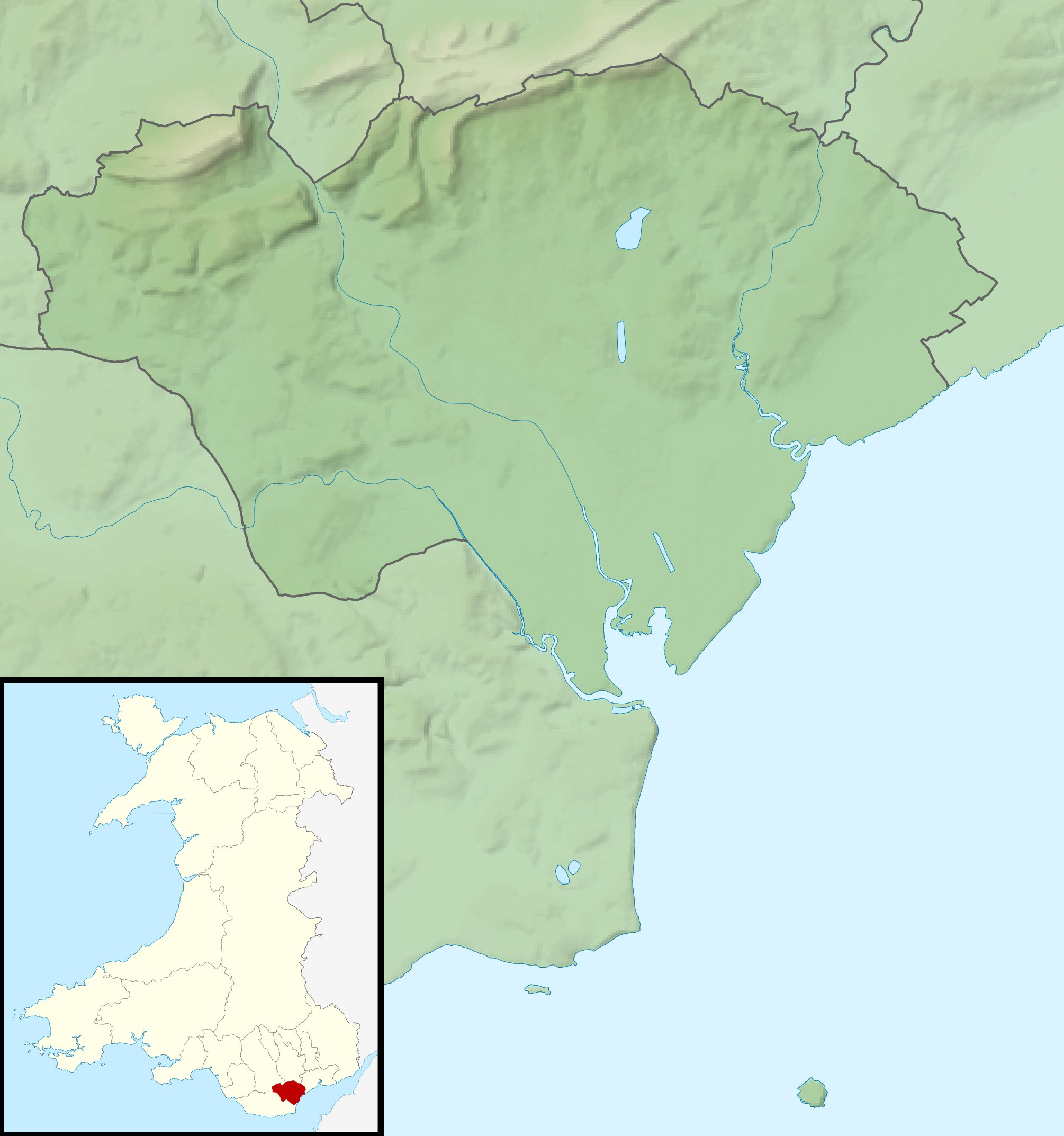
- Location within Cardiff
- 51.5192°N 3.3042°W
- Type: House
- Location: Cardiff, Glamorgan

History
- Built: 1914-1918

Site notes
- Architect: Charles Edward Mallows
- Architectural style: Arts and Crafts
- Governing body: Salutem Healthcare
- Owner: Thomas Evans

Cadw/ICOMOS Register of Parks and Gardens of Special Historic Interest in Wales
- Official name: Craig y Parc
- Designated: 1 February 2022; 4 years ago
- Reference no.: PGW(Gm)6(CDF)
- Listing: Grade II*

Listed Building – Grade II*
- Official name: Craig-y-parc House
- Designated: 31 January 2000
- Reference no.: 22816

Listed Building – Grade II*
- Official name: Loggia at Craig-y-parc and attached terrace walls and steps
- Designated: 31 January 2000
- Reference no.: 22817

Listed Building – Grade II*
- Official name: Garden terrace and steps at Craig-y-parc
- Designated: 31 January 2000
- Reference no.: 22818

Listed Building – Grade II
- Official name: Walls and gatepiers to courtyard entrance at Craig-y-parc
- Designated: 31 January 2000
- Reference no.: 22819

Craig-y-parc House is a country house in Pentyrch, Cardiff, Wales. Dating from 1914 to 1918, it was built for Thomas Evans, a colliery owner, by Charles Edward Mallows. The house reputedly cost £100,000. Craig-y-parc is a Grade II* listed building. The garden and park surrounding the house has its own Grade II* listing on the Cadw/ICOMOS Register of Parks and Gardens of Special Historic Interest in Wales, is a designated conservation area and contains a number of listed structures. The house now operates as a residential school for children and young adults with disabilities.

== History ==
Thomas Evans began his career as a railwayman. Known as "Small Coal Evans", he reputedly made his fortune by collecting coal that had fallen from coal trucks operating on the railways in the South Wales Coalfield. By 1940, he held a CBE, was the Chairman of the Cardiff Coal and Shipping Exchange, Vice-chairman of the Ocean Coal Company and a Justice of the peace for Glamorganshire. In 1914, Evans commissioned Charles Edward Mallows to build a house some seven miles north of Cardiff in woods close to the village of Pentyrch. Mallows, who died the year after work had begun, was an architect in the Arts and Crafts style, much influenced by Edwin Lutyens. His major work was Tirley Garth in Cheshire, another Lutyenseque house for another rich industrialist. Mallows also had full responsibility for the design of the gardens surrounding the house, which he laid out to an Arts and Crafts-influenced design. The whole reputedly cost Evans a sum in excess of £100,000.

Following Evans' death in 1943, Craig-y-parc came into the possession of the National Coal Board before being sold in 1954 to the Spastics Society which opened a residential school at the site in 1955. The school continues to provide residential care for children and young adults with disabilities, operated by Salutem Healthcare.

== Architecture and description ==
Craig-y-parc is a large mansion with the entrance front to the north, and the garden front, onto which all the main receptions rooms face, to the south. The architectural historian John Newman, in his Glamorgan volume of the Buildings of Wales, notes the strong influence of Lutyens. This is seen particularly in the lodge, and in the north frontage, which Newman compares to Little Thakeham. He admires Mallows' originality on the garden front, where a row of columns forms an arcade. The house is constructed of locally quarried stone, with granite dressings. The house is listed at Grade II*. The gardens are also listed at II*, on the Cadw/ICOMOS Register of Parks and Gardens of Special Historic Interest in Wales. The listing record notes their "strongly axial design" and considers them "a very good example of [an] architectural Edwardian garden". The loggia, and the garden terrace have their own Grade II* listings, while the lodge, and the walls and gate piers at the courtyard entrance are listed Grade II.

== Sources ==
- Newman, John (1995). Glamorgan. The Buildings of Wales. London, UK: Penguin Books. ISBN 978-0-140-71056-4. OCLC 33858574.
