= Ely Methodist Church =

Coordinates: 51°28′58″N 3°14′02″W

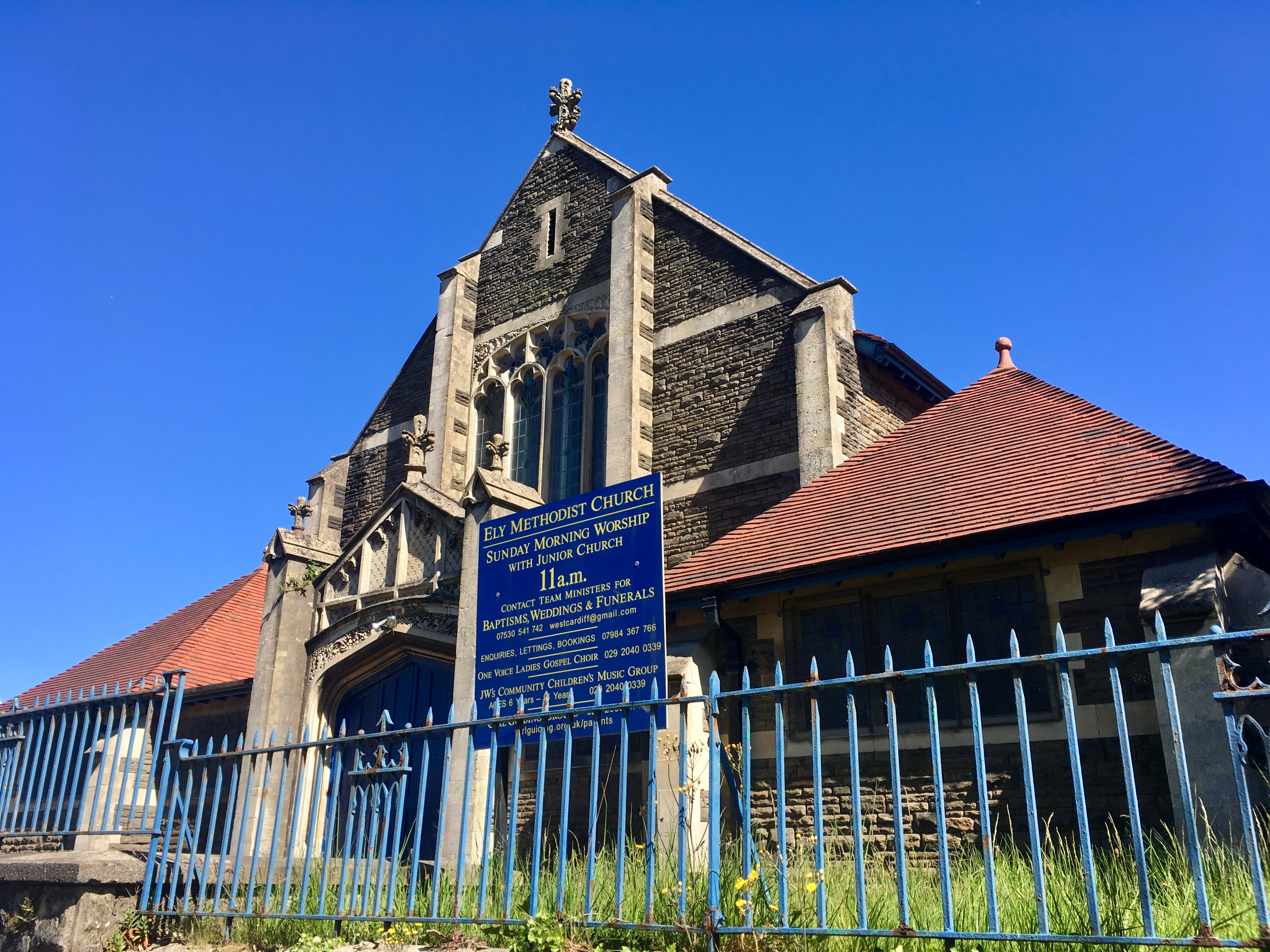
- Ely Methodist Church in Cardiff, Wales
- Ely Methodist Church
- Location: Ely, Cardiff
- Country: Wales
- Denomination: Methodist

History
- Status: Active

Architecture
- Style: Free Gothic with Arts and Crafts influences

Administration
- District: Cardiff Methodist Circuit

Ely Methodist Church is a Grade II listed Methodist church in the Ely district of Cardiff, Wales. Built in 1911, the church is designed in a Free Gothic style with Arts and Crafts influences.

== History ==
The church was constructed in 1911 to serve the growing Methodist community in Ely, which expanded as a residential area of Cardiff in the early 20th century. The building reflects the architectural transition between Victorian ecclesiastical design and early 20th-century styles.

== Architecture ==
The church is noted for its Free Gothic design with Arts and Crafts elements. Key features include:

- Asymmetrical composition typical of Free Gothic design
- Arts and Crafts-influenced detailing in stonework and woodwork
- Pointed arch windows with decorative tracery
- Steeply pitched roofs

The interior retains original features, including joinery and decorative elements reflecting Arts and Crafts principles.

== Listing ==
The building was listed Grade II by Cadw on 20 May 1975, recognizing its architectural and historical significance.

== Current use ==
The church has been sold and is now Romanian Orthodox. (reference;https://nation.cymru/news/stunning-feature-set-to-transform-historic-church/)

== See also ==
- Listed buildings in Cardiff
- Gothic Revival architecture
- Arts and Crafts movement
