= Water Tower, Cardiff Central Station =

Water Tower
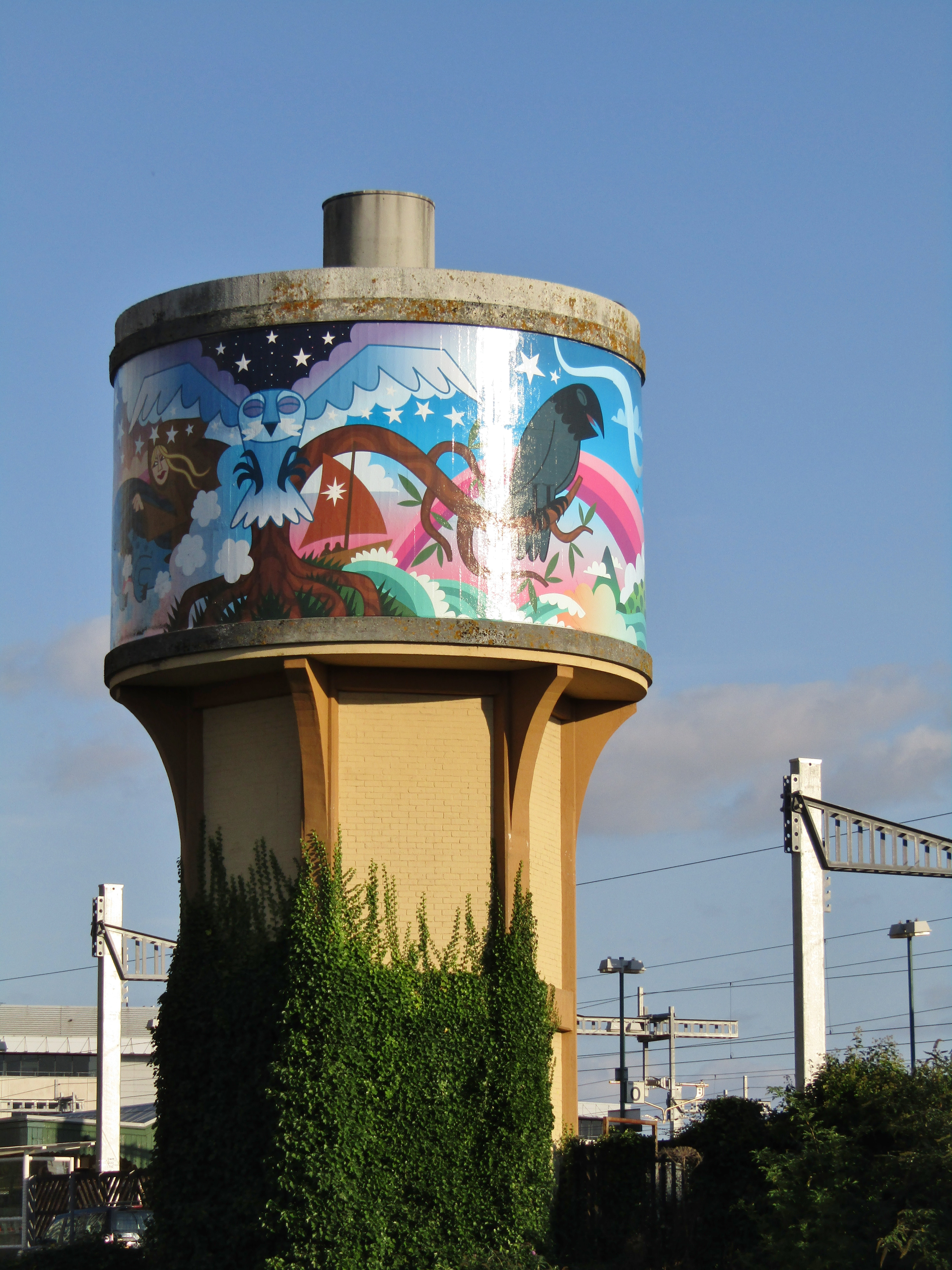
- Water Tower with the mural in 2021

General information
- Town or city: Cardiff
- Country: Wales
- Coordinates: 51°28′33″N 3°10′54″W
- Completed: 1932
- Owner: Network Rail

Listed Building – Grade II
- Official name: Water Tower at Cardiff Central Station
- Designated: 24 November 1998
- Reference no.: 21705

The Water Tower at Cardiff Central Station, Cardiff, Wales is a Grade II listed building, previously used to supply water to steam locomotives on the Great Western Railway. It is located next to the western end of Platform 0, overlooking the River Taff.

== History and description ==
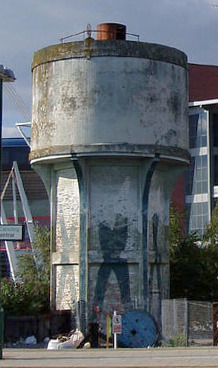
The Water Tower in August 2005

The Water Tower has a large cylindrical tank supported on six concrete ribs around the base. The panels of the tower (between the ribs) are infilled with brick. It has an access door on the southeast side and internal stairs. The tower was built at the same time as the railway station buildings, to serve the station's fish platform. At 15 m (50 ft) in height, it was completed in 1932 and painted in brown and beige, the livery colours of the Great Western Railway.

The tower subsequently became obsolete, but remained in situ and carried a Pirelli Tyres advert in the 1960s/70s. In 1984 it was decorated with a mural of large daffodils, by a team of young boys from Cardiff led by Dennis Bridge. In 2011 a new abstract and colourful design was put forward by local artist, Dan Llewellyn-Hall, but was rejected by Cardiff Council planning committee. In 2012, with the landmark daffodils faded, the tower was returned to the Great Western Railway colours of brown and beige by its current owners, Network Rail.

The tower became Grade II listed in 1998.

=== Weird and Wonderful Wales ===
In 2014 a proposal was put forward for artist Pete Fowler to paint the tower for the Cardiff Contemporary Visual Arts Festival with colourful depictions of characters from the Mabinogion, but this stalled due to funding issues.

In 2015, Fowler and Gavin Johnson from Allotment worked with Literature Wales to develop the idea into a wider project called Weird & Wonderful Wales, which creatively explored Welsh legends at Cadw sites across Wales. Together they secured funding for the mural from Visit Wales, Cadw and FOR Cardiff, and gained the necessary permissions and access. The mural was installed between December 2017 and April 2018.

The Weird & Wonderful Wales Cardiff Water Tower Mural comprises images particularly inspired by The Mabinogion; the ancient oral stories of Wales which were written down in the Middle Ages. Depictions include the giant Bendigeidfran ('Blessed Crow’) – King of Britain – who fought the Irish and whose severed head talked to his men for eighty-seven years. There is the goddess Rhiannon, who rides her horse better and stronger than the best horsemen of Pwyll, Lord of Dyfed. The central image is Blodeuwedd, who was conjured from flowers by two magicians as a wife for Lleu, but was transformed again into an owl as punishment for trying to murder her husband. There is the noble stag, slain by the ghostly hounds of Arawn – Lord of Annwn (the Otherworld). The crow, which finishes the mural, features throughout the stories as a harbinger of death.

== See also ==
- Water Tower, Cardiff Bay
