= St Andrews United Reformed Church, Roath =

Church in Cardiff, Wales

St. Andrew's, Roath
- St. Andrew's United Reformed Church
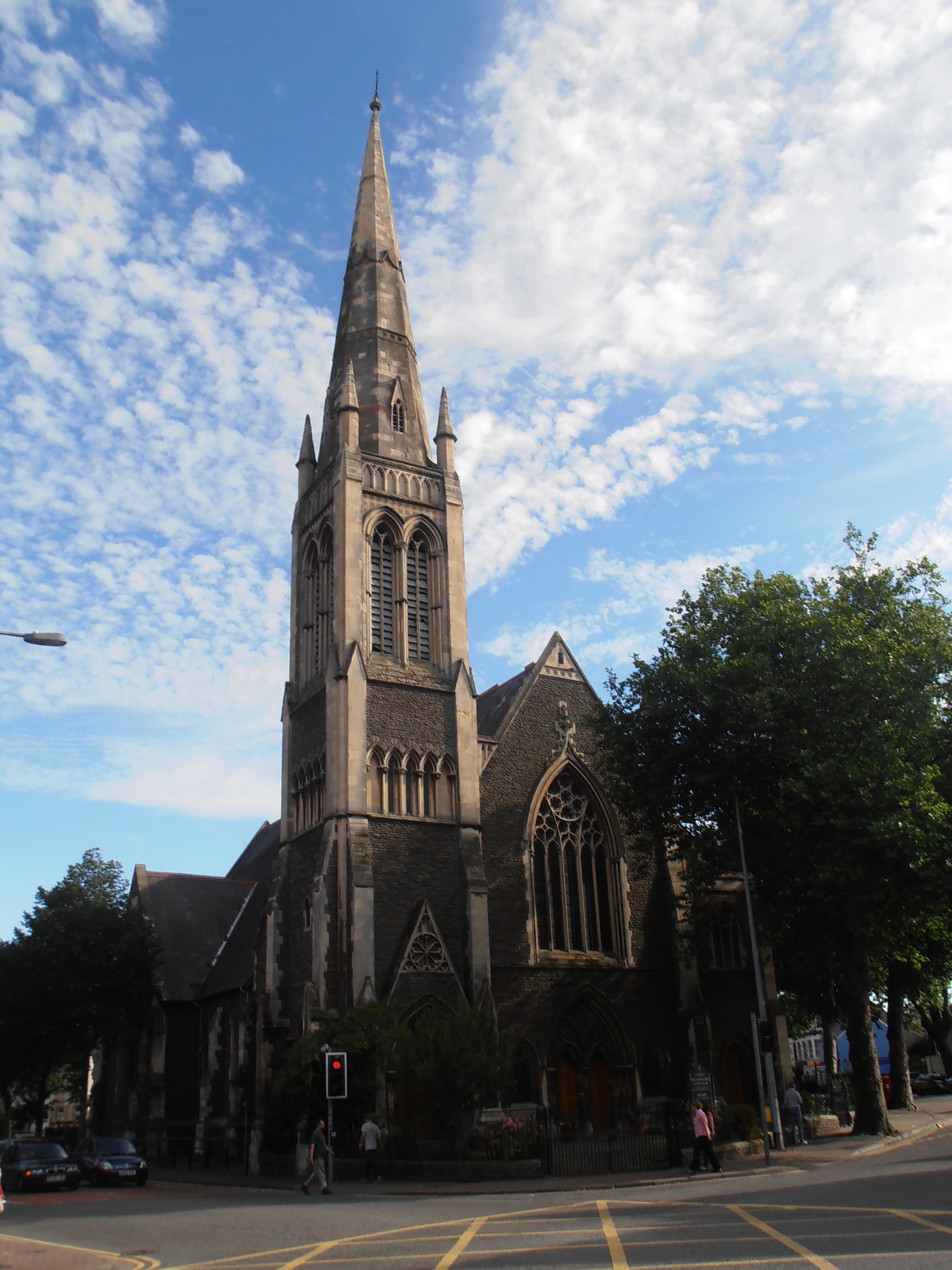

- 51.4960°N 3.1645°W
- Denomination: United Reformed Church
- Previous denomination: Presbyterian
- Website: Church Website

History
- Former name: Roath Park Presbyterian Church
- Status: Active
- Founded: 1897
- Dedication: St Andrew

Architecture
- Heritage designation: Grade II*
- Designated: 19 May 1975
- Architect(s): Habershon & Fawckner
- Style: Gothic Revival
- Groundbreaking: 1899
- Completed: 1900
- Construction cost: £11,000

Specifications
- Capacity: 840
- Materials: Stone

St. Andrew's United Reformed Church is a 19th-century United Reformed church located in the Roath area of Cardiff, Wales. The church is situated on the corner of Wellfield Road and Malborough Road, with some referring to it as the 'church on the corner'. The church covers the ministry areas of Roath and Penylan.

== History ==
=== 1897 to World War 2 ===
In the late 19th Century, the population of Cardiff was enlarging. The Presbyterian church in Cardiff city centre (now the City United Reformed Church) was already full, and plans were put forward for an additional facility in a more suburban location.

In 1895, a site was identified in Wellfield Road (which was then a country lane surrounded by fields), where a chapel was built, coming into use in 1897. Today this is now the church hall. The large numbers drawn to the new place of worship caused plans to be put forward just two years later for the building of a much larger building, which is now the main church building. Much of the money needed to build the church was raised with relative ease, and it opened on 20 June 1900. The church was then called the Roath Park English Presbyterian Church. The main doorway is modeled on the one at Tintern Abbey, and the large west window on one in Melrose Abbey. The congregation was originally mostly Scottish, and the boy scout group wore kilts. The church's attendance peaked in the years before the First World War. During the conflict, the church lost many members of its congregation and its scout group. After 1918, the attendance fell to around 200, which was maintained until the post-war years. The church suffered no damage during the Second World War (even though a bomb fell on Angus Street, just a few streets away), and the church canteen served over 100 people a day. It is recorded that the church's collection plate was pawned to help towards this.

=== 1950s to present ===
In the post-war years, the church's pattern of worship altered. Weekly evening services ceased, and the church no longer has a choir, though retains a small Sunday school. It became St. Andrew's United Reformed Church in 1972, when the Presbyterian church amalgamated with the Congregationalists. The church has been Grade II* listed since 1975. The dwindling attendance figures observed by the church have been expected with changing religious attitudes. The majority of the congregation that still attend are mostly older people, although some families attend for usual Sunday services.

The church's current minister is Rev'd Des Kitto.

== Church buildings ==
What is now the church hall used to be the original chapel (built in 1897) and the larger church was built in 1900. The main church building has a size III/35 Harrison & Harrison Organ; installed in 1900. The main church can seat 500 on the main floor and an additional 200 on the balcony above, accessible from the narthex (main entrance lobby). The church was extensively rewired in 2012 and in recent years has had new heating systems installed. The church hall is used as a canteen, activity and meeting space for other organisations and a crèche during Sunday services and throughout the week. The hall has a balcony too, although it can only seat about 50. Off the hall are many side-rooms, such as the "South Room" which is used for prayer and reflection.

== Events and services ==
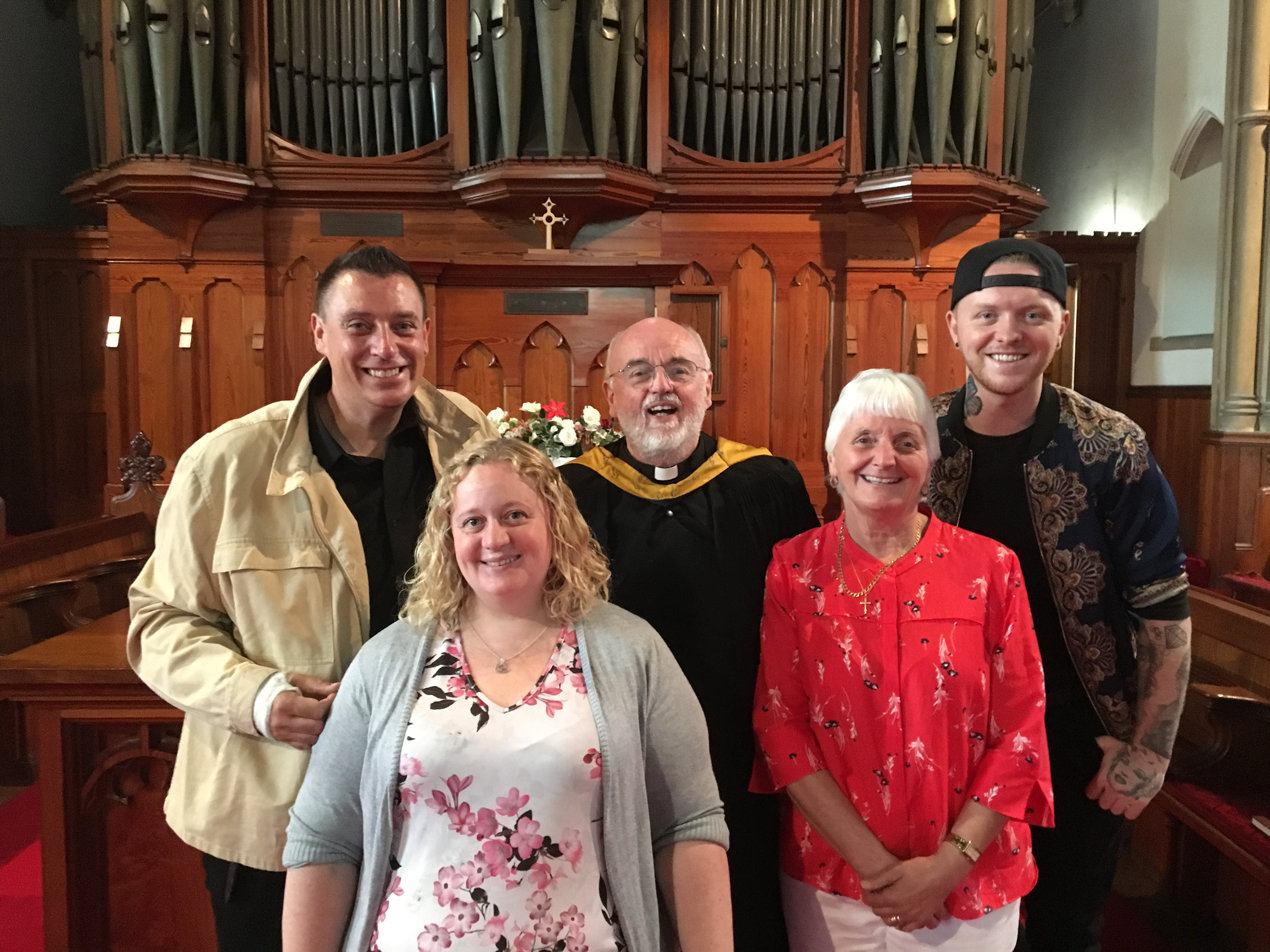
Church Minister Des Kitto (middle rear) with elders and fundraisers

The church holds regular services every Sunday, with holy communion services every first of the month. Each service has an attendance of roughly 50. The service consists of four or five hymns, Bible readings, a message or activity at the start, a sermon and a reflective prayer period. Children usually leave before the sermon and join the junior church in one of the side rooms.

In addition to the regular Sunday services, Christian holidays are also observed - Christmas and Easter. At Christmastime, a toy service is held where the congregation donate children's toys to a charity that gives them to less-fortunate families. Midnight mass is also celebrated on Christmas Eve, as well as a Christmas Day service. The church also holds Remembrance Sunday services alongside St. John's Ambulance.

The church also has a pop-up shop every November and December for 'Cards for Good Causes' with profits going to numerous different charities.

The church is a thriving community hotspot, home to different groups and organisations that use the church on a weekly basis. Groups include dance, yoga, Zumba, Bible study, a toddler's play group and Women's Institute. The church is home to a thriving Scout Group, 25th Cardiff (1st Cardiff Scottish) with Beavers, Cubs and Scouts meeting weekly.

The church has become popular as a local concert venue, with bands such as Cardiff-based Hegsy and The Elements and choirs such as the Cwmbach Male Choir hosting their own concerts in the main church area.
