= Llanfair-fach House =

Country house in Cardiff, Wales

- Location within Cardiff
- 51.5049°N 3.3005°W
- Type: House
- Location: Capel Llaniltern, Cardiff, Glamorgan

History
- Built: 17th century

Site notes
- Architectural style: Vernacular
- Owner: Privately owned

Listed Building – Grade II*
- Official name: Llanfair-fach House
- Designated: 11 May 1995
- Reference no.: 11707

Llanfair-fach House is a house with 17th century origins, close to Capel Llaniltern in the community of St Fagans, Cardiff, Wales. It is a Grade II* listed building.

== History ==
Llanfair-fach lies to the north-west of Cardiff, near to the hamlet of Capel Llaniltern in the community of St Fagans. The house dates from the early 17th century. In 1670 it was recorded as a "tenement in the parish of St Fagan". The Royal Commission on the Ancient and Historical Monuments of Wales undertook an internal survey in 1995, and holds a large collection of photographs taken at that time in its Coflein archive.

== Architecture and description ==
The building is of two storeys and built to a cross-passage plan. The construction material is local rubble under a Welsh slate roof. The architectural historian John Newman, in his Glamorgan volume of the Buildings of Wales, noted the "status-giving porch". Peter Smith, in his study, Houses of the Welsh Countryside, records that access to the upper-floor was by way of a staircase next to the hall fireplace. Cadw lists the house at Grade II* as "an important gentry house with much surviving detail".

== Sources ==
- Newman, John (1995). Glamorgan. The Buildings of Wales. London, UK: Penguin Books. ISBN 978-0-140-71056-4. OCLC 33858574.
- Smith, Peter (1988). Houses of the Welsh Countryside. London: Her Majesty's Stationery Office. ISBN 978-0-113-00012-8.
