= St Fagans Old Rectory =

Building in Cardiff, Wales

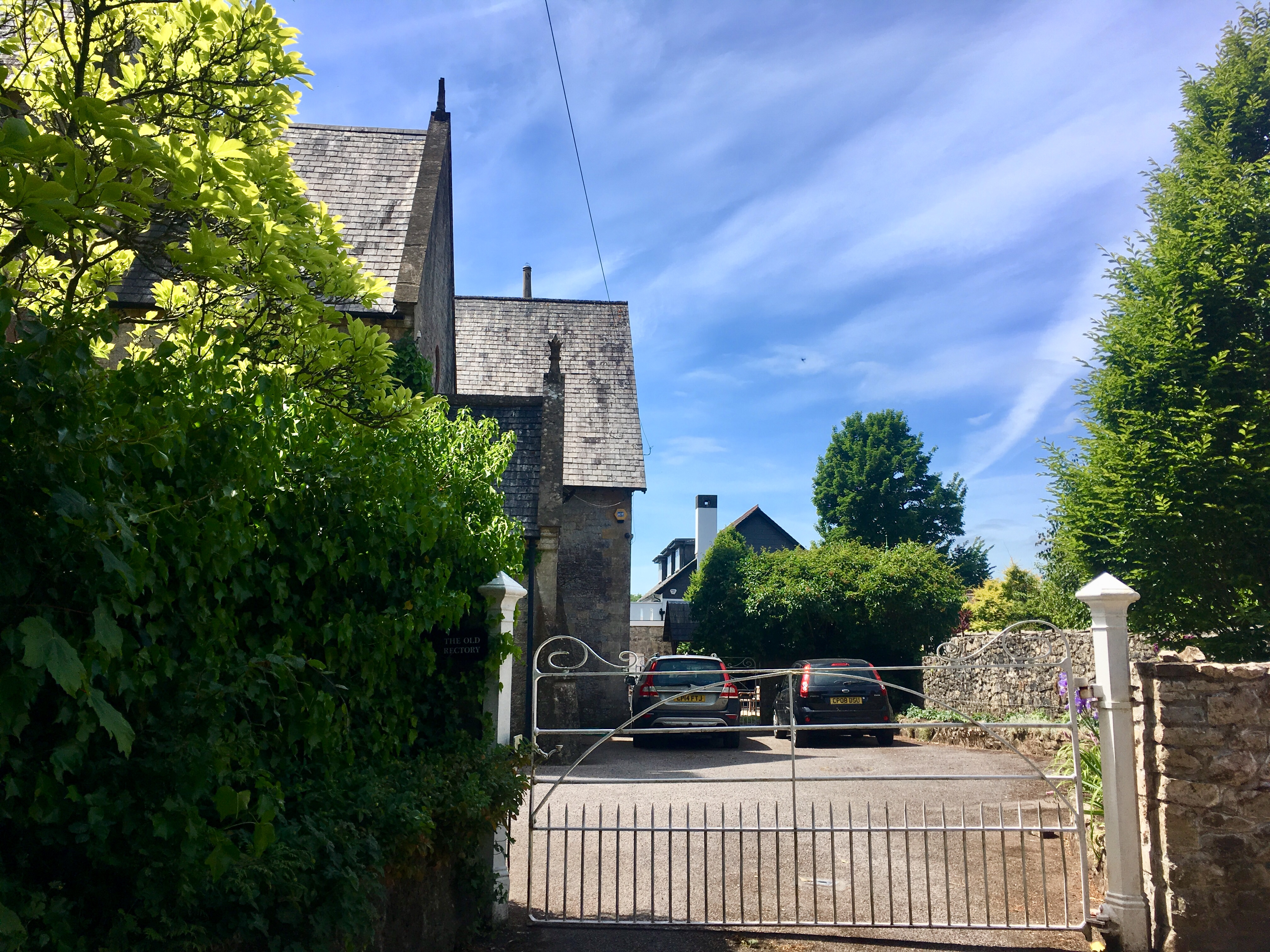

- Location within Cardiff

General information
- Location: St Fagans, Cardiff, Wales
- Coordinates: 51.4888°N 3.2668°W
- Completed: 1859

St Fagans Old Rectory is a Grade II* listed building in the village of St Fagans in western Cardiff.

It is an important Victorian house designed by John Prichard and John Pollard Seddon, built in 1858–9 and used as a rectory until 1975. It is built from coursed squared lies with Bath stone dressings in two storeys and a French medieval-style attic. The steep roofs are made from Welsh slate. A lean-to veranda across the ground floor is supported by stone columns with capitals. The southern bay of the east elevation has a tall truncated pyramidal roof and on the eastern end is a gabled porch.
