= Pencoed House =

Country house in Cardiff, Wales

- Location within Cardiff
- 51.5104°N 3.3094°W
- Type: House (now a wedding and events venue)
- Location: Pentyrch, Cardiff, Glamorgan

History
- Built: 16th and 17th centuries, likely earlier origins

Site notes
- Architectural style: Vernacular
- Owner: Privately owned

Listed Building – Grade II*
- Official name: Pencoed House
- Designated: 28 January 1963
- Reference no.: 13608

Pencoed House is a house with medieval origins, close to Capel Llaniltern in the community of Pentyrch, Cardiff, Wales. Dating mainly from the 16th and 17th centuries, it is a Grade II* listed building. The house now operates as a wedding and events venue.

== History ==
Much of the present structure of Pencoed dates from the 16th and 17th centuries. The Royal Commission on the Ancient and Historical Monuments of Wales identifies earlier medieval origins, with Tudor and later additions. Cadw supports this interpretation and suggests that the building began as a country mansion, and was subsequently adapted to serve as a farmhouse.

Pencoed House now operates as a wedding and events venue.

== Architecture and description ==
The building is of two storeys and built to a cross-passage plan. The construction material is local rubble under a Welsh slate roof. The architectural historian John Newman, in his Glamorgan volume of the Buildings of Wales, noted the "magnificent but inexplicable archway, so fine, and so large, that it implies the existence of an impressive medieval house now otherwise disappeared". Peter Smith, in his study, Houses of the Welsh Countryside, records the house as having a single, central chimneystack. Pencoed is a Grade II* listed building.

== Sources ==
- Newman, John (1995). Glamorgan. The Buildings of Wales. London, UK: Penguin Books. ISBN 978-0-140-71056-4. OCLC 33858574.
- Smith, Peter (1988). Houses of the Welsh Countryside. London: Her Majesty's Stationery Office. ISBN 978-0-113-00012-8.
