= Old Probate Registry, Llandaff =

Probate registry in Cardiff, Wales

Old Probate Registry
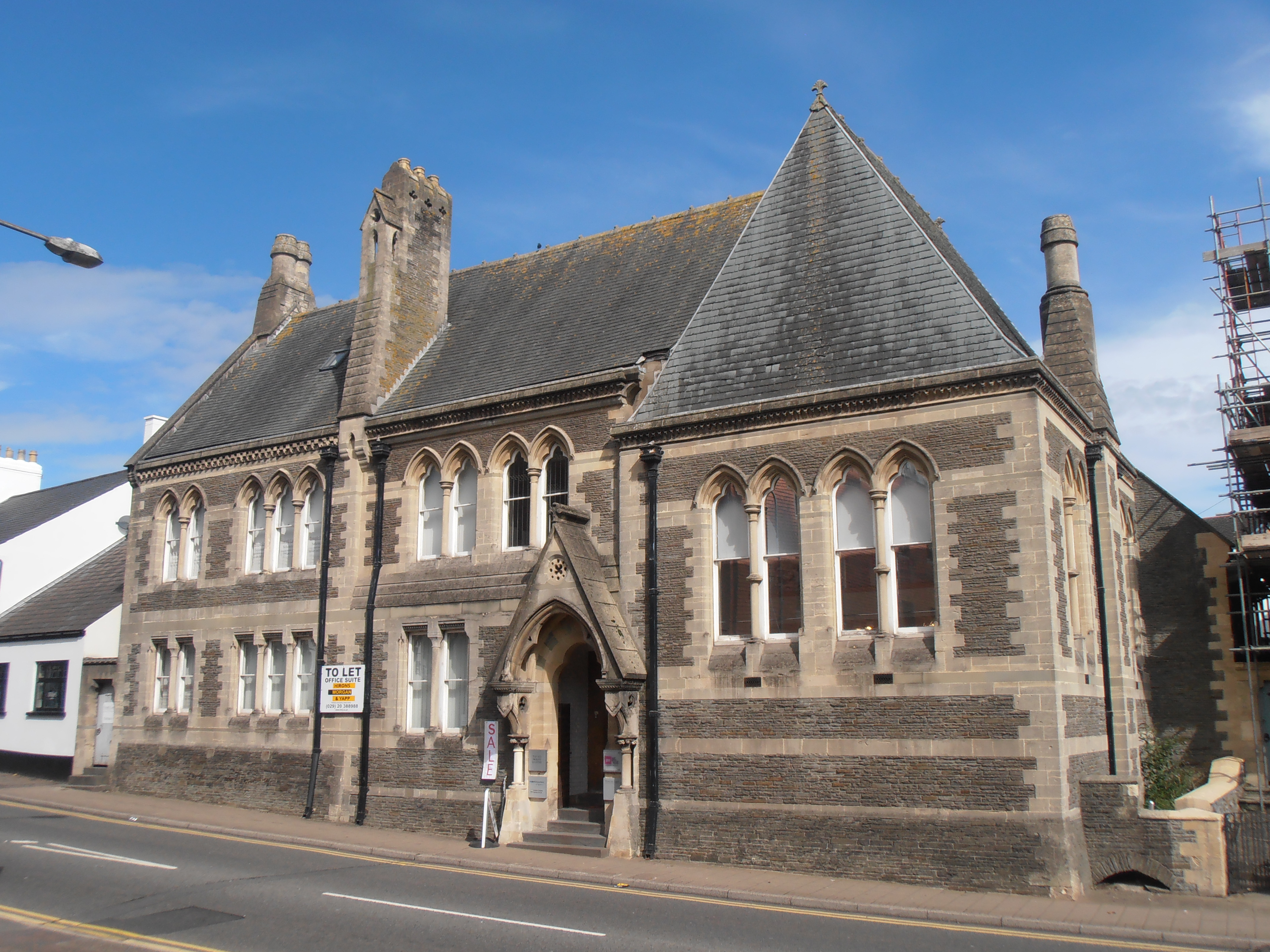
- "by John Prichard, the pre-eminent Victorian architect of South Wales [and] possibly his finest secular design"

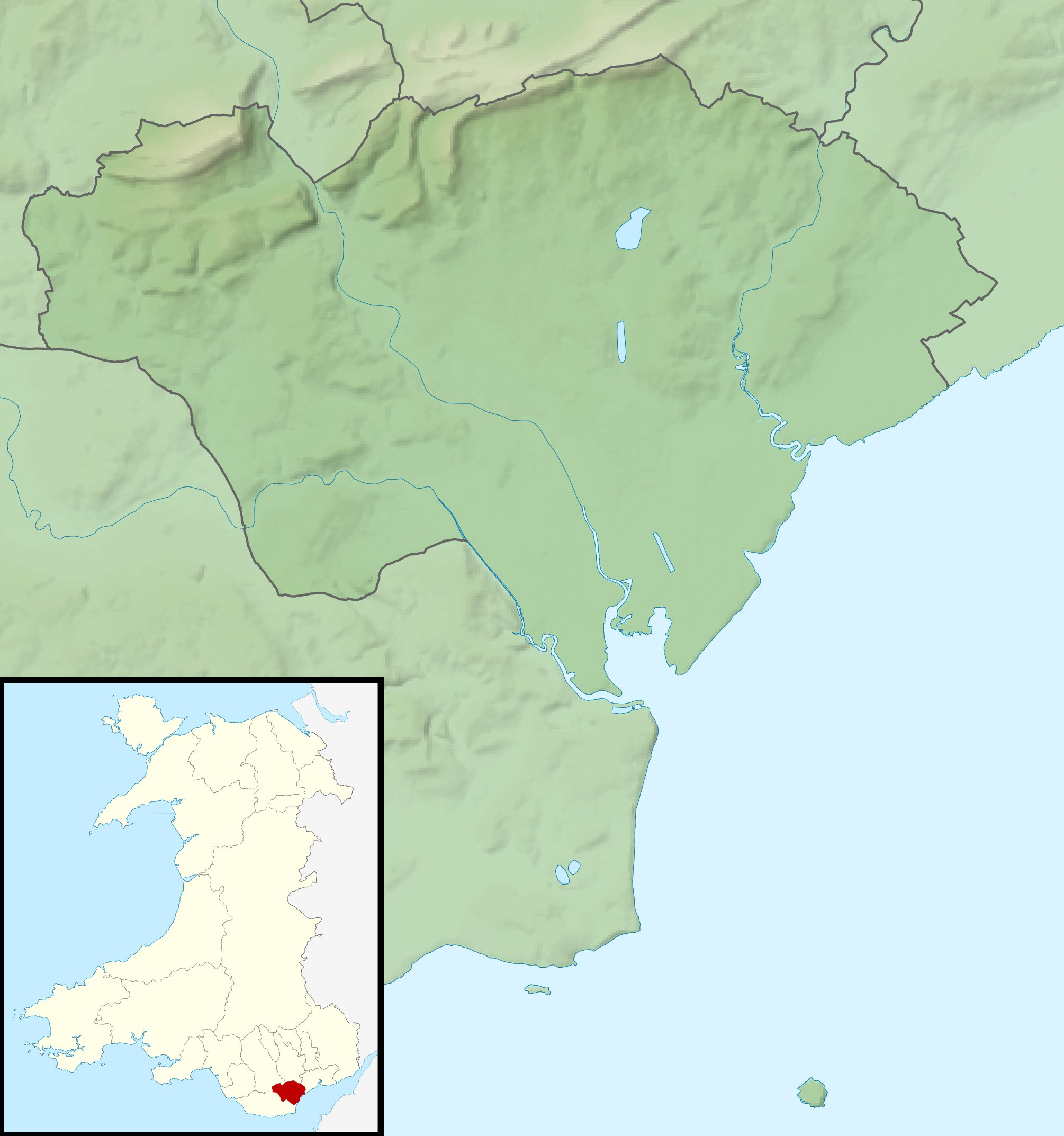
- Location within Cardiff
- 51.4934°N 3.2191°W
- Type: Probate registry
- Location: Llandaff, Cardiff, Glamorgan

History
- Built: 1860-1863

Site notes
- Architect: John Prichard
- Architectural style: Gothic Revival

Listed Building – Grade II*
- Official name: No.49 Cardiff Road, Llandaff, The High Court of Justice, Probate Registry of Wales, South Glamorgan
- Designated: 19 May 1975
- Reference no.: 13648

Listed Building – Grade II
- Official name: The Old Registry
- Designated: 19 May 1975
- Reference no.: 13649

Listed Building – Grade II
- Official name: Front garden wall
- Designated: 19 May 1975
- Reference no.: 13650

The Old Probate Registry is a former probate office in Llandaff, Cardiff, Wales. Dating from 1863, it was designed by John Prichard, the diocesan architect for Llandaff, and has been described as his finest secular building. The Old Probate Registry is a Grade II* listed building while the Old Registry next door, designed by Prichard as the registrar's house, is listed at Grade II, and the composition is completed by an enclosing garden wall, also listed at Grade II. The Probate Registry was converted to commercial office us in the 1990s. In 2024 plans were submitted to convert the building to private residential use.

== History ==
Until the mid-19th century the registration of wills and the administration of probate was an ecclesiastical function, undertaken in Cardiff by the Diocese of Llandaff. The Old Probate Registry also served as the national probate office for the whole of Wales. The design of the registry was undertaken by John Prichard (1817 - 1886), who served as diocesan architect and was responsible for the major restoration of Llandaff Cathedral undertaken between 1844 and 1857. (Note: John Prichard is buried in Llandaff Cathedral churchyard.) Cadw considers Prichard "the pre-eminent Victorian architect of South Wales" and describes the Old Probate Registry as "possibly his finest secular design".

The registry moved to new, purpose-built offices in 1990 and the building was converted to commercial offices and an art gallery. (Note: Probate records from 1568-1857 which were held at the Old Registry are now part of the archive of the National Museum of Wales.) By 2024 all of the offices had been vacated and plans to convert the empty building to three private houses were submitted to Cardiff City Council. The adjacent Registry Office had been converted to a private residence around 2020. The buildings stand within the boundary of the Llandaff conservation area.

== Architecture and description ==
The Old Probate Registry is built of Pennant Sandstone with Bath Stone ashlar dressings. It is of two storeys with attics. The style is Gothic Revival. The architectural historian John Newman, in his Glamorgan volume in the Pevsner Buildings of Wales series, describes it as being constructed to an "Early English T-plan. Newman shared Cadw's admiration; "to see what John Prichard could achieve as a secular architect one need only [view] his Probate Registry, an excellent example of the 'true picturesque'". The Old Probate Registry is a Grade II* listed building. The adjacent Registry Office and the fronting garden wall both have separate Grade II listings.

== Sources ==
- Holland, Edward (2024). Old Probate Registry, No. 49 Cardiff Road, Llandaff (PDF). Holland Heritage.
- Newman, John (1995). Glamorgan. The Buildings of Wales. London, UK: Penguin Books. ISBN 978-0-140-71056-4. OCLC 33858574.
