= Leckwith Bridge =

Grade II* listed building in Cardiff

Coordinates: 51.4699°N 3.2119°W

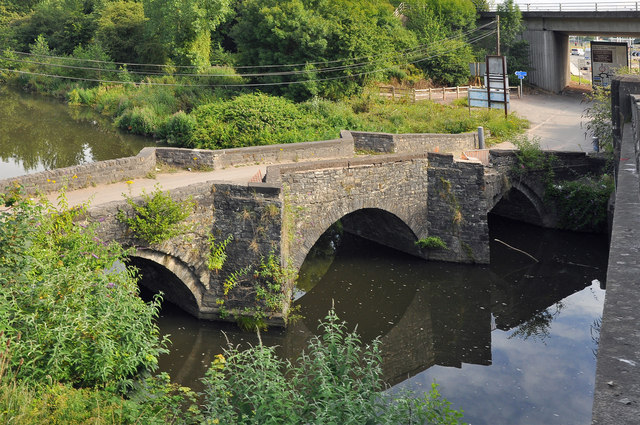
Leckwith old bridge viewed from the new bridge

Leckwith Bridge, can refer to the medieval Grade II* listed stone bridge over the river Ely at Leckwith, Cardiff, or its 20th century replacement.

== Old bridge ==
The old Leckwith Bridge dates from at least the early 16th century, referred to in 1536 as being "soundly built of stone". It was probably partially rebuilt in the 17th century and the central arch being rebuilt during the 18th century. The bridge has three arches built of rubblestone. The roadway is approximately 2.75m (9 feet) in width, with the addition of pedestrian refuges above pointed cutwaters between each arch.

The bridge was listed as Grade II* in 1952, being an example of "a fine and rare medieval bridge". It is also designated as a scheduled monument The bridge remains in use today for goods vehicles accessing the adjacent builders' yards.

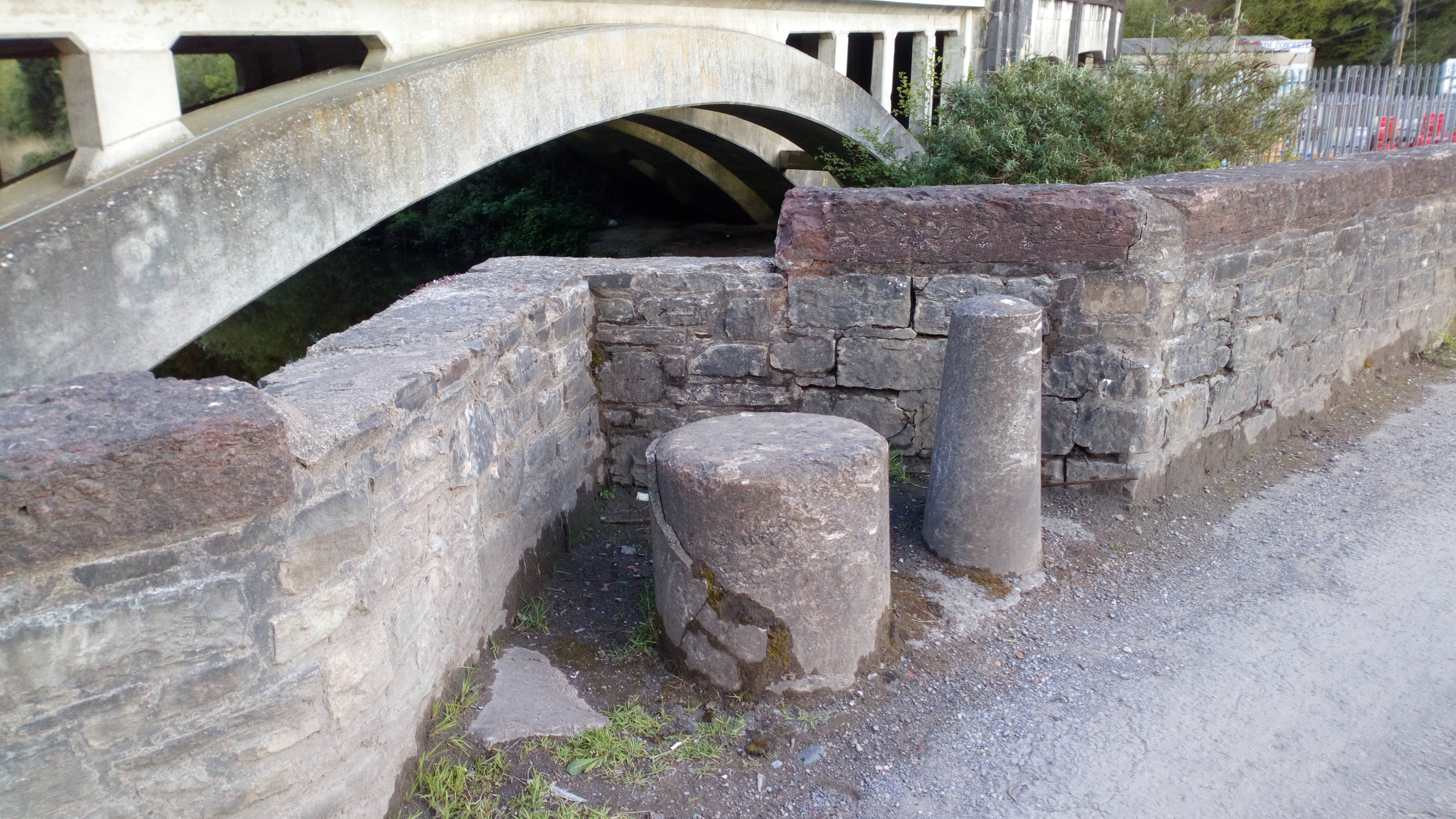
The pedestrian cuttings on Leckwith Old Bridge, downriver

== New bridge ==
A new single span reinforced concrete bridge was built next door to the old bridge in 1935, taking the main road between Cardiff and Leckwith village. It was opened on 17 April by the Minister of Transport, Leslie Hore-Belisha. The road continues west on a 150m (500 feet) concrete viaduct. By the 2010s the new bridge was in poor condition with weight restrictions imposed on it.

== See also ==
- List of bridges in Wales
