= Castle Arcade =

Shopping arcade in Cardiff, Wales

Coordinates: 51.4806°N 3.1809°W

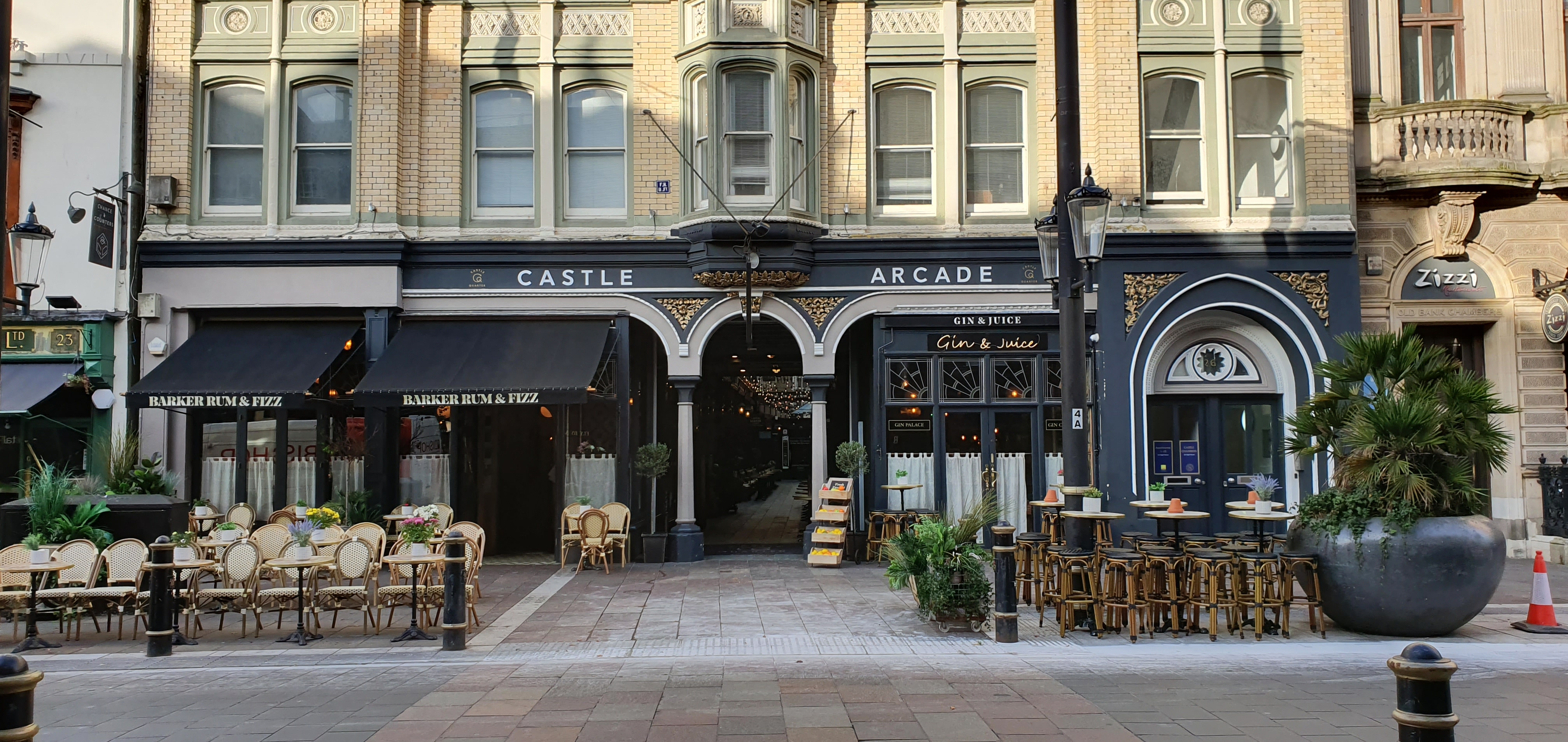
Castle Arcade entrance in High Street

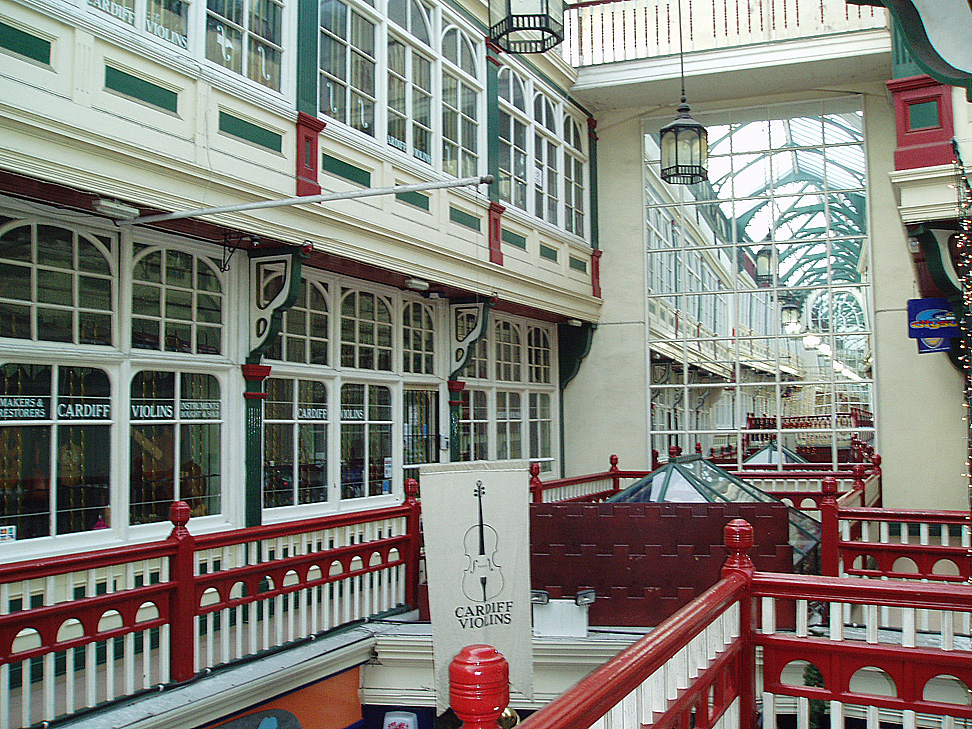
The upper level of Castle Arcade

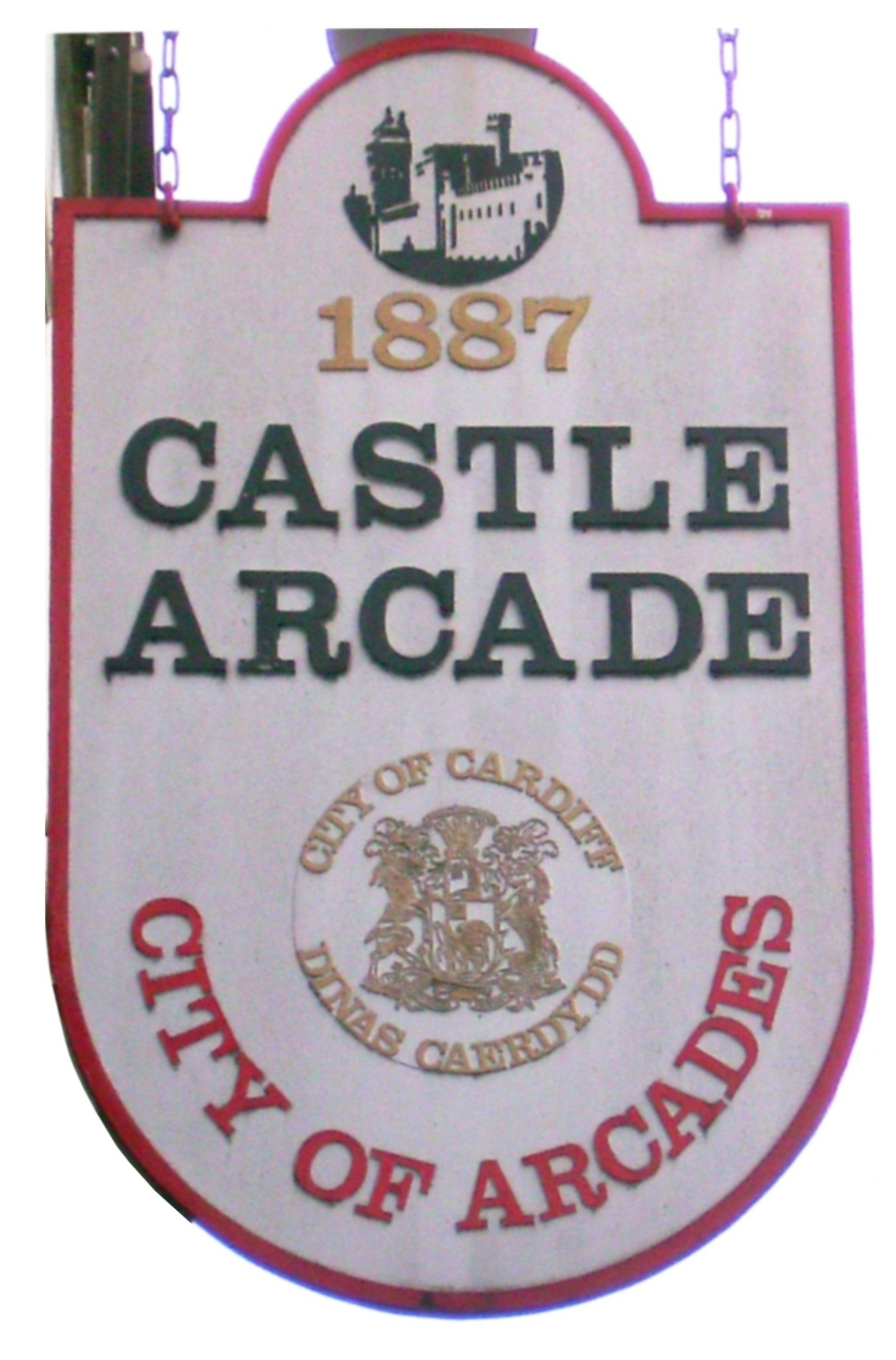

The Castle Arcade is a shopping arcade in Cardiff, South Wales.

Started in 1887, it runs south from opposite Cardiff Castle, and then turns east to exit on the High Street, in the Castle Quarter.

== History ==
Castle Arcade, one of Cardiff's historic shopping arcades, was constructed in 1887 by architect Edwin Seward for the Bute Estate. It was part of the Marquess of Bute's urban development plans, which transformed Cardiff into a thriving commercial hub in the late 19th century.

The arcade suffered damage during the Cardiff Blitz in 1941 and was later restored, retaining its original Victorian character.

== Cultural significance ==
Castle Arcade was Grade II* listed in 1975, being the "finest of Cardiff's Victorian arcades". The four storey entrance block facing onto the High Street is separately listed, also as Grade II*.

Castle Arcade is a key part of Cardiff's heritage tourism, featured in films and TV shows such as Doctor Who.

== See also ==
- List of shopping arcades in Cardiff
- Victorian architecture
