= Salutem Healthcare =

English social care company

- Company type: Public
- Industry: Social care
- Founded: 2016; 10 years ago
- Area served: Worldwide
- Key people: John Godden

Salutem Healthcare is a social care provider based in Windsor, Berkshire, England, founded in 2016. It employs more than 3,000 staff.

Salutem provides residential healthcare and education services for more than 1,350 adults and children with learning disabilities and associated needs, including those with challenging behaviours. In April 2017 it took over Pathways Care Group and Modus Care, two providers of specialist care services for children and adults with learning disabilities, mental health conditions, autism and challenging behaviours. At that point it had 55 homes with about 400 residents. The purchase of Clearwater Care in November 2017 added an additional 20 services. In October 2019 it was running 130 services across England and Wales.

In April 2018 Salutem purchased 51 services from Scope, including three special schools, 38 care homes and 10 day services. The transfer included 1,598 staff, two thirds of the charity's payroll, were transferred from Scope to Ambito Care & Education, a division of Salutem. Scope made £3 million on the deal.

It runs an annual a black-tie event, the Kudos Ball, at Rainton Meadows Arena, Houghton-le-Spring for 300 service users from across the country.

== Services ==
Craig y Parc is a school in Cardiff established in 1955, for complex, neurological and multi disabilities, formerly run by Scope. Tŷ Cwtch Residential Children home is nearby. In April 2020 a display by the local police force was organised for the 14th birthday of one of the pupils. The school uses Dragon Dictate to help pupils.

Documentary director Mei Williams was given a BAFTA award in 2019 for his film about a resident of Lewis Martin Court where the company provides round-the-clock care for young adults with complex needs.

Bull Point is a residential care home in Plymouth for five people with an Autistic Spectrum Disorder. In 2019 it organised a dog show to celebrate the 8th birthday of a dog belonging to one of the residents.

== Honours for the CEO ==
John Godden, the chief executive, was awarded an MBE in the 2021 New Year Honours.

== See also ==
- Private healthcare in the United Kingdom
