= Castell-y-mynach =

Grade II* listed medieval manor house in Cardiff, Wales

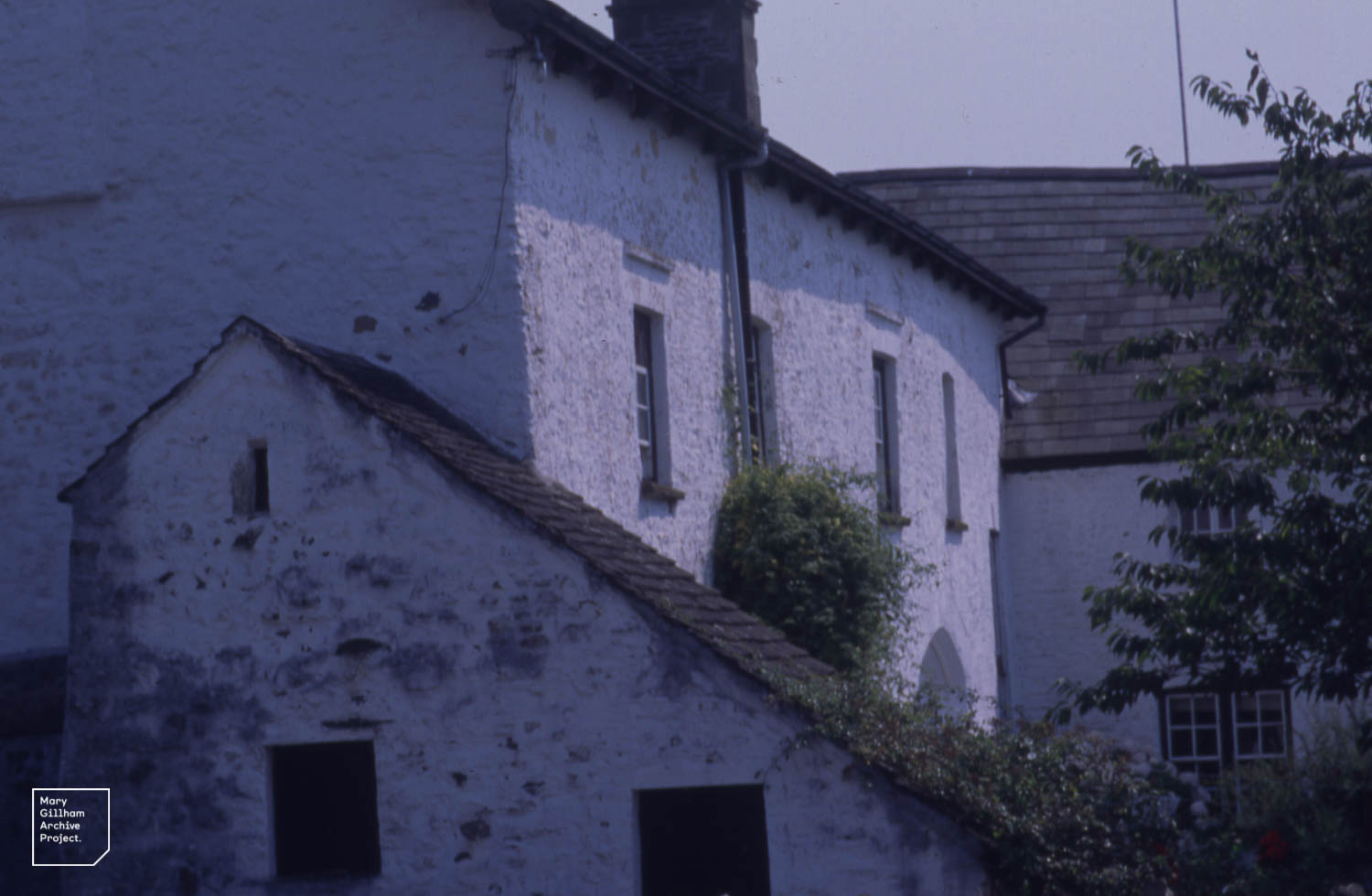
- The north and west frontages

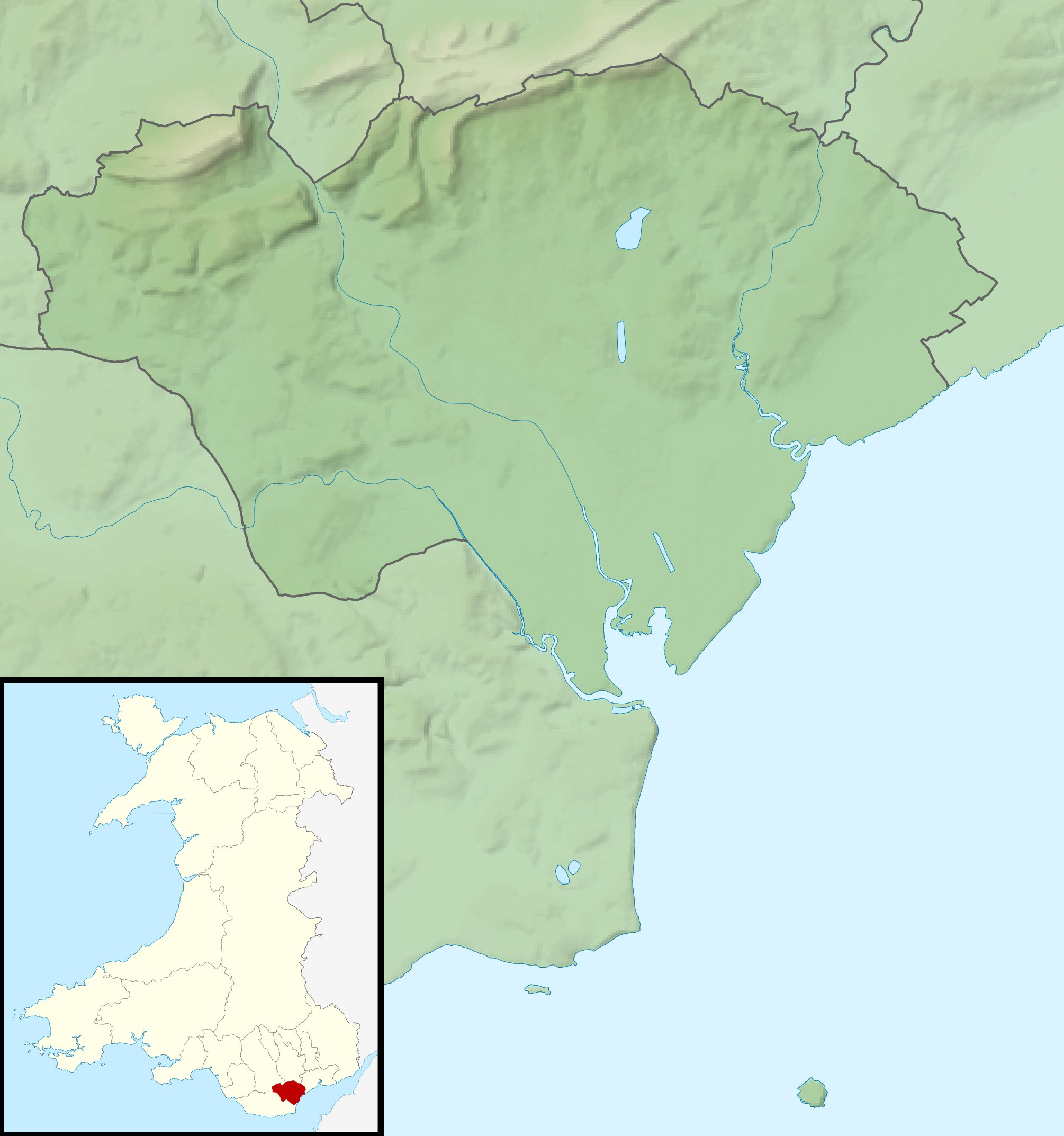
- Location within Cardiff
- 51.521°N 3.3244°W
- Type: Manor house
- Location: Creigiau, Cardiff, Glamorgan

History
- Built: 15th century

Site notes
- Architectural style: Vernacular
- Owner: Privately owned

Listed Building – Grade II*
- Official name: Castell-y-mynach
- Designated: 14 February 1952
- Reference no.: 13517

Castell-y-mynach (the castle of the monks), is a 15th century manor house in Creigiau, Cardiff, Wales. One of the largest late-medieval houses in Glamorgan, it is a Grade II* listed building.

== History ==
The house was originally the home of the Mathews family, reputedly built by a Robert Mathews in the 15th century. At the time of construction, it was among the largest late-medieval houses in Glamorgan. A later owner was Thomas Mathew, High Sheriff of Glamorgan in 1614. Known as the "bullying squire", tradition suggests that his death was brought about by a disgruntled tenant who inserted an awl into the cushion of Mathews' favourite chair at Castell-y-mynach, causing his demise. The Mathews family line ended in 1720 and the house passed into the possession of the Lords Dynevor. By the mid-19th century, when the site was visited and described by Samuel Lewis in his A Topographical Dictionary of Wales, it had descended to the status of a farmhouse. The name of Castell-y-mynach, suggesting a fortified monastic grange, has been challenged in the 20th century, and it is thought more probable that the name reflected a late-medieval wish to attribute antiquity to the site. The house is now entirely surrounded by a 20th-century housing estate.

== Architecture and description ==
The house is built of rubble stone, which was originally lime washed. The present building consists of two long, two-storey, ranges to an L-plan. John Newman, in his 1995 Glamorgan volume in the Buildings of Wales series, suggests that these form the two remaining sections of an original courtyard house. The quality of the stonemasonry is high. The interior contains some notable wall paintings, (Note: The house also contains two hatchments, of the Royal Arms of the Stuarts and those of the Mathews family.) which Peter Smith, in his study, Houses of the Welsh Countryside, records as "unusually well-preserved". The staircase wall is decorated with red and black lozenge patterns and grotesques with a date of 1602, while the upper hall has a "still more impressive fragment" depicting two male nudes bearing a cartoon of ships in a storm. Newman considers the murals as "worthy of court art of the period".

Castell-y-mynach is a Grade II* listed building.

== Sources ==
- Lewis, Samuel (1849). A Topographical Dictionary of Wales. London.
- Morris, W. M. (1901). History of Castell-y-Mynach and surrounding district of Creigiau, near Pentyrch (PDF). Pontypridd: Ford Printers.
- Newman, John (1995). Glamorgan. The Buildings of Wales. London, UK: Penguin Books. ISBN 978-0-140-71056-4. OCLC 33858574.
- Smith, Peter (1988). Houses of the Welsh Countryside. London: Her Majesty's Stationery Office. ISBN 978-0-113-00012-8.
