= Gelynis Farmhouse =

Grade II* listed farmhouse in Cardiff, Wales

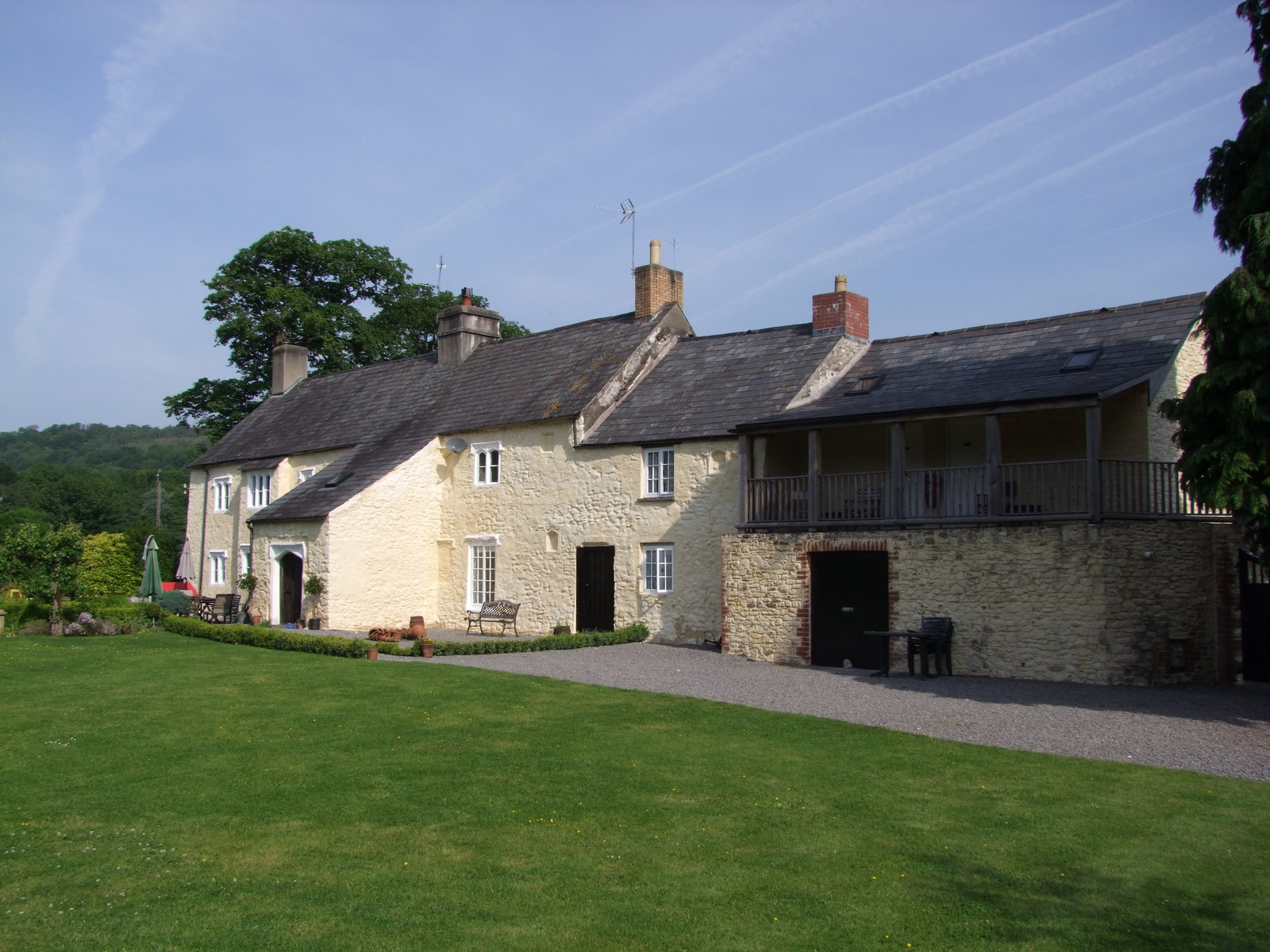
- "one of the most completely preserved early vernacular houses in the county"

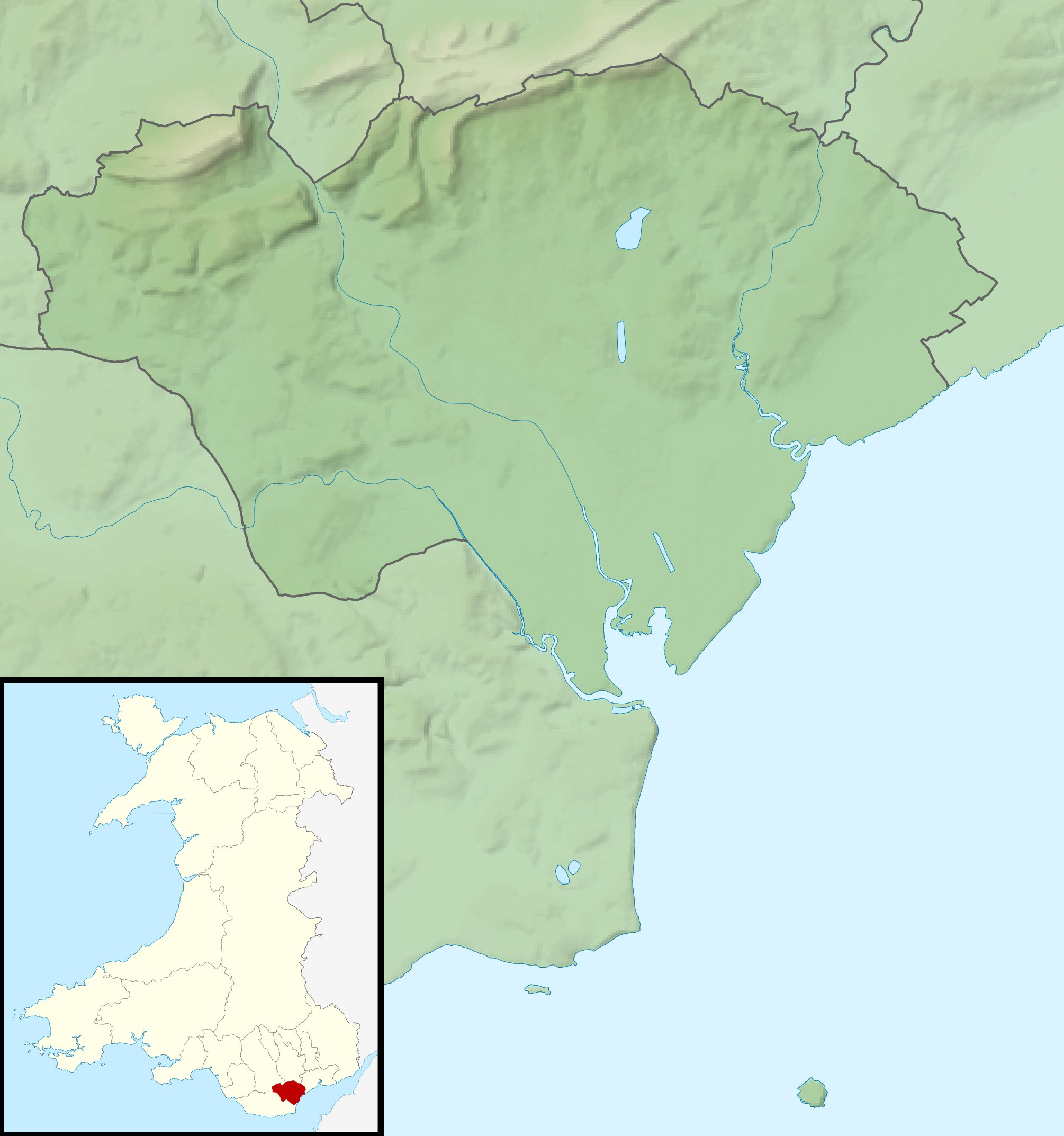
- Location within Cardiff
- 51.5269°N 3.2546°W
- Type: Farmhouse
- Location: Radyr, Cardiff, Glamorgan

History
- Built: 16th century

Site notes
- Architectural style: Vernacular
- Owner: Privately owned

Listed Building – Grade II*
- Official name: Gelynis Farmhouse and attached cottage and stable
- Designated: 6 October 1977
- Reference no.: 13912

Listed Building – Grade II
- Official name: Gelynis Farm Range
- Designated: 24 February 2000
- Reference no.: 22855

Gelynis Farmhouse (Cil-Ynnys) is a 16th century farmhouse in Radyr, Cardiff, Wales. It is a Grade II* listed building.

== History ==
Gelynis is located in the community of Radyr and Morganstown, a suburb to the north-west of Cardiff. The farmhouse dates from the 16th century. Tradition ascribes its construction variously to Hugh Lambert, an ironmaster from Kent but of French origins, (Note: Cadw, which follows the attribution to Hugh Lambert, suggests he was encouraged to bring his ironworking skills to Wales by Sir Henry Sidney, president of the Council of Wales and the Marches, who was developing an ironworks and forge at Pentyrch.) or to a Cardiff merchant. John Newman, in his 1995 Glamorgan volume in the Buildings of Wales series, suggests that it was clearly built "for someone with pretensions", citing the decorative stonework and the double-height bay window.

In the 21st century Gelynis operated as bed and breakfast accommodation. In Spring 2025 the farmhouse was for sale.

== Architecture and description ==
Newman describes Gelynis Farmhouse as "one of the most completely preserved early vernacular houses in the county". It is of two storeys and built to a cross passage plan. The building material is local rubble stone with a coating of limewash. The roofing material is Welsh slate. The range lies at a right angle to the farm and Cadw suggests it is mostly of a later date, principally of the 19th century.

The farmhouse is a Grade II* listed building. The range is separately listed at Grade II.

== Sources ==
- Newman, John (1995). Glamorgan. The Buildings of Wales. London, UK: Penguin Books. ISBN 978-0-140-71056-4. OCLC 33858574.
