= St Mary's Church, St Fagans =

Church in Cardiff, Wales

Coordinates: 51.487094°N 3.267099°W

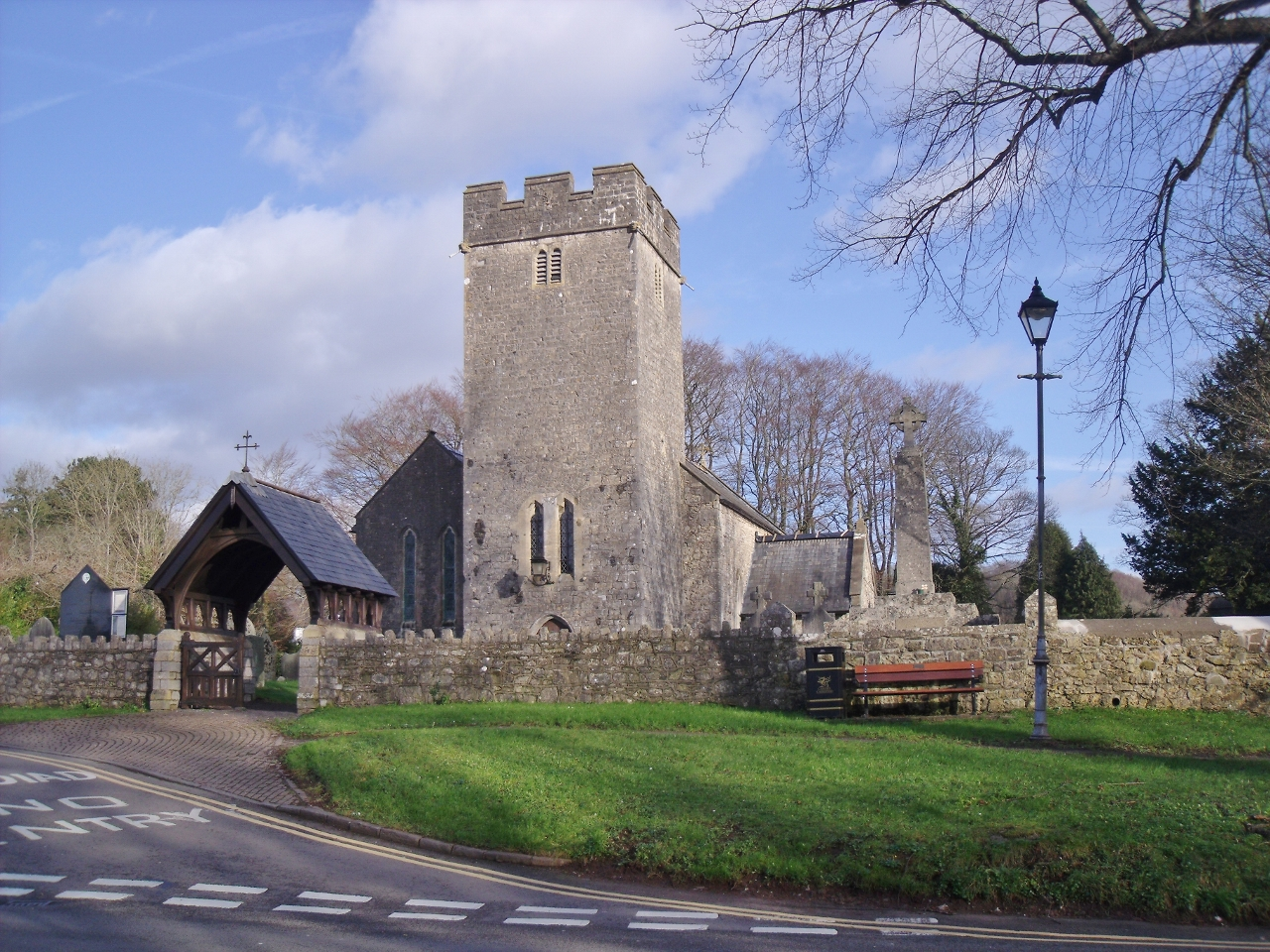
- The Church of St Mary, St Fagans in 2012

- Location in Cardiff
- Location: St Fagans, Cardiff
- Country: Wales
- Denomination: Church in Wales

History
- Founded: 12th century
- Dedication: Mary, mother of Jesus

Architecture
- Heritage designation: Grade II*
- Architectural type: Church
- Style: Medieval

The Saint Mary's Church in St Fagans is a medieval church located in Cardiff, south Wales. Built in the 12th century it underwent extensive and sympathetic restoration in 1859, undertaken by G. E. Street in 1859. The Church of St Mary was listed as a Grade II* building on 28 January 1963.

== History ==
The church of St Mary's has its origins in the 12th century, with its first rector recorded in 1301. The church underwent major alterations in the 14th century and a porch and new roof were added in the 15th century. The tower was rebuilt in the 1600s and repaired and heightened in 1730. In 1859 G. E. Street began extensive restoration and added a vestry and north aisle, paid for by Baroness Windsor. The church was listed as a Grade II* building on 28 January 1963, citied as being 'highly graded as a medieval fabric with interesting Victorian additions and restorations by G E Street'.

== Architecture ==
The church is built of local rubblestone with Welsh slate roofs. The later tower is built of coursed and roughly squared stone, with dressed quoins.

== Primary sources ==
- Newman, John (1995). Glamorgan. London: Penguin Group. ISBN 0140710566.
