= St Augustine's Church, Rumney =

Church in Cardiff, Wales

St Augustine's, Rumney
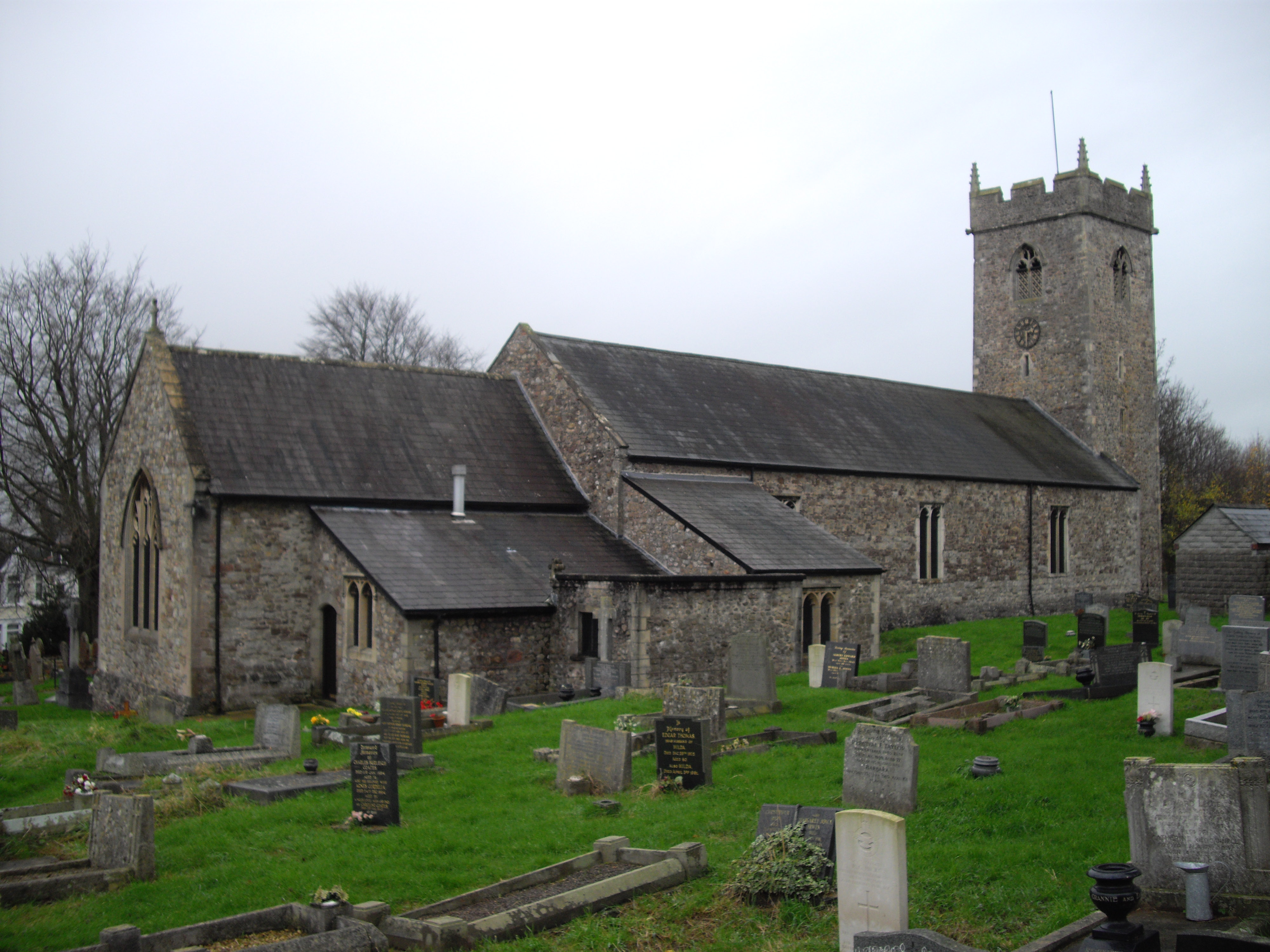
- St Augustine's, Rumney
- 51.5055°N 3.1334°W
- Denomination: Anglican
- Website: St Augustine's Church

History
- Status: Active
- Founded: 1108

Architecture
- Heritage designation: Grade II*
- Designated: 19 May 1975

Specifications
- Materials: stone

Administration
- Diocese: Monmouth

St Augustine's Church, Rumney, is a listed place of worship in the Cardiff suburb of Rumney. The church falls under the ecclesiastical jurisdiction of the diocese of Monmouth.

== History ==
Although the church dates from 1108, a religious presence is thought to have existed at the approximate location for around a century prior to this. The oldest surviving part of the building, the west doorway, dates from c. 1200. The building was enlarged in 1470, when a nave, tower and chancel were added. The church was under the patronage of St. Augustine's Abbey, Bristol (hence its dedication to St. Augustine) and from 1542 Bristol Cathedral. The collection of tithes was sometimes delegated to local landowners – a Katherine Morgan of Llanrumney Hall had that right in 1603.

The church was extensively refurbished in the late 19th and early 20th Centuries. The churchyard is believed to have been cleared of ancient burials at some point during the mid-19th Century, as no extant stone is older than this. The church had no electricity until 1931. Having anciently been part of Monmouthshire, Rumney civil parish was transferred to the jurisdiction of Cardiff in 1937, though the church remains in the diocese of its former county. The tower's clock was installed in 1962. Most of the church's stained glass dates from 1915 (the work of Charles Eamer Kempe), though the pair of Te Deum windows were not added until 1950. The church gained listed status in 1975.

In 2016, the church celebrated its (estimated) 1000 year anniversary, though the actual age of the original Christian presence is not known.
