= St Edeyrn's Church =

Church in Cardiff, Wales

St Edeyrn
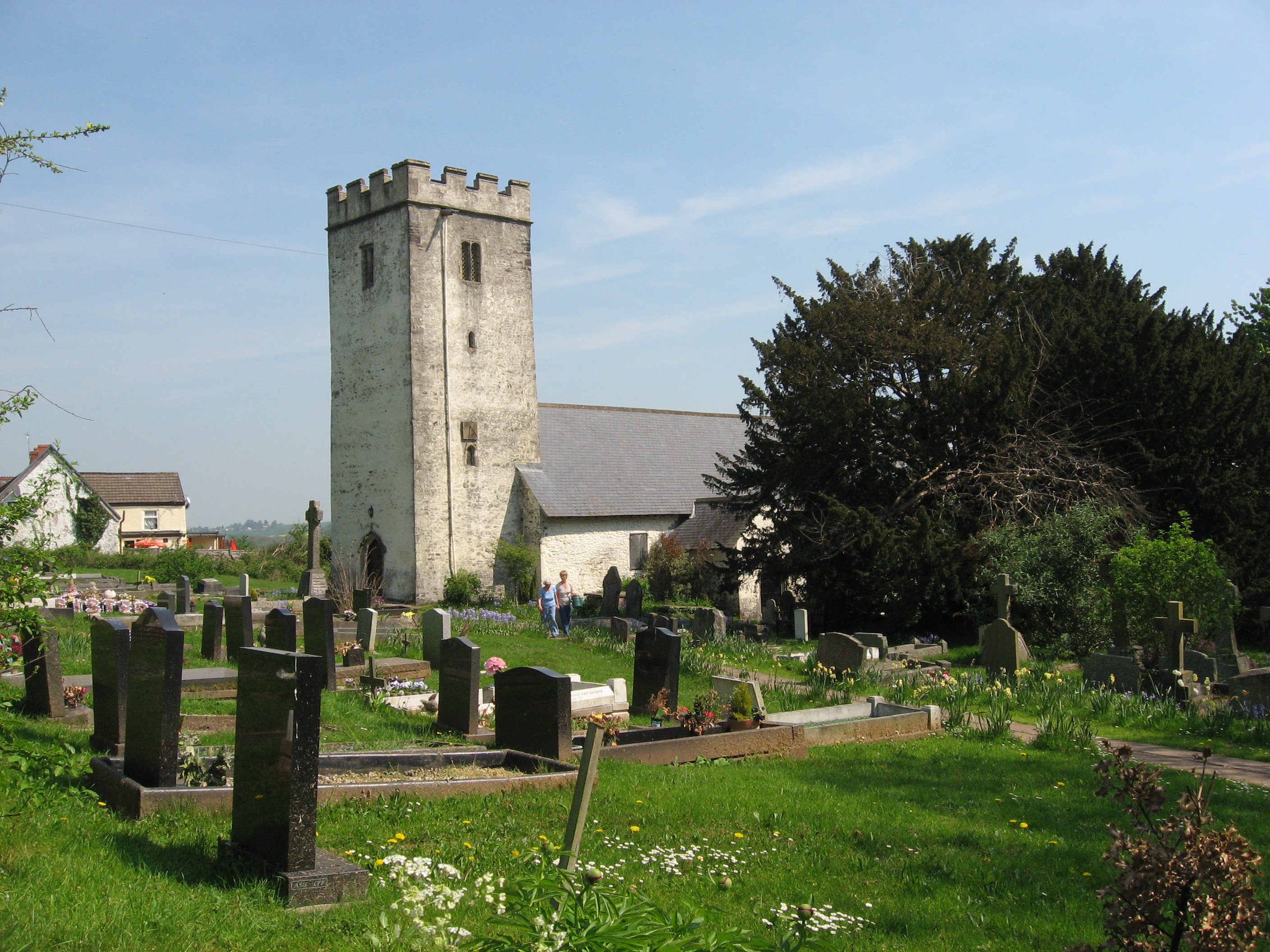
- St Edeyrn
- 51.5314°N 3.125°W
- Denomination: Anglican
- Website: St Edeyrn's Church

History
- Status: Active
- Founded: c. 6th century

Architecture
- Heritage designation: Grade II*
- Designated: 28 January 1963

Specifications
- Materials: stone

Administration
- Diocese: Monmouth
- Parish: Cyncoed

St Edeyrn's Church is a listed Anglican church within the boundary of Old St Mellons, Cardiff, though giving its name to the nearby area of Llanedeyrn.

== Foundation ==
St Edeyrn's is one of a number of ancient Christian sites which were established soon after the founding of Llandaff Cathedral, as the Celtic church was anxious to spread itself through the region as swiftly as possible in order to secure its position. Saint Edeyrn and his associate Saint Isan were amongst the missionaries sent by Saint Teilo to perform this work. Isan founded the church in what is now Llanishen with Edeyrn. Edeyrn later founded a religious community on the banks of the Rhymney River (then Renis River). He is reputedly buried in the churchyard.

== Later history ==
After the Norman Conquest, the church was rebuilt and became a chapel of ease to St Mary's. In the 12th century, it was recognised as the property of Tewkesbury Abbey, but was transferred to the Bishop of Llandaff in 1236, at which time it became a separate parish church. The clergy were appointed by the Chapter of Llandaff Cathedral. From 1671 to 1949 the parish was united with that of St Mellons.

The large Perpendicular windows were added in c. 1500, and the tower soon after. Five of the bells which the tower currently houses date from 1766. An extensive restoration occurred in 1888, when the east chancel wall was completely rebuilt.

== Twentieth century ==
The church was transferred with St Mellons to the new Diocese of Monmouth after the creation of the Church in Wales. Llanedeyrn became a separate parish again in 1949 but in 1979 was renamed 'The Rectorial Benefice of Cyncoed'. St Edeyrn's became a chapel of ease to All Saints' Church, Cyncoed. The benefice was renamed Cyncoed Ministry Area in 2017 and in 2022 was united with the former parishes of Rumney, Llanrumney and St Mellons to form East Cardiff Ministry Area.

The church gained listed status in 1963, after which the machine-made tiles of the roof were replaced with Welsh slate. An additional bell was acquired in 1994.
