= Tabernacle Chapel, Whitchurch =

Chapel in Cardiff, Wales

Tabernacle Chapel
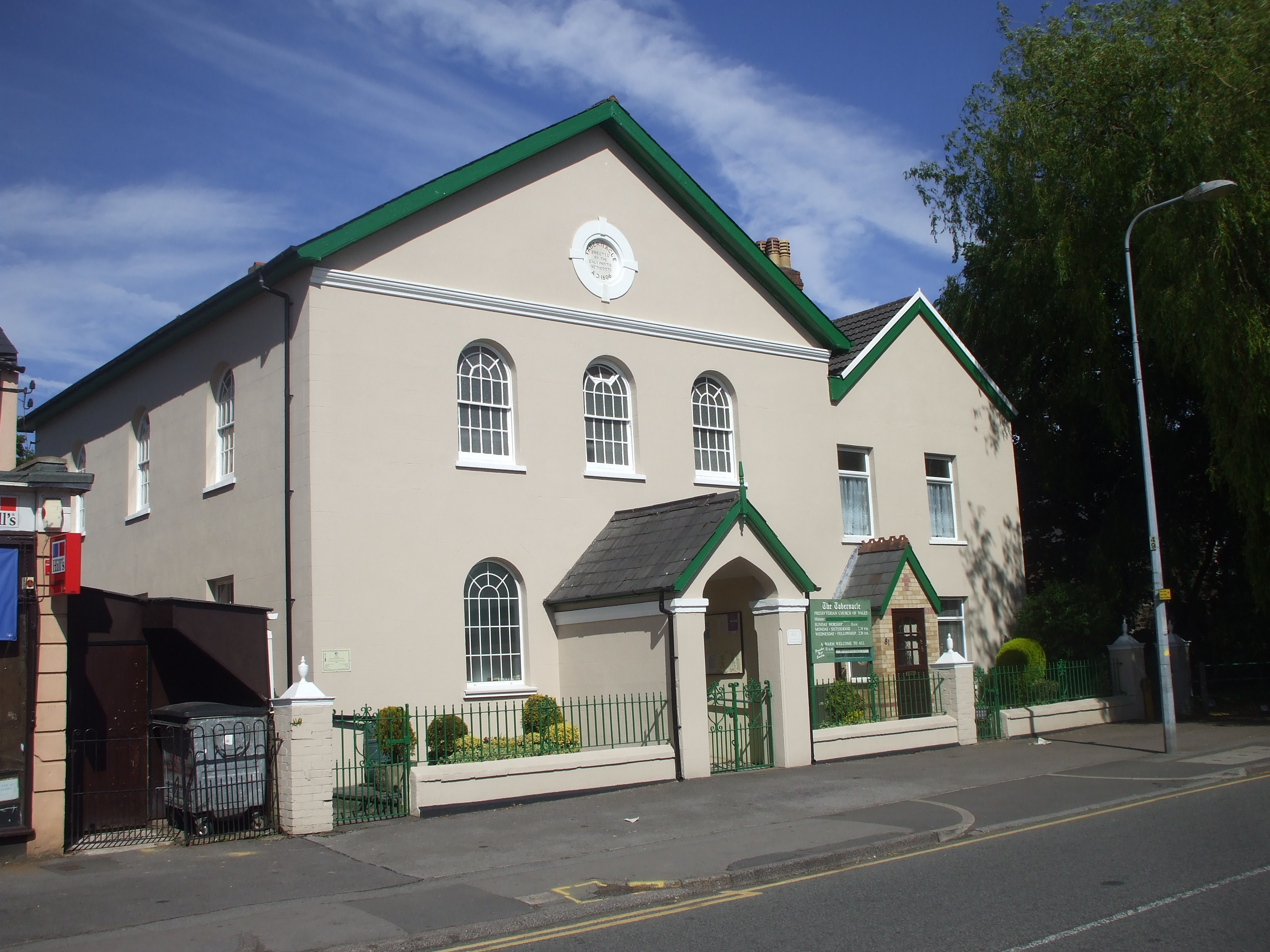
- Tabernacle Chapel, Merthyr Road, Whitchurch, Cardiff
- Tabernacle Chapel
- 51.511383°N 3.216803°W
- Country: Wales
- Denomination: Presbyterian Church of Wales

Listed Building – Grade II
- Official name: Tabernacle Chapel
- Designated: 31 March 1999; Amended 31 May 2002
- Reference no.: 21572

Tabernacle Chapel is a Grade II listed church located on Merthyr Road in Whitchurch, Cardiff, Wales, of the Presbyterian Church of Wales.

== Description and history ==
Located in Whitchurch, Cardiff. It was built in 1866, in a more old fashioned classical design for the time. Its exterior is of painted stucco, while its roof is made of Welsh slate. It was originally a methodist church. It was restructured in 1879 and later again in c. 1900.

In 2011, the church's congregation of the Presbyterian Church of Wales, united with the Fairwater and Cathedral Road churches.
