= City United Reformed Church =

Church in Cardiff, Wales

City United Reformed
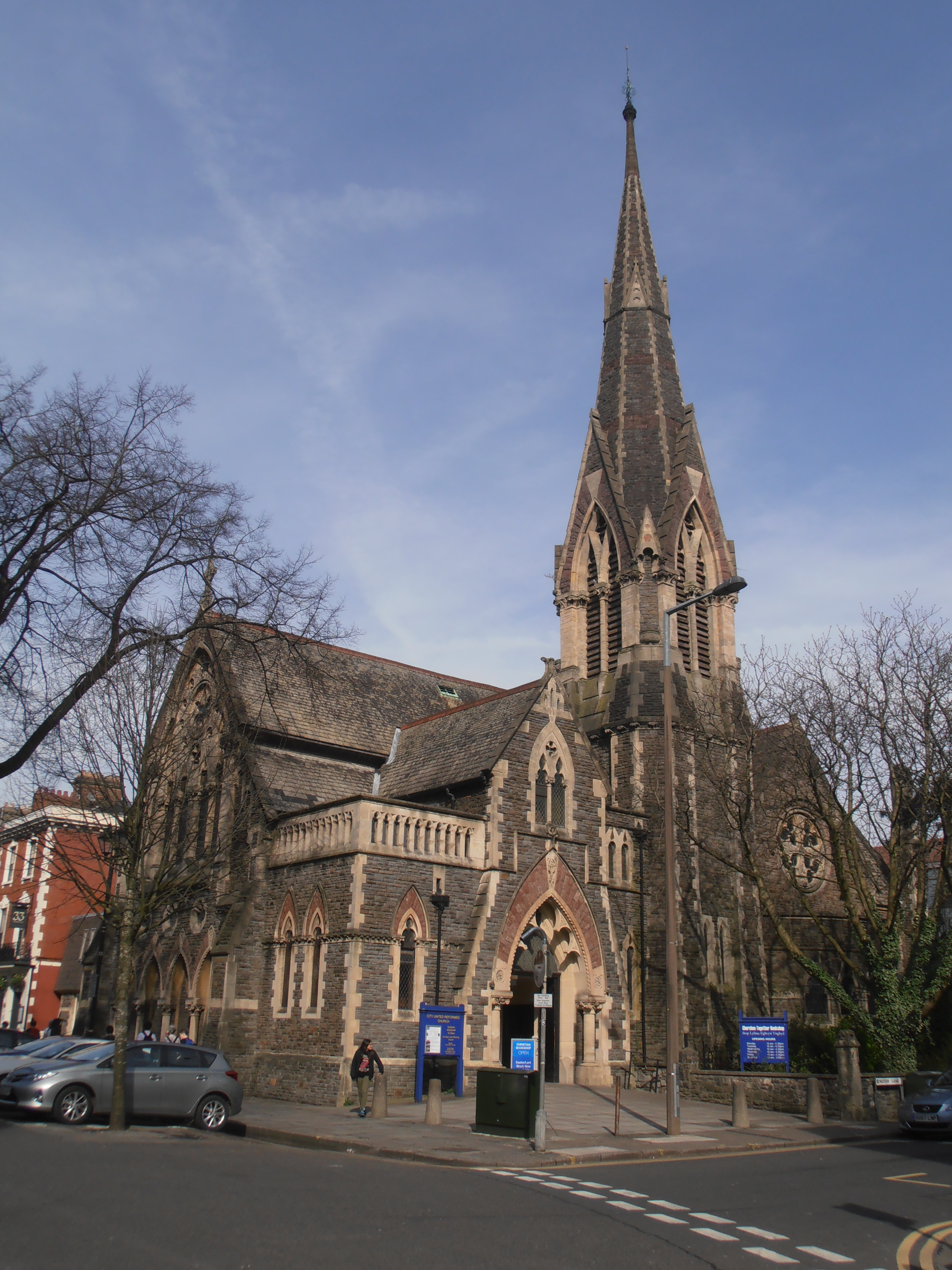
- City United Reformed Church
- City United Reformed
- 51.4839°N 3.1729°W
- Denomination: United Reformed
- Previous denomination: Presbyterian

History
- Status: Active
- Founded: 1864

Architecture
- Heritage designation: Grade II*
- Designated: 19 May 1975
- Architect: F.T. Pilkington
- Style: Neogothic
- Completed: 1866

City United Reformed Church is a Grade II*-listed building located in Windsor Place, Cardiff. Originally constructed in 1866, it was listed in 1975.

The church was designed in a Neogothic style by the Scottish architect Frederick Thomas Pilkington, and originally belonged to the Presbyterian denomination. The same architect was also responsible for Barclay Viewforth Church in Edinburgh. Pilkington made a point of using local materials and created a gabled roof with an octagonal spire. In 1893, the west front was redesigned by another architect, E. M. Bruce Vaughan, who built a new porch. After a fire in 1910, Vaughan added a new hammerbeam roof.

In 1972, when the United Reformed Church was created by a merger of the Congregational Church in England and Wales and the Presbyterian Church of England, City URC became part of the Province of Wales within the new denomination.
