= Sports club =

Organization for the purpose of playing one or more sports

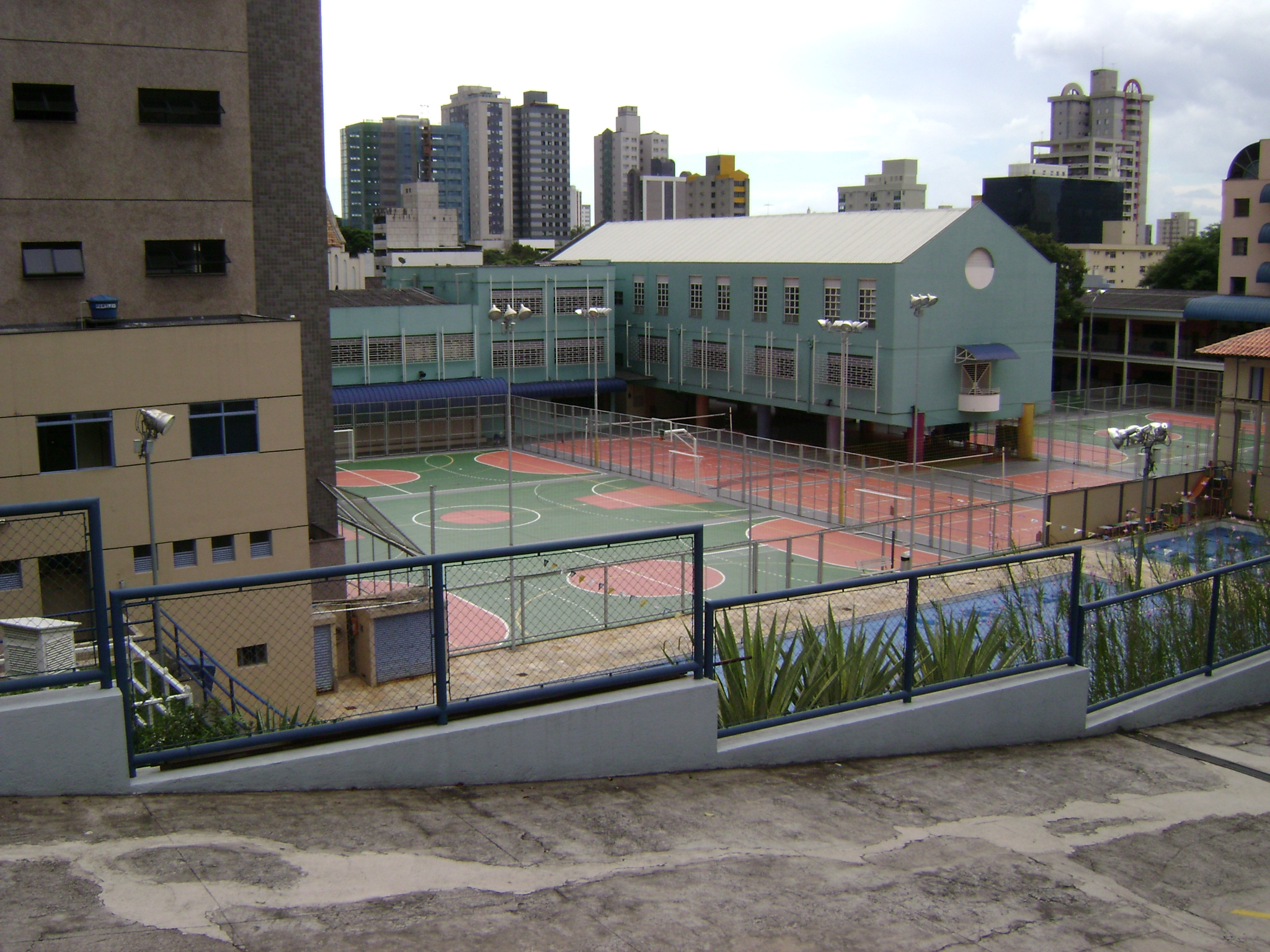
A sport club in Belo Horizonte, Brazil, showing various paved and painted surfaces for futsal, handball, basketball and volleyball, with two swimming pools in the foreground.

A sports club or sporting club, sometimes an athletics club or sports society or sports association, is a group of people formed for the purpose of playing sports.

Sports clubs range from organisations whose members play together, unpaid, and may play other similar clubs on occasion, watched mostly by family and friends, to large commercial organisations with professional players which have teams that regularly compete against those of other clubs and sometimes attract very large crowds of paying spectators. Clubs may be dedicated to a single sport or to several (multi-sport clubs).

The term "athletics club" is sometimes used for a general sports club, rather than one dedicated to athletics proper.

Friedrich Ludwig Jahn's Turner movement, first realised at Volkspark Hasenheide in Berlin in 1811, was the origin of the modern sports clubs.

== Organization ==
Larger sports clubs are characterized by having professional and amateur departments in various sports such as bike polo, football, basketball, futsal, cricket, volleyball, handball, rink hockey, bowling, water polo, rugby, track and field athletics, boxing, baseball, cycling, tennis, rowing, gymnastics, and others, including less traditional sports such as airsoft, billiards, e-sports, orienteering, paintball, or roller derby. The teams and athletes belonging to a sports club may compete in several different leagues, championships, and tournaments wearing the same club colors and using the same club name, sharing also the same club fan base, supporters, and facilities.

Many professional sports clubs have an associate system where the affiliated supporters pay an annuity fee. In those cases, supporters become eligible to attend the club's home matches and exhibitions across the entire season, and have the right to practice almost every kind of sport at the club's facilities. Registered associate member fees, attendance receipts, sponsoring contracts, team merchandising, TV rights, and athlete/player transfer fees, are usually the primary sources of sports club financing. In addition, there are sports clubs, or its teams, which are publicly listed – several professional European football clubs belonging to a larger multisports club are examples of this (namely, Portuguese SADs (Sociedade Anónima Desportiva) such as Sport Lisboa e Benfica and Sporting Clube de Portugal, or Spanish SADs (Sociedad Anónima Deportiva) Real Zaragoza, S.A.D. and Real Betis Balompié S.A.D., as well as Italian clubs like Società Sportiva Lazio S.p.A.).

Some sports teams are owned and financed by a single non-sports company, for example, the multiple sports teams owned by Red Bull GmbH and collectively known as Red Bulls. Other examples of this are the several sports teams owned by Bayer AG and Philips corporations through the Bayer 04 Leverkusen and PSV Eindhoven respectively, that originally were works teams, the teams owned by the Samsung Group (Samsung Sports), and the teams owned by the Anschutz Entertainment Group (AEG). They may compete in several different sports and leagues, being headquartered in some cases across several countries.

== Membership ==
In the field of competitive club sports, an athlete will typically be registered to only one club for a given discipline and will compete for that club exclusively for the duration of a competition or season. Exceptions to this include player trades and transfers, athlete loan agreements, and unattached trialists. Where an athlete competes in multiple disciplines, or where club membership has social or training aspects, such as local athletic clubs, then athletes may register with multiple clubs.

Multiple membership is more common in the case of individual sports, such as the sport of athletics, where a distance runner may compete for a track and field team as well as a road running team, and also have further membership at a local sports club for training purposes. Some national sports bodies require an athlete to state a priority order of their club membership, outlining which club has the higher, or first, claim on the athlete's services.

== Sports clubs around the world ==
In many regions of the world like Europe, North Africa, West Asia, the Indian subcontinent or Central and South America, sports clubs with several sports departments (multisports clubs) or branches, including highly competitive professional teams, are very popular and have developed into some of the most powerful and representative sports institutions in those places. In general, student sports are composed of multisports clubs, with each one representing its educational institution and competing in several sporting disciplines.

In the United States, major institutions like the New York Athletic Club and Los Angeles Athletic Club serve as athletic clubs that participate in multiple sports. Examples also abound of sports clubs that are in effect one sports team. Each team from the NFL (American football), CFL (Canadian football), NBA (basketball), MLB (baseball), NHL (ice hockey) or MLS (association football) North American sports leagues, can be called sports clubs, but in practice, they focus solely on a single sport. There are some exceptions, especially when multiple such teams are under one ownership structure, in which case the club may be referred to as a "sports and entertainment" company; see, for example, the One Buffalo sports club, which fields an NFL team (the Buffalo Bills), two hockey teams (Buffalo Sabres and Rochester Americans), professional lacrosse (Buffalo Bandits), general athletics and fitness (Impact Sports and Performance), and even professional wrestling circuits (such as the Khan family's Jacksonville Jaguars, Fulham F.C., and All Elite Wrestling). Even in such circumstances, collective bargaining agreements and contract laws generally do not allow a player on one sports team within a sports and entertainment company to automatically play for another team in the same company. On the other hand, American varsity teams are generally organized into a structure forming a true multi-sport club belonging to an educational institution, but varsity collegiate athletics are almost never referred to as clubs; "club sports" in American colleges and universities refer to sports that are not directly sponsored by the colleges but by student organizations (see National Club Football Association and American Collegiate Hockey Association for two leagues consisting entirely of college "club" teams in American football and ice hockey, respectively).

In the United Kingdom, almost all major sports organisations are dedicated to a single sport. The exception to this is Cardiff Athletic Club based in Cardiff, Wales, which is the owner of the Cardiff Arms Park site. It is responsible for much of the premier amateur sporting activities in city with cricket (Cardiff Cricket Club), rugby union (it is the major shareholder of the semi-professional Cardiff Rugby Club), field hockey (Cardiff & Met Hockey Club), tennis (Lisvane (CAC) Tennis Club) and bowls (Cardiff Athletic Bowls Club) sections. Catford Wanderers Sports Club is also a multisports organisation, with badminton, cricket, association football, and tennis facilities. In addition, like in several other countries, many universities and colleges develop a wide range of student sport activities, including at a professional or semi-professional level. Fulham F.C. once ran a professional rugby league team and rowing club, which other football clubs have emulated since. Many football clubs originate from cricket teams. Today, most major cities have separate clubs for each sport (e.g., Manchester United Football Club and Lancashire County Cricket Club are based in Manchester).

Many clubs internationally describe themselves as football clubs ("FC", "Football Club" in British English and "Fußball-Club" in German; "CF", Clube de Futebol in Portuguese and Club de Fútbol in Spanish). Generally, British football clubs field only football teams. Their counterparts in several other countries tend to be full multi-sport clubs, even when called football clubs (Futebol Clube do Porto; Fußball-Club Bayern München; Futbol Club Barcelona). The equivalent abbreviation "SC" (for "Soccer Club") is occasionally used in North American English (for example, Nashville SC and Orlando City SC), but many North American teams still use "F.C." in their name instead (e.g. FC Dallas or Toronto FC).

== See also ==
- Boat club
- Community organizations
- Country club
- Health club
- Leisure centre
- Rowing club
- Running club
- Sociedad Anónima Deportiva
- Voluntary Sports Societies of the USSR
- Yacht club
