= Lisvane =

Community in Cardiff, Wales

Lisvane: Welsh: Llys-faen
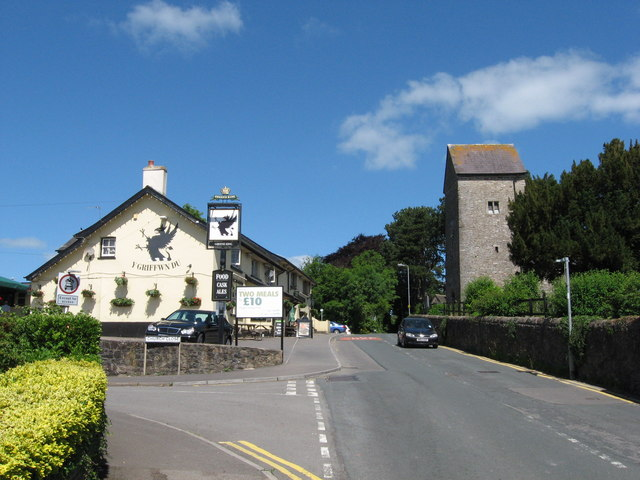
- Church Road, Lisvane

- Location within Cardiff
- Population: 3,707 (2011)
- OS grid reference: ST190830
- Community: Lisvane
- Principal area: Cardiff
- Preserved county: Cardiff
- Country: Wales
- Sovereign state: United Kingdom
- Post town: CARDIFF
- Postcode district: CF14
- Dialling code: +44-29
- Police: South Wales
- Fire: South Wales
- Ambulance: Welsh
- UK Parliament: Cardiff North
- Senedd Cymru – Welsh Parliament: Cardiff North
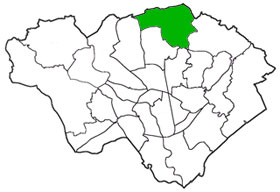
- List of places UK Wales Cardiff 51.55°N 3.16°W

Lisvane (Welsh: Llys-faen) is a community in the north of Cardiff, the capital of Wales, located 5 miles (8 km) north of the city centre. Lisvane is generally considered to be one of the wealthiest residential areas of Wales, with many properties worth in excess of £1 million. Lisvane had 3,319 residents in 2001 and has about 1,700 dwellings, a local village shop, primary school, community cabin library, park, nursery, parish church, public house, war memorial, Scout hall and community or village hall.

== History ==
=== Early history ===
The Welsh language name Llys-faen means 'Stone Court' (llys – court and maen, mutated to faen – stone). There have been several alternative spellings in the English language over the centuries, such as Lysvayen, Lucyvene, Llisuine, Lyssefayn, Lysfayn, Lucyvine, Lucyvenye, Lucyveny, Leysvayen, Les Ffayne and Lliffeni. The village probably settled on the present name from around 1630.

Each early Welsh kingdom was divided into lesser administrative units, cantrefi, which were further subdivided into cymydau (commotes). In each commote the royal taxation house was a large building made almost certainly of stone because it had to be permanent, weather proof and thief proof. The commote of Cibbwr was on land between Cefn Onn ridge and the coast, and most historians agree that Llys-faen was its administrative centre, although Roath has also staked a claim. There is now no indication of the actual whereabouts of the Llys Faen or Stone Court, although various theories have been advanced.

The earthworks at Graig Llwyn is held to be the oldest artificial feature in Lisvane, proposed by several archaeologists to be the remains of an Iron Age stronghold. No definite date or purpose can yet be confirmed for this earthwork.

At the start of the 13th century the parish lands of Llanishen and Lisvane had been divided into Norman manors that were expected to provide food for the castle garrison at Cardiff. The southern facing slopes of the ridge above Lisvane with their rich agricultural land soon became the grain growing area for the supplies which were transported to Roath Mill for processing.

There is a local legend that Oliver Cromwell once stayed at the Black Griffin Inn, prior to the Battle of St Fagans in May 1648 and that the Cromwell family once lived there briefly. There is no evidence to support this, though Cromwell must have lodged somewhere, but it is more likely that the inn's only Cromwellian association is with soldiers of Cromwell's New Model Army. Cromwell was, however, of Welsh ancestry (his real name was Williams) and his great-grandfather came from this area.

=== The Tŷ Mawr ===
Tŷ Mawr is a historic house on the Graig slope overlooking the village. It was built as a farmhouse in the 18th to early 19th centuries and was in the estate of the Lewis family. In 1900 part of the estate was let to Lisvane Golf Club, which established a 9-hole course there; but two years later, the club moved to Radyr, taking the clubhouse with them. From just after the Second World War, the fox hounds of the local Lisvane Hunt were kennelled at Tŷ Mawr until it became a public house in the 1960s.

The Llanishen and Lisvane Hunt had several homes over the years, with the hunts most recently setting off from Llan Farm on Graig Llwyn Road. The village hunt disbanded around 1997 on the death of the hunt's Master.

There is a local tradition that for a period during the 1800s, Erw-wen, on Rudry Road, was also a pub or beer house, possibly called the Red Cow, although no documentary proof has been found.

=== Lisvane and the Cold War ===
A few yards away from the Ordnance Survey's triangulation point on the Graig stands Lisvane's only Cold War nuclear bunker. During World War II the Royal Observer Corps (ROC) observation post stood on the Graig with its clear views over the village and the city of Cardiff. The volunteer ROC observers spotted many German Luftwaffe raids approaching across the channel and activated the air raid warnings in the Cardiff area. In early 1966 a protected nuclear fallout shelter (or bunker) was completed on the site for the ROC (at OS Grid Ref: ST 1898 8508); by the 1960s they had switched from above ground aircraft spotting to underground operations with instruments to detect nuclear explosions and warn the public of approaching radioactive fallout in the event of nuclear war.

The only time observers were mobilised, and volunteers spent nearly ten days underground, was during the Cuban Missile Crisis as the government prepared the country for the potential outbreak of war. The Lisvane nuclear bunker was abandoned by the ROC in 1991 when the Corps itself was disbanded with the end of the Cold War and as a result of recommendations in the government's Options for Change review of UK defence. The Lisvane nuclear bunker still exists, but it was purchased by a mobile phone communications company who built a radio mast inside the fenced compound and sited some of their equipment in the underground facility.

=== Notable domestic architecture ===
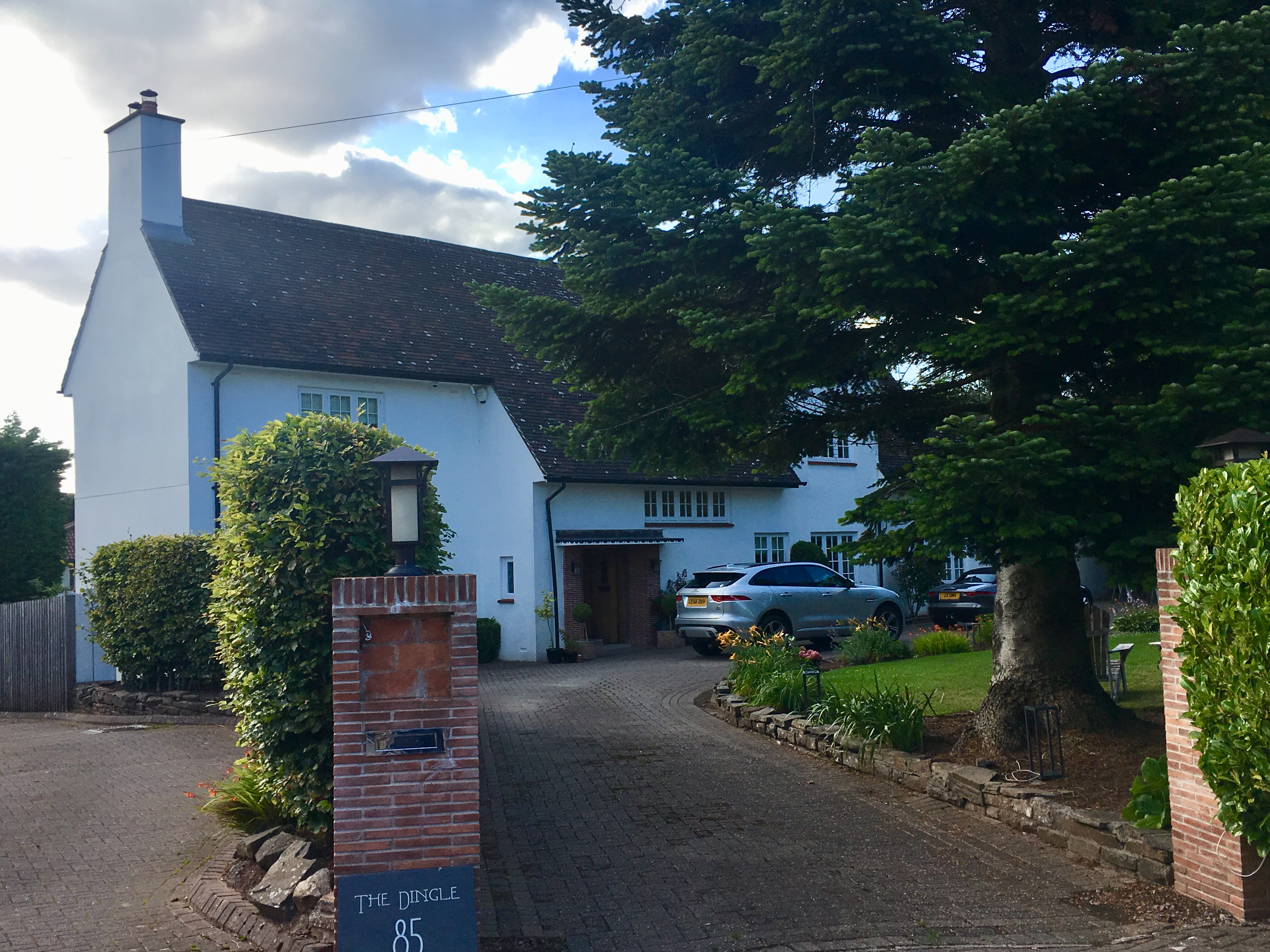
The Dingle in July 2020

Several properties in Lisvane are listed for their historical and architectural significance by Cadw. Ty Gwyn on Lisvane Road was built as the personal residence of builder James E. Turner of E. Turner and Sons and is listed Grade II. The firm was responsible for much of the construction of Cardiff's Cathays Park civic centre. It was latterly the home of financier Julian Hodge. Lisvane House on Mill Road was built in the Arts and Crafts style by architect Edwin Seward. The Dingle is toward the upper end of Mill Road. It was designed by Percy Thomas, and is also listed Grade II.

== Governance ==
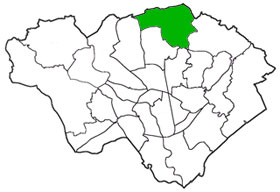
Lisvane electoral ward in Cardiff

=== Community Council ===
The village has an elected community council which is funded by a precept on council tax bills in the local area. It provides support to a number of community services. The council currently has ten councillors (9 Independent, 1 Conservative) with elections held every five years. The last election was held at the same time as the 2017 Cardiff Council election and the next election is due in May 2022.

=== Cardiff Council ward ===
Since 1999 the electoral ward of Lisvane has elected one councillor to Cardiff Council, namely David Walker for the Conservative Party. Before 1999, Lisvane was, with St Mellons and Pontprennau, part of the ward of Lisvane and St Mellons, which elected a single councillor to Cardiff Council. At the 1995 election, Lisvane and St Mellons was the only ward in Cardiff to elect a Conservative councillor. By 1999, the growth of Pontprennau led to the establishment of a separate ward of Pontprennau and Old St. Mellons, which elects two councillors, and Lisvane became a ward on its own.

The ward was bounded by those of Caerphilly county borough to the north; Pontprennau & Old St. Mellons to the east; Pentwyn to the southeast; Llanishen and Cyncoed to the south; and Rhiwbina to the west.

Following a boundary review and a projected population increase, the new community of Thornhill will be transferred from the Llanishen ward to Lisvane, effective from the 2022 Cardiff Council election. The ward will be renamed "Lisvane and Thornhill" and elect three councillors.

=== Senedd ===
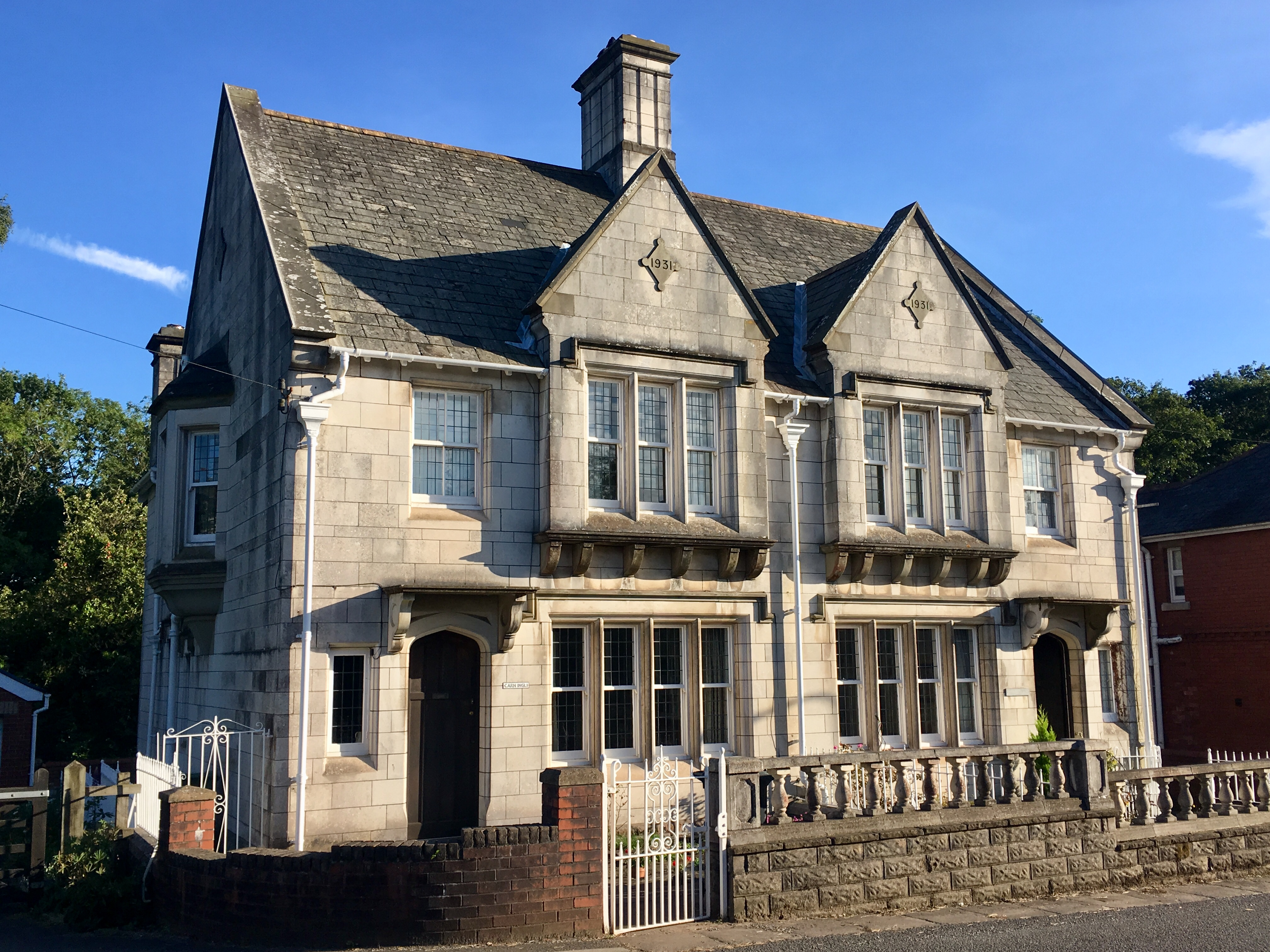
Grade II listed buildings (Carn Ingli (left) and Cerrig Llwyd (right)) in Lisvane

The Senedd representative for Cardiff North is Welsh Labour MS Julie Morgan.

=== Westminster ===
Lisvane lies within the parliamentary constituency of Cardiff North, which has been represented since 2017 by Anna McMorrin (Labour).

== Geography ==
=== Geological structure ===
The surrounding soils are mostly a strong, brown, dry earth, well adapted for arable farming and the growing of grains of all kinds that contributed to the area being a mostly farming community until the modern era. Soils were further enriched over the millennia by alluvial deposits from the meandering River Taff and other smaller tributaries. The substratum under the whole area is a limestone and lime shale that was likely laid down under a warm ocean at some stage in the distant past and subsequently ground down by glaciers during the last ice age around 18,000 years ago.

=== M4 motorway ===
The neighbouring suburbs are Llanishen to the south, Thornhill to the west, Pontprennau to the east, and Lisvane's effective northern border is the M4 motorway. The M4 corridor around Cardiff was announced in 1971 as a replacement for a northern link road that had been proposed since 1947 but never built. The northern 'Lisvane route' for the M4 was eventually chosen after a number of public enquiries and objections from village residents. The new motorway was completed and opened in July 1980.

=== The Graig ===
The Graig is a hill situated north of Lisvane. It borders on Caerphilly. There is also a quarry near the Graig which is now abandoned. The Rhymney Valley Ridgeway Walk runs along the top of the Graig, and has some very good walks and mountain biking routes. Particular favourites for locals include routes to the east to Rudry and the Maenllwyd Inn, and to the west to Caerphilly mountain, The Travellers Rest, and further on to Tongwynlais, Castell Coch and the Taff Trail.

== Demography ==
The United Kingdom Census 2011 showed that the total population of Lisvane was 3,707. The average age was 44.6 years old and 69% of the adult population were married.

Of the 3,707 total, children under the age of 19 accounted for 864 and people over the age of 65 totalled 866.

1,515 were in full-time employment, and 188 of those worked exclusively from home. Of those that travelled to their place of employment 1,090 drove by private car, 74 travelled by train and 43 by bus, 34 walked, 9 cycled and 77 travelled as passengers in other vehicles.

The White population accounted for 92.6% of the residents; of the remainder 4.2% were Asian, 0.5% Chinese, 1.5% were of mixed race and 0.2% were Black.

== Economy ==
There are little in the way of major employers in the village. The area still has a predominantly farming economy. Some local employment is provided by the service industries of the shops and public houses. The general affluence in the village is mainly drawn from employment in the commerce and industry centre of the capital city. An increasing number of employees are working from home via high speed internet links and telephone.

Following improvements in the road and rail infrastructure some Lisvane residents commute daily to work in Bristol or London.

== Landmarks ==
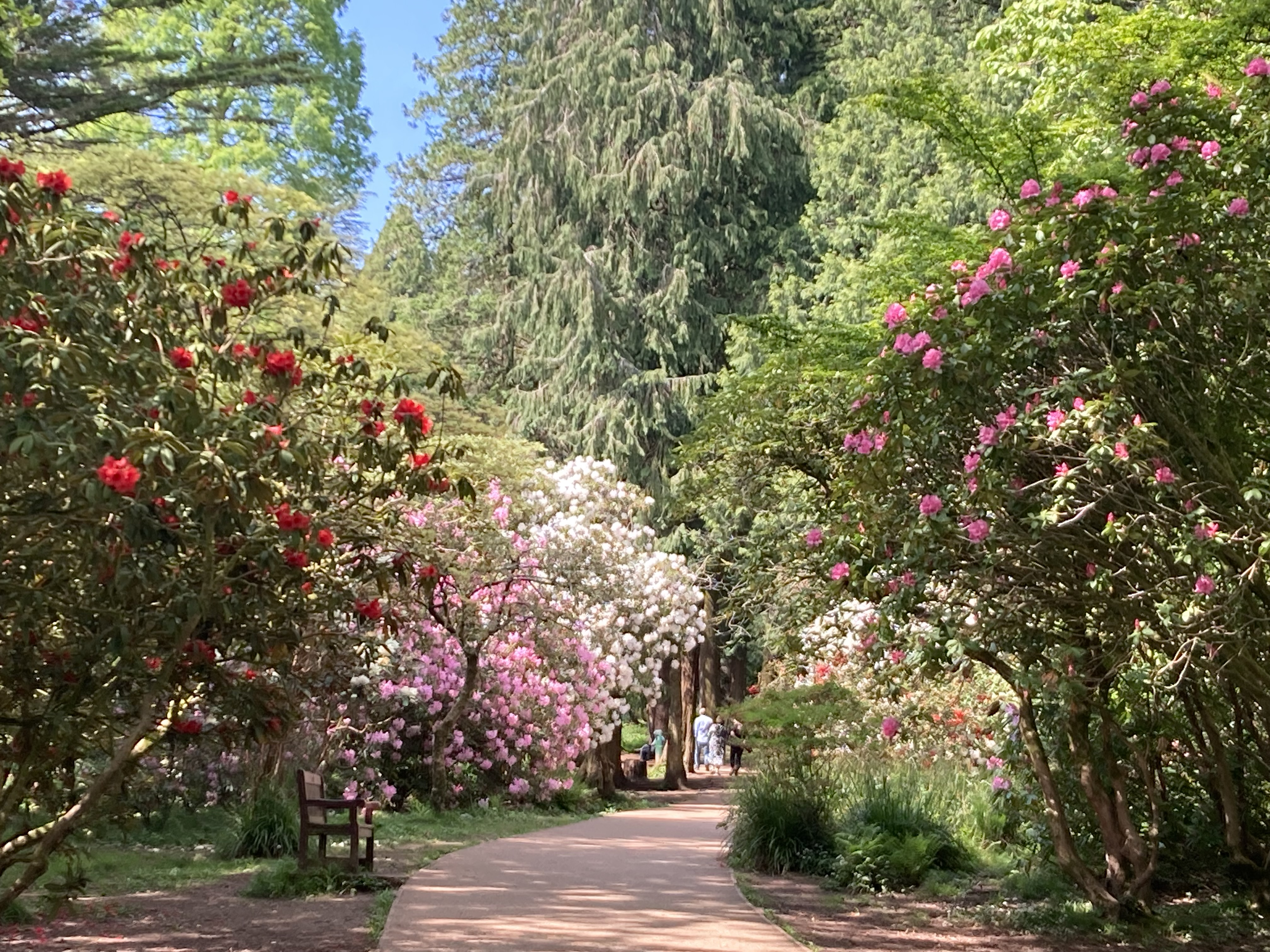
Parc Cefn Onn

- Parc Cefn Onn
- The war memorial
- St Denys Church
- Graig Llwyn earthworks
- The Graig Mountain
- Lisvane Reservoir
- Lisvane (CAC) Tennis Club

== Education ==
Corpus Christi High School is the only secondary school located within Lisvane, just on its boundary with the ward of Cyncoed. However, school age residents fall into the catchment area for Llanishen High School in the ward of Llanishen, which is more accessible.

Llysfaen Primary School serves the local population of 4- to 11-year-olds.

== Religion ==
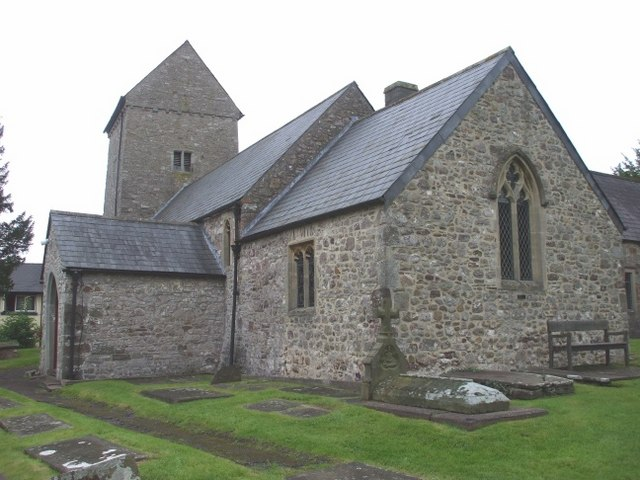
Church of St Denys, Lisvane

St Denys' Church (Church in Wales) in the centre of the village was built in the 12th century and remodelled several times since. The listed building is notable for the imposing and unusual tower with a pitched roof but lacks the normal Norman castellations.

The first Baptist Chapel in Lisvane was built in 1789 on Chapel Road, now renamed Rudry Road, and only stood for less than thirty years until it had to be rebuilt during 1818. Less than forty years later the foundations of the second church were becoming unsafe and a third chapel was constructed, but by 1910 further renovations and repairs were necessary as it had become dilapidated. Lisvane Baptist church now meets in the Memorial Hall on Heol-y-Delyn Road. Methodist services are also held in the Memorial Hall.

Howell Harris, one of the most famous pioneer Calvinistic Methodist ministers, preached regularly during meetings held at several private houses in Lisvane between 1766 and 1769, just before his death.

== Sports and recreation ==
Lisvane Cricket Club was formed in 1976. The club is now based at Llwynarthen in nearby St Mellons. They run 5 adult league sides, with the 1st XI playing in the South East Wales Cricket League Division 2, as well as running youth sides from Under 9 to Under 19.

Lisvane Panthers Junior Football Club fields sides in the under 8 Mini league, the Juniors at 11 – under 16 and an over 16 youth team.

Lisvane Panthers Football Club, home ground Cardiff University pitches in Llanrumney, entered the Lazarou League in 2011. The team won three league and cup doubles (Division 4 in 2012, Division 3 in 2013, Division 2 in 2014) as well as reaching consecutive Lazarou Cup finals in 2013 and 2014.

Lisvane (CAC) Tennis Club is located just north of Lisvane and Thornhill railway station and is the tennis section of the Cardiff Athletic Club.

The nearest rugby union team is in nearby Llanishen.

== Public services and village facilities ==
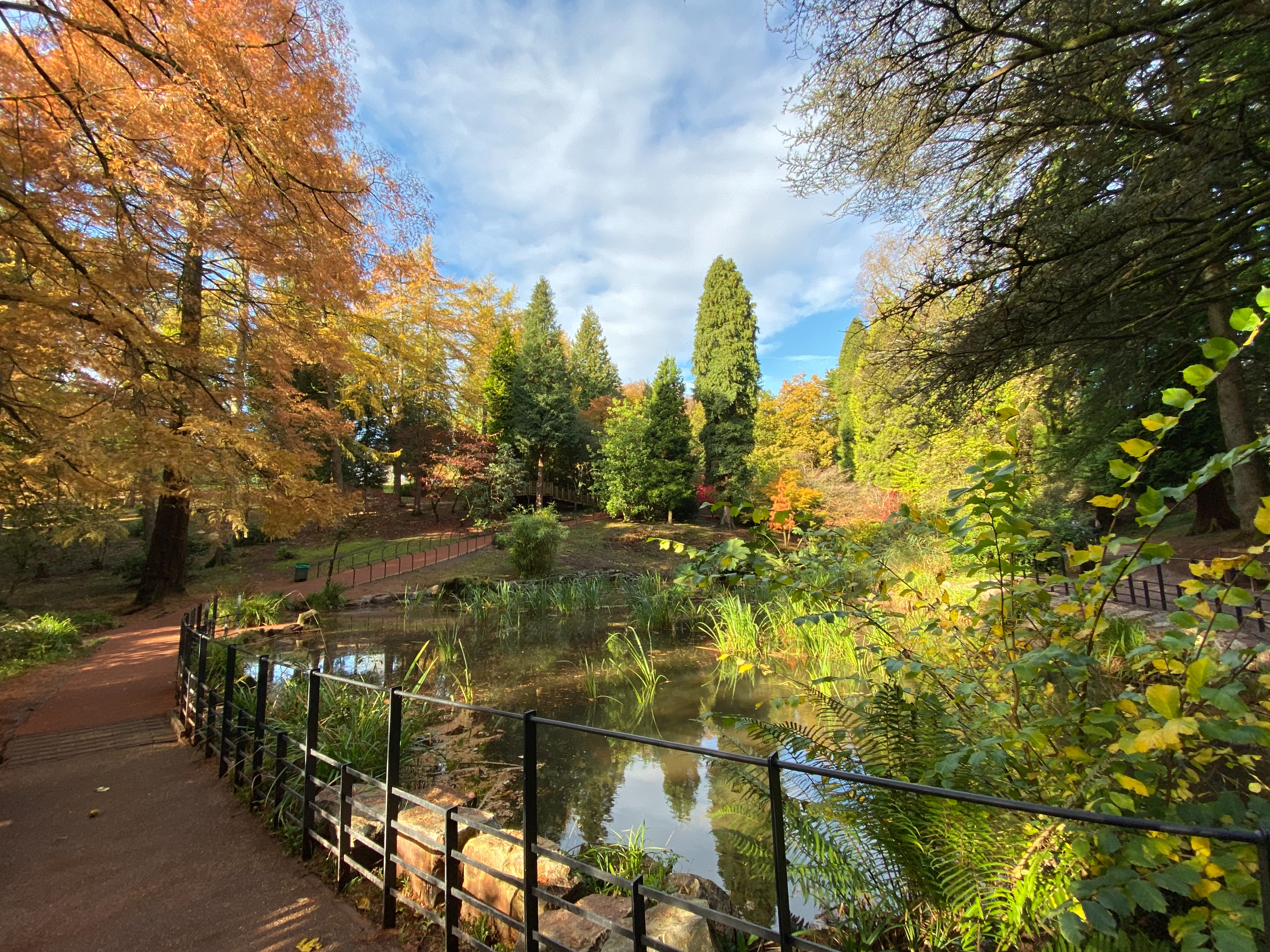
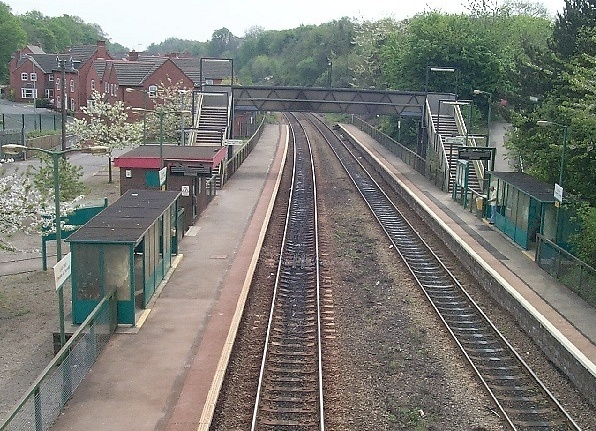
Parc Cefn Onn (left) is a woodland park located near the Lisvane & Thornhill railway station (right).

The area is served by Lisvane & Thornhill railway station with services northbound to Rhymney and southbound to Cardiff Central via Cardiff Queen Street.

Cardiff Bus operates services 27 (Thornhill/Birchgrove/Heath/Cathays), 28 (Llanishen/Roath), and 86 (Llanishen/Heath/Gabalfa/Cathays) from Cardiff Central bus station through the area.

There are two pubs in Lisvane; the Ty Mawr and the Black Griffin, named after the Tredegar House Morgan family's arms that featured a gryphon, sable, segreant, and only recently returned to its traditional name having been called simply The Griffin for many years. There is a third pub called The Old Cottage just across the railway line that divides Thornhill and Lisvane.

A kilometre from the centre of the village is Parc Cefn Onn or Cefn Onn Country Park, an extensive mixed species arboretum, with lakes and woodland walks. The park was laid out around ninety years ago and planted by the railway manager who lived in a large estate near Cefn Onn Halt, at the time Lisvane's tiny "request only" and underused railway station, which closed in 1985 when it was replaced by the current modern railway station closer to the village. Cefn Onn Halt stood a hundred metres away from the railway tunnel that vanishes under Llanishen Golf Club and Caerphilly mountain.

== Notable people with Lisvane connections ==
- Dave Edmunds, musician and record producer, lived in the village in the 1970s and early 1980s.
- Alun Hoddinott, composer, lived in Lisvane until his death in 2008.
- Sir Julian Hodge (1904–2004), founder of the Bank of Wales and the Jane Hodge Foundation. Hodge owned Ty Gwyn and later lived as a tax exile in Jersey.
- Gwilym Jones, Member of Parliament and Under Secretary of State for Wales, 1992–1997, lives in Lisvane.
- Robert Rogers, Baron Lisvane, Clerk of the House of Commons, 2011–14.
- John Tabatabai, poker player, previously lived in Lisvane.
- Joe Jacobson, footballer, grew up in Lisvane.
- Rhys Griffiths, footballer, grew up in Lisvane.
- Jimmy Floyd Hasselbaink, footballer, lived in Lisvane whilst playing for Cardiff City.
- Luke Rowe, cyclist for SKY. Attended Llysfaen Primary School.
