= Cardiff Athletic Bowls Club =

Welsh sports club

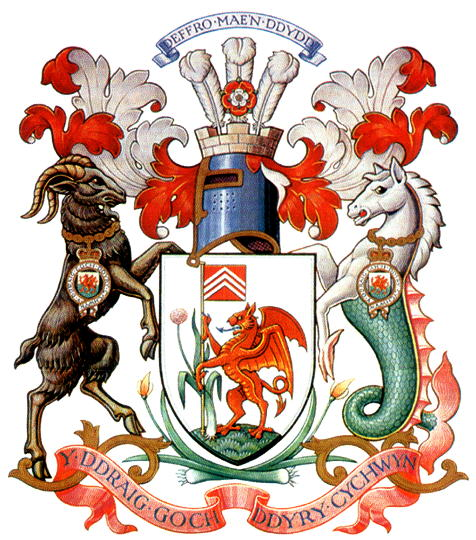

Team information
- Founded: 1923; 102 years ago
- Home ground: Cardiff Arms Park
- Official website: cabcbowls.co.uk

Cardiff Athletic Bowls Club also known as the Cardiff Bowls Club and the Cardiff Athletic Club – Bowls Section is a bowls club based at Cardiff Arms Park, Cardiff, Wales.

Cardiff Athletic Bowls Club is a section of the Cardiff Athletic Club, which includes the Rugby Section (Cardiff Rugby Football Club, which is managed by Cardiff Rugby Football Club Limited with Cardiff Athletic Club as the major shareholder), the Cricket Section (Cardiff Cricket Club), the Hockey Section (Cardiff & Met Hockey Club) and the Tennis Section (Lisvane (CAC) Tennis Club).

== History ==
The Bowls Pavilion and Bowling Green at Cardiff Arms Park

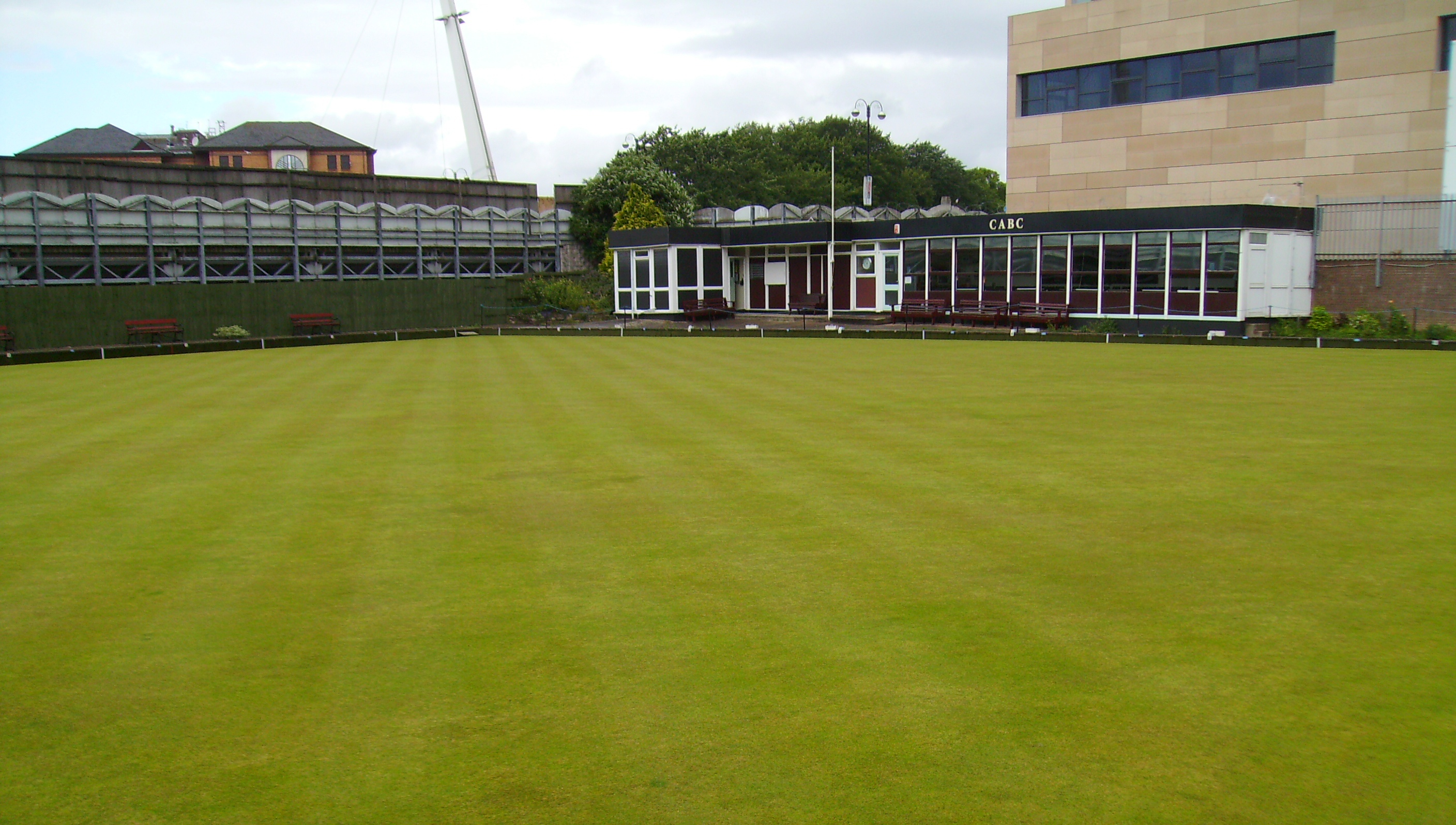
The pavilion and bowling green

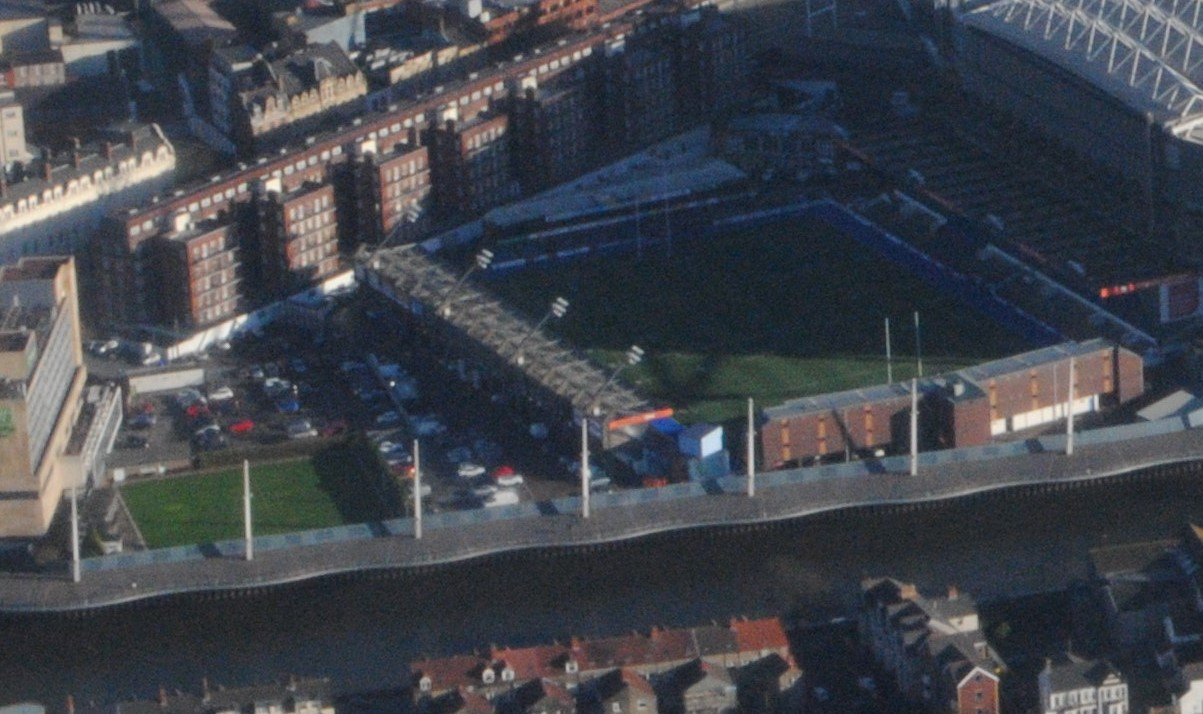
The bowling green (left) and the rugby ground (right)

Cardiff Athletic Bowls Club (CABC) was established in 1923, and ever since then, the club has used the Arms Park as its bowling green. The bowls club is a section of the Cardiff Athletic Club and shares many of the facilities of the Cardiff Arms Park athletics centre.

The Club has produced two Welsh international bowlers; Mr. C Standfast in 1937 and Mr. B Hawkins who represented Wales in the 1982 World Pairs and captained Wales in 1982 and 1984.

== Proposed redevelopment of Cardiff Arms Park ==
An agreement in principle was reached in December 2015 between the landlord of the stadium site (Cardiff Athletic Club) and its tenant (Cardiff Blues) to give the club a 150-year lease on the stadium site. More detailed negotiations will begin with a final approval expected early in 2016. If the final agreement goes ahead, Cardiff Athletic Club would receive an upfront payment of approximately £8 million. As part of the agreement, CABC would have to vacate its current site at the Arms Park and move to a new facility. At present Cardiff Blues pay Cardiff Athletic Club rent of around £115,000 per annum, however this would nearly double to around £200,000.

== See also ==
- Sport in Cardiff
