= Ty Gwyn, Lisvane =

House in Lisvane, Cardiff, Wales

Ty Gwyn
- Tŷ Gwyn
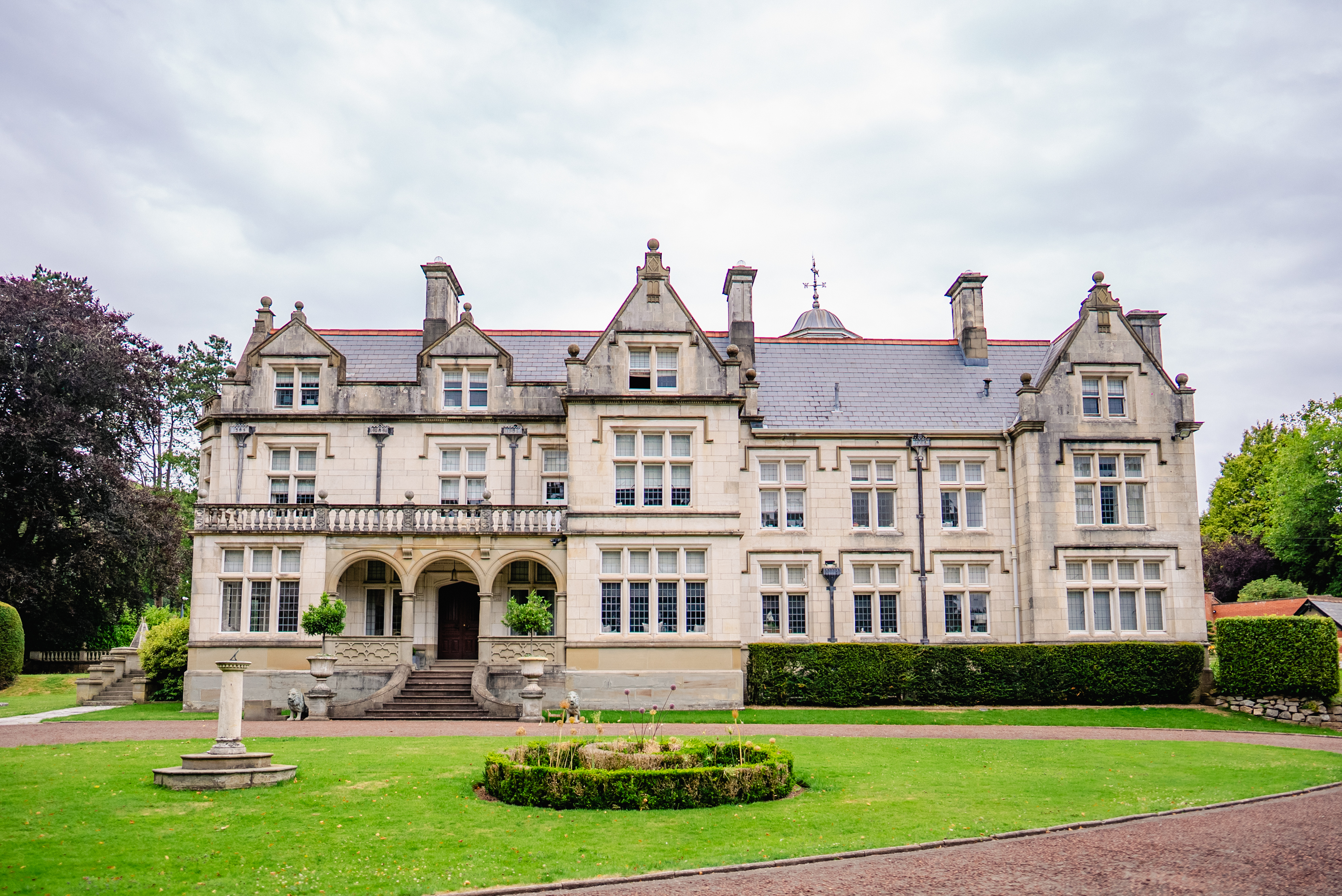
- The front of the house in 2025
- Interactive map of the Ty Gwyn area

General information
- Location: Ty Gwyn, Lisvane, Cardiff, Wales
- Coordinates: 51.53826°N 3.17124°W

Technical details
- Size: 10,000 square feet (930 m^{2})
- Grounds: 5 acres (2.0 ha)

Cadw/ICOMOS Register of Parks and Gardens of Special Historic Interest in Wales
- Official name: Ty Gwyn
- Designated: 1 February 2022; 4 years ago
- Reference no.: PGW(Gm)76(CDF)
- Listing: Grade II*

Listed Building – Grade II
- Official name: Ty Gwyn
- Designated: 13 September 2002; 23 years ago
- Reference no.: 26942

Listed Building – Grade II
- Official name: Coach House at Ty Gwyn
- Designated: 31 August 2018; 7 years ago
- Reference no.: 87733

Ty Gwyn is a large detached house in the Cardiff suburb of Lisvane. It is set in 5 acres (2.0 ha) of grounds and is 10,000 square feet (930 m^{2}) in size.

Ty Gwyn House was built by James Ephraim Turner as his personal residence in 1906 in the Jacobethan style. Turner was the senior partner of the Cardiff building firm E. Turner and Sons, whose company built much of the Cathays Park civic centre of Cardiff. The house is constructed of Portland stone; with interior furnishings of Wainscot panelling made from Austrian oak. A one-storey extension to the rear of the main house has Gothic detailing and dates from 1932. It is Grade II-listed. The house was illustrated in the 1929 pamphlet Superb Buildings which depicted E. Turner and Sons' projects in Cardiff. The mansion house has been listed Grade II since September 2002. Its gardens are designated Grade II* on the Cadw/ICOMOS Register of Parks and Gardens of Special Historic Interest in Wales.

On 2 and 3 July 1908 a garden fête was held at Ty Gwyn to raise funds for the construction of the Baptist chapel at Llanishen. The fête was opened by the Liberal MP Alfred Thomas: entertainment was provided by the artistes of Clara Novello Davies, the Llanishen Brass Band and the Capel Gwilym Choir. The house was purchased by his cousin, the shipping merchant Douglas Smith (1894–1961), of the Reardon Smith Shipping Company in 1937. To survey his ships transiting the Bristol Channel, Smith constructed an octagonal room on the roof of Ty Gwyn.

Ty Gwyn was bought by the banker and financier Julian Hodge in 1961. It became the headquarters of his charitable foundation, named after his mother, Jane Hodge (née Simcocks).

In 2014 Ty Gwyn was put up for sale for the first time in 50 years, with an asking price of £3 million. It was sold in November 2017 for £2 million. A dayroom, cinema, gym and a garage for four cars was added to the house by Davis Sutton Architects following its sale in 2015. A new entrance to the house was created after the separation of the coach house and gate lodge. The coach house of Ty Gwyn was developed as a private residence in the 2010s. It is believed to have the first vehicle inspection pit in Wales. It has a datestone of 1905 and decorative tiles on the external walls.

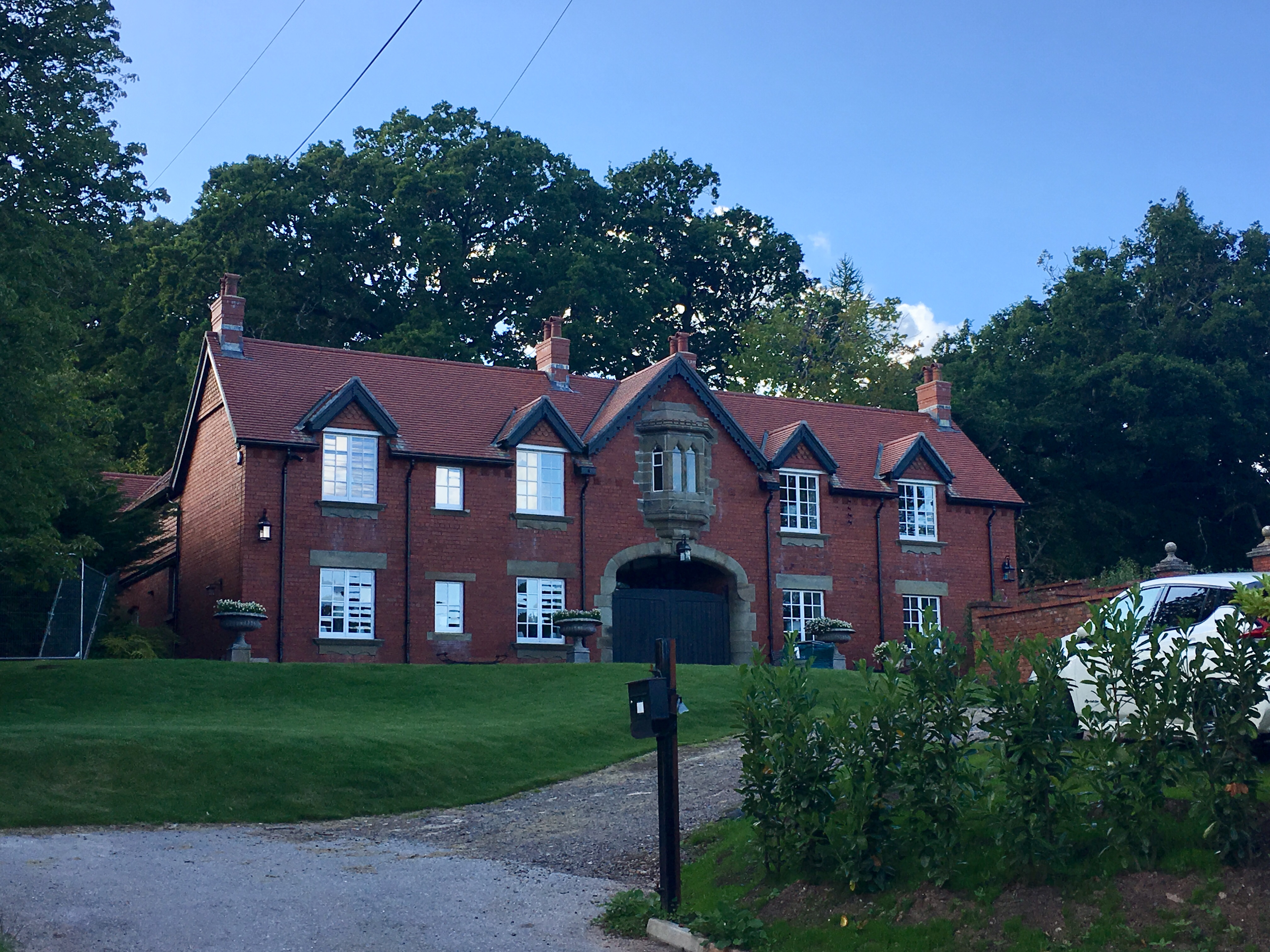
The coach house of Ty Gwyn in July 2020
