= Cardiff Athletic Club =

Wales-based multi sport organisation

Coordinates: 51.4795°N 3.1821°W

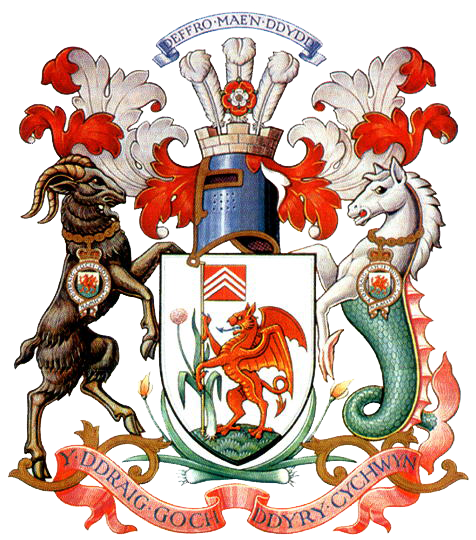

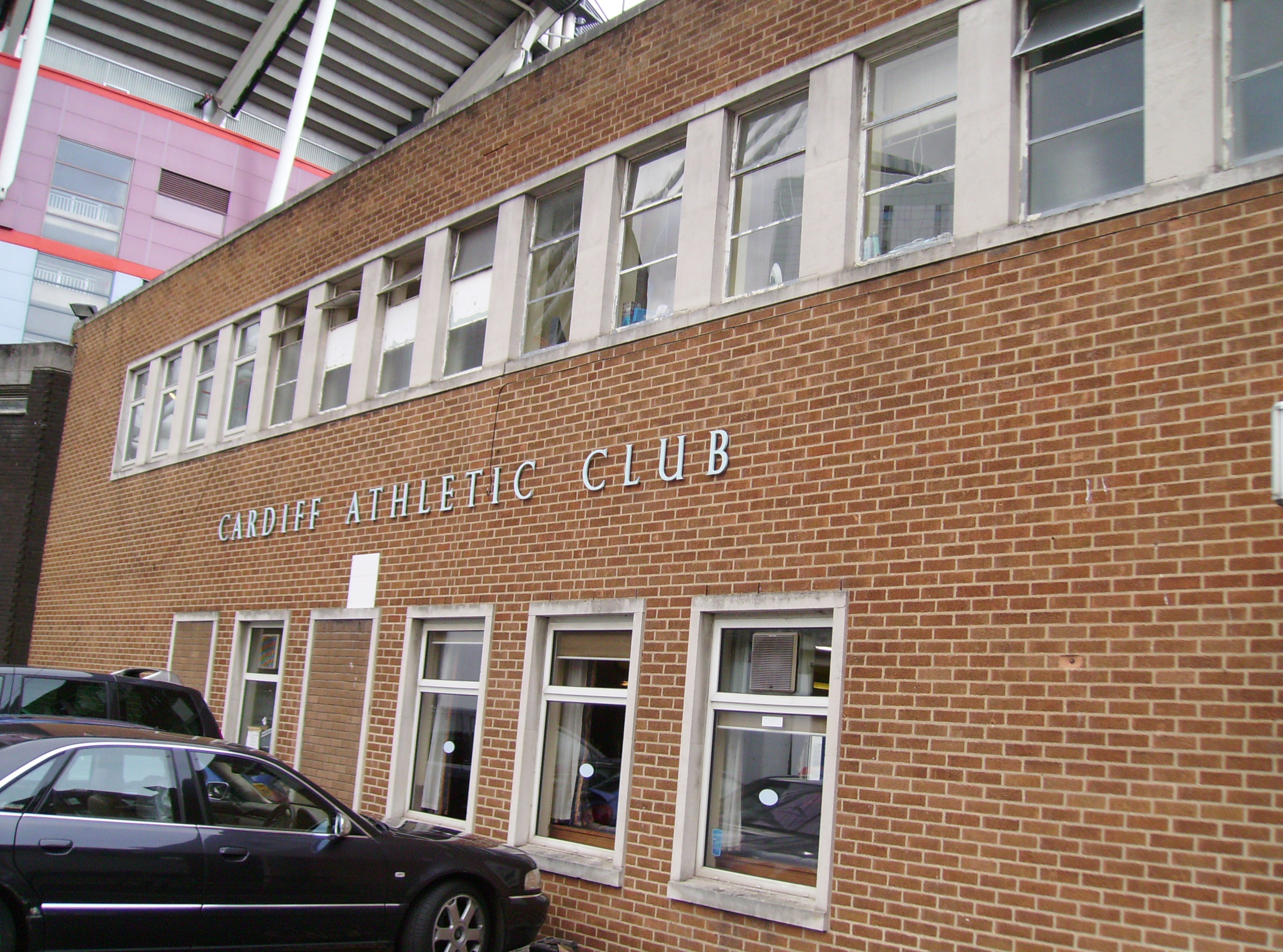
- Cardiff Athletic Club, adjacent to the Millennium Stadium (top left)
- Formation: 1922; 104 years ago
- Merger of: Cardiff Rugby Football Club and Cardiff Cricket Club
- Headquarters: Cardiff Arms Park, Westgate Street, Cardiff, Wales
- Chairman: Keith Morgan
- Website: www.cardiffathleticclub.co.uk

Cardiff Athletic Club (CAC) is a multi-sport club based in Cardiff, Wales. It is the owner of the Cardiff Arms Park site, and a major shareholder of Cardiff Rugby Football Club Ltd and therefore has a large influence over the rugby club's two sides.

Cardiff Athletic Club was established in 1922, and has been the main body responsible for much of the premier amateur sporting activities in Cardiff. The Athletic Club has bowls, cricket, field hockey, rugby union, and tennis sections.

== History ==
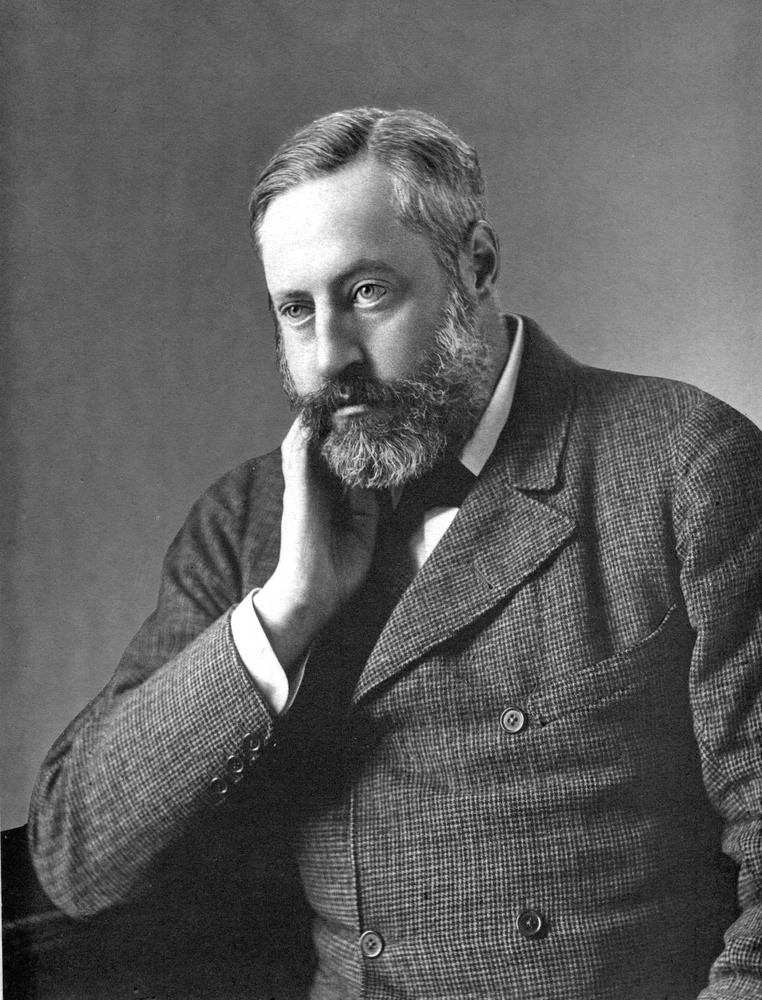
3rd Marquess of Bute. The Bute family had previously owned Cardiff Arms Park

In 1922 Cardiff Football Club, later renamed Cardiff Rugby Football Club, and Cardiff Cricket Club amalgamated to form the Cardiff Athletic Club. Before that in 1878, the two Clubs had been granted the use of Cardiff Arms Park at a peppercorn rate, by the 3rd Marquess of Bute, who owned the site at the time. The two clubs wanted to preserve their grounds, so the cricket and rugby clubs joined forces, and created the Cardiff Athletic Club. The Athletic Club purchased the site from the 4th Marquess of Bute, apart from a strip of land adjoining Westgate Street, for £30,000 on the understanding that the site should be preserved for recreational purposes only. By 1935, the 4th Marquis of Bute built a new block of flats on his land adjoining Westgate Street.

There had been previous attempts to merge the clubs, in November 1892 and between 1902 and 1904, when the two clubs worked closely to fund a new pavilion to serve the needs of both clubs, but it was not until 1922 that the merger finally took place. Later the Cardiff Arms Park Company Limited was formed by Cardiff Athletic Club, Arms Park (Cardiff) Greyhound Racing Company Limited and the Welsh Rugby Union (WRU). By 1933 the Cardiff Athletic Club acquired a 99-year lease from the Cardiff Arms Park Company Limited on a rental of £200 per annum.

Since the 1930s, Cardiff Arms Park has changed considerably, with new facilities and amenities, but it was the building of the National Stadium which would see the greatest change for the Cardiff Athletic Club. After an agreement between Cardiff Athletic Club and the WRU, the freehold of the rugby ground was transferred solely to the WRU in July 1968. Work could then begin on the new National Stadium. Glamorgan County Cricket Club and the cricket and hockey sections of the Athletic Club moved to Sophia Gardens in 1967, and by 1995 the cricket section moved again to the Diamond Ground in Whitchurch, Cardiff., although the hockey section still play at the Sophia Gardens complex. This allowed the cricket ground to be demolished and a new rugby union stadium built on the same site for Cardiff RFC, who would move out of the old rugby ground, allowing the National Stadium to be built, for the sole use of the Wales national rugby union team. By 1999, the National Stadium had been replaced by the Millennium Stadium.

== Present day ==
Cardiff Athletic Club has five sports sections;

- bowls section (Cardiff Athletic Bowls Club (CABC)). The Club was established in 1923, and ever since then, the club has used the Cardiff Arms Park as its bowling green.
- cricket section (Cardiff Cricket Club). The Club was established in 1819. The club initially played on various cricket grounds, mostly in eastern Cardiff, due to better drainage. The club then moved to Cardiff Arms Park. Cardiff Cricket Club played their final game at Cardiff Arms Park against Lydney Cricket Club on 17 September 1966. In 1998, Cardiff Athletic Club sold the Sophia Gardens ground to Glamorgan County Cricket Club and the cricket section of Cardiff Athletic Club (Cardiff Cricket Club) for many years had no fixed cricket ground, while they were looking for a suitable cricket ground. In 1997 the club moved to their permanent home of the Diamond cricket ground at Forest Farm, Whitchurch, Cardiff and by July 2007 a new pavilion had been built on the ground.
- hockey section (Cardiff & Met Hockey Club including the Cardiff Athletic Ladies Hockey Club),
- rugby section (Cardiff Rugby Football Club as its major shareholder. The club was founded in 1876 and played their first few matches at Sophia Gardens, shortly after which relocating to Cardiff Arms Park where they have been based ever since. Cardiff Athletic Club also has a minority shareholding in Cardiff Rugby) and
- tennis section (Lisvane (CAC) Tennis Club). Tennis was first played on Cardiff Arms Park in 1867. The tennis club joined with the existing rugby and cricket sections of CAC in the mid-twenties. Cardiff Tennis Club relocated to a new permanent location in 2003 by amalgamating with the Lisvane Tennis Club based in North Cardiff to form the Lisvane (CAC) Tennis Club.

Each section is represented on the Management Committee of the Club. The Athletic Club is one of the few multi-sport clubs in the United Kingdom.

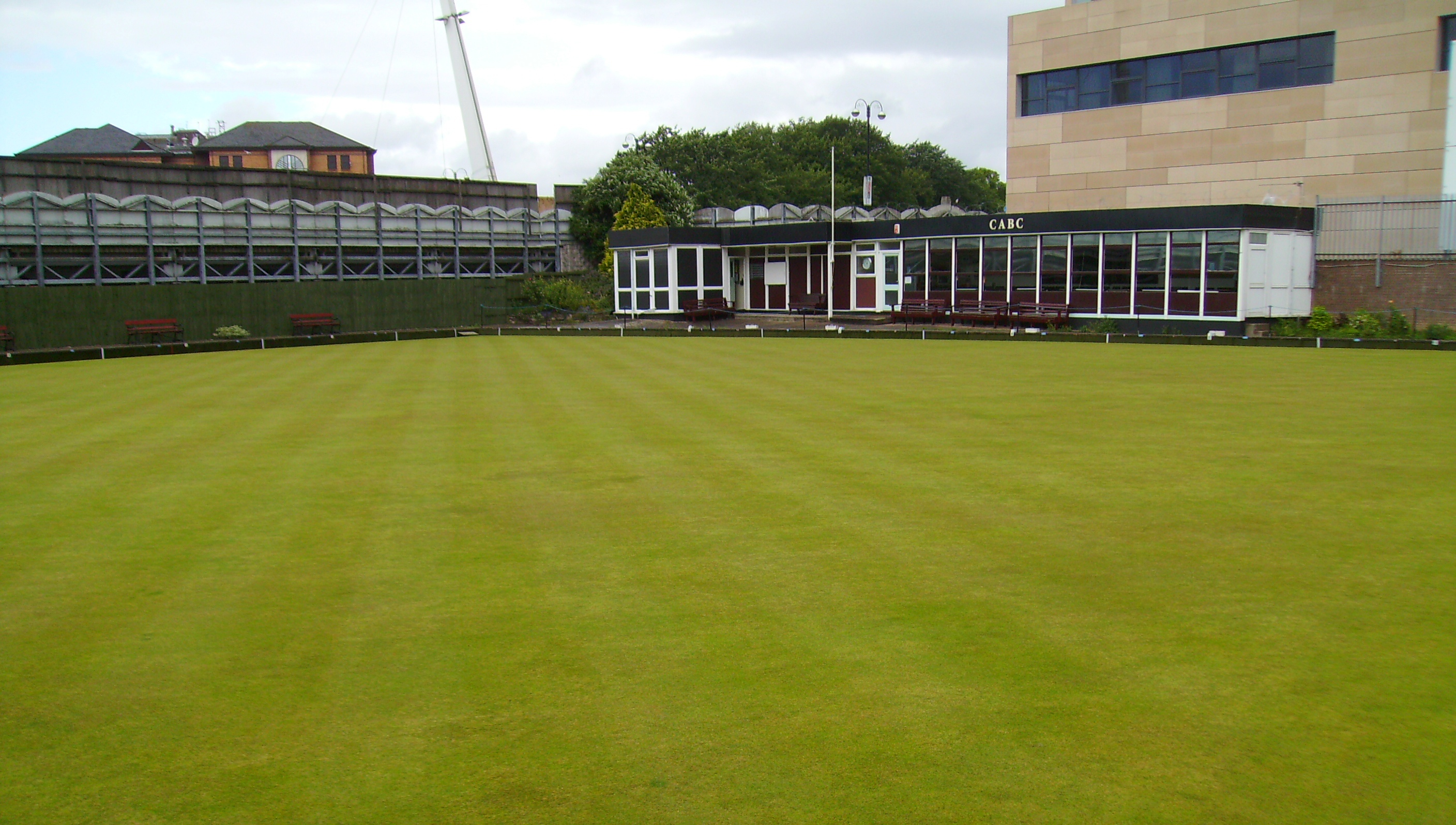
The Bowls Section
(Cardiff Athletic Bowls Club)
play at the Cardiff Arms Park bowling green

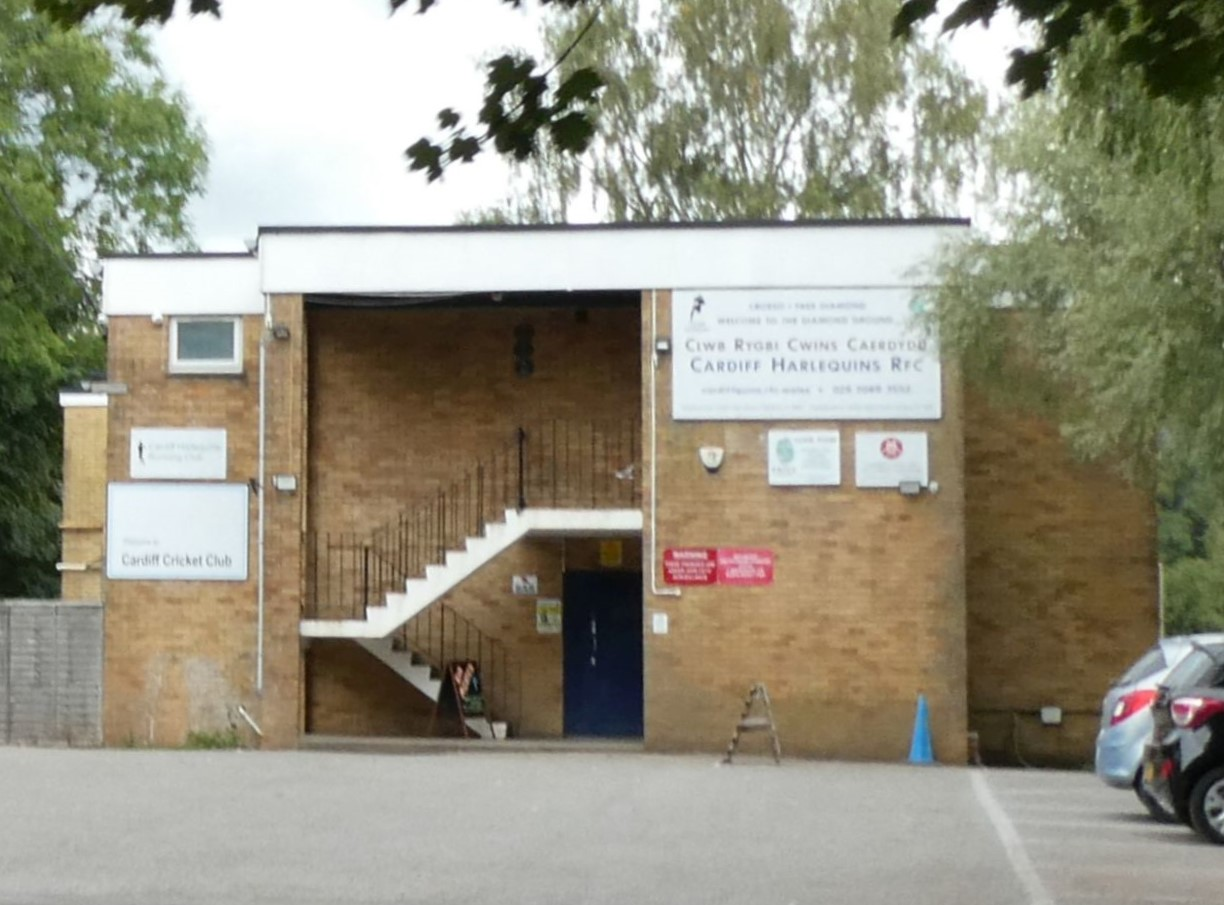
The Cricket Section
(Cardiff Cricket Club)
play at the Diamond Cricket Ground

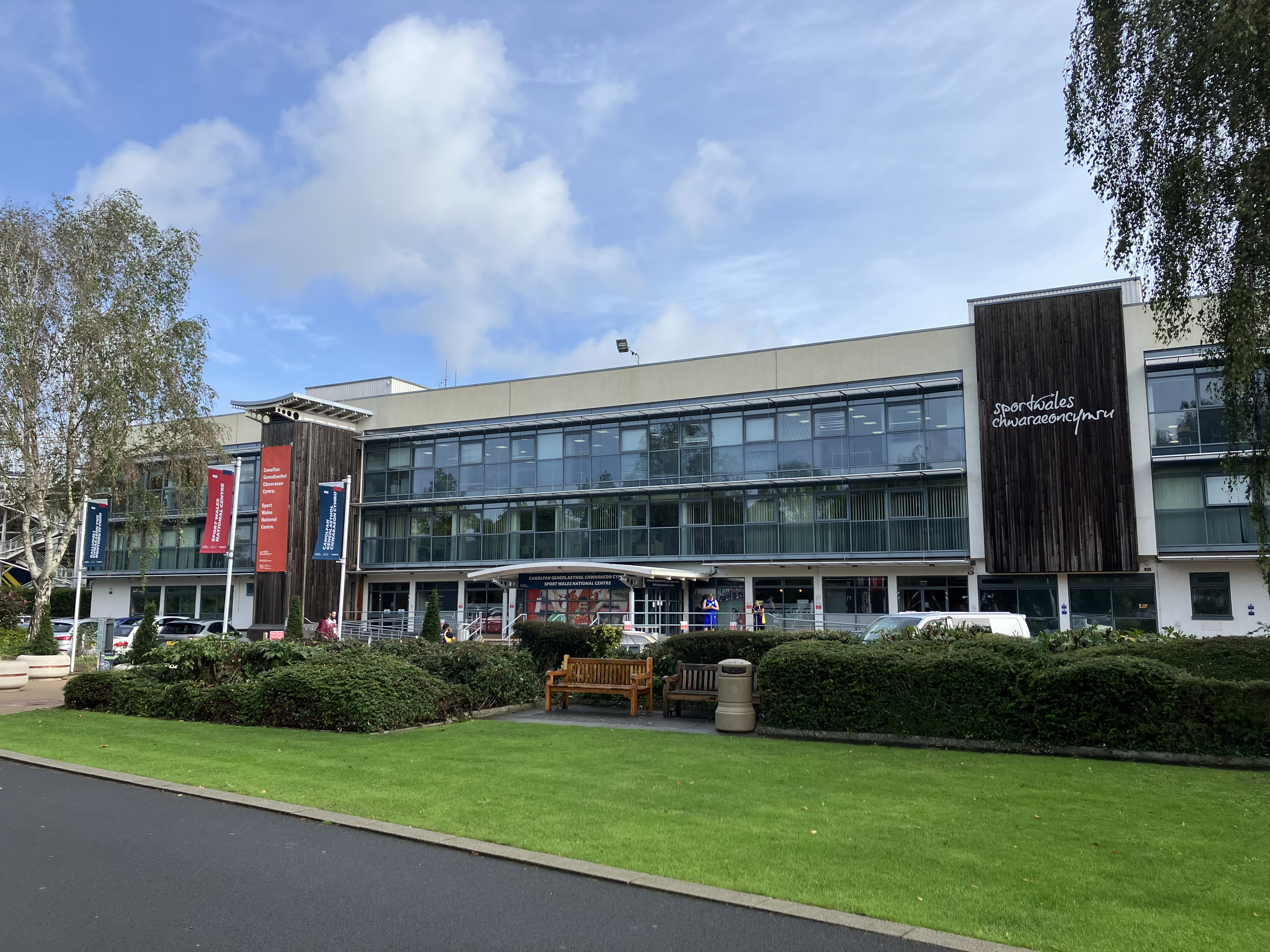
The Hockey Section
(Cardiff & Met Hockey Club)
play at the National Hockey Centre

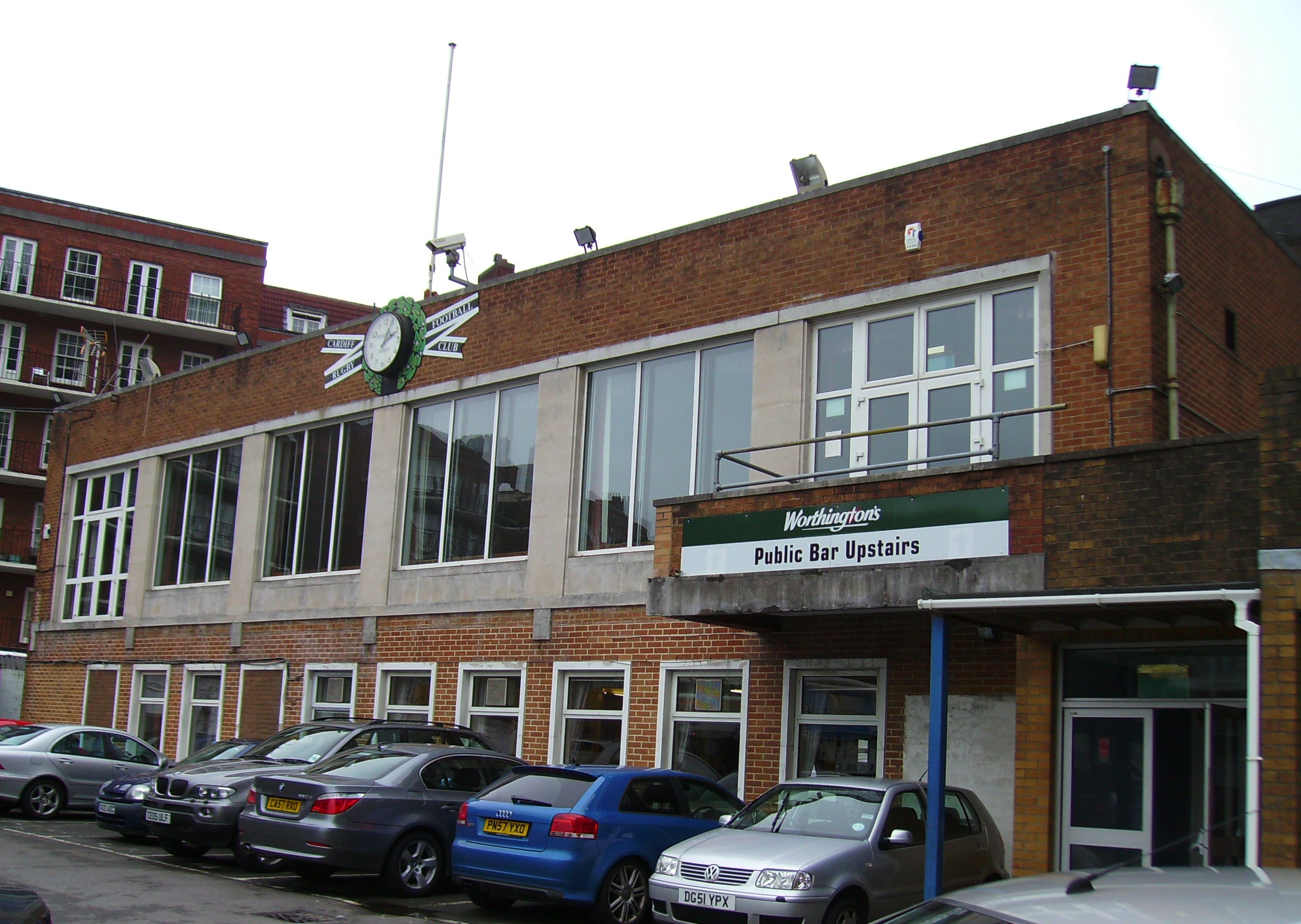
The Rugby Section
(Cardiff Rugby Football Club)
play at Cardiff Arms Park rugby ground

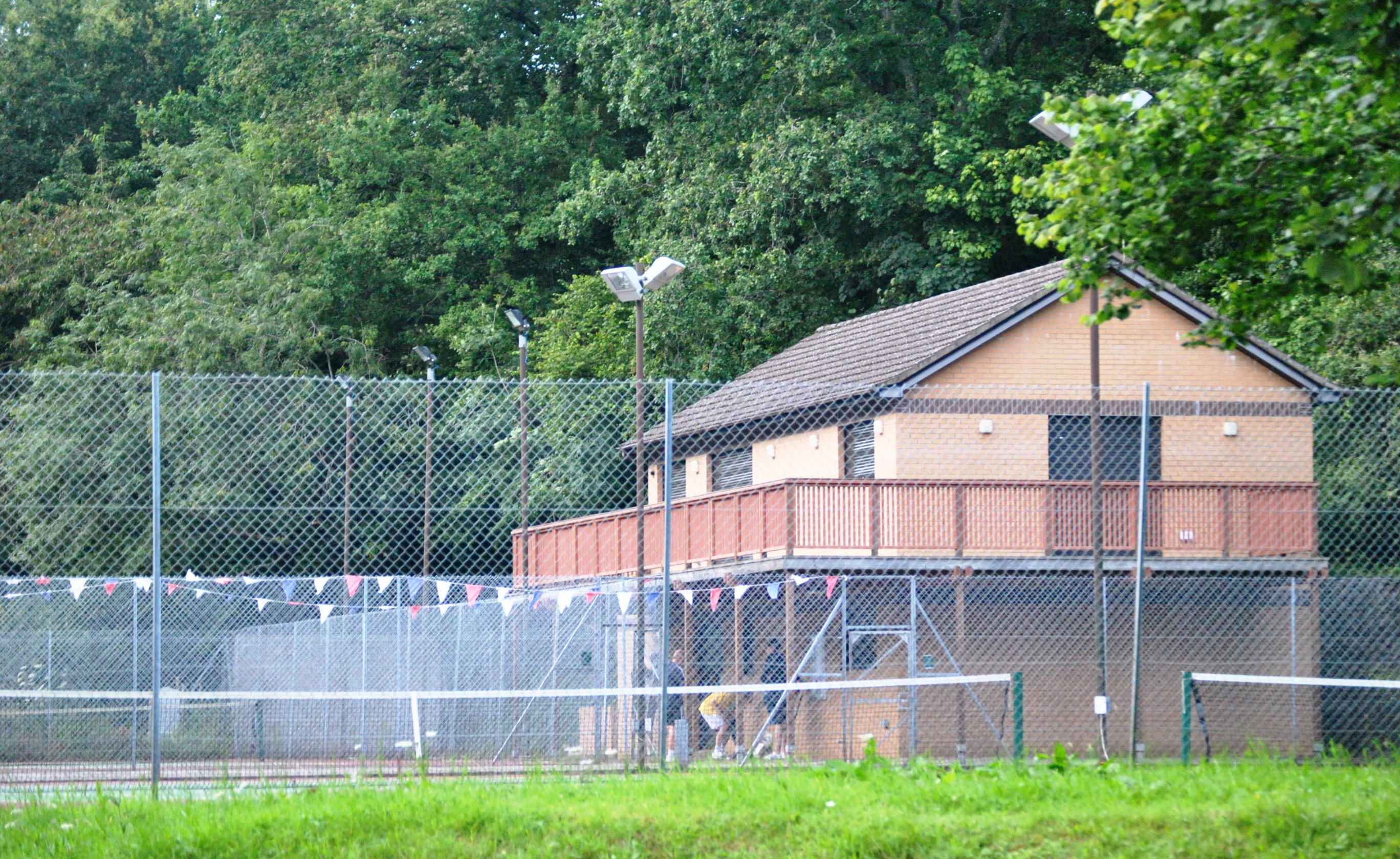
The Tennis Section
(Lisvane (CAC) Tennis Club)
play in the Cardiff suburb of Lisvane

== Cardiff Arms Park Male Choir ==
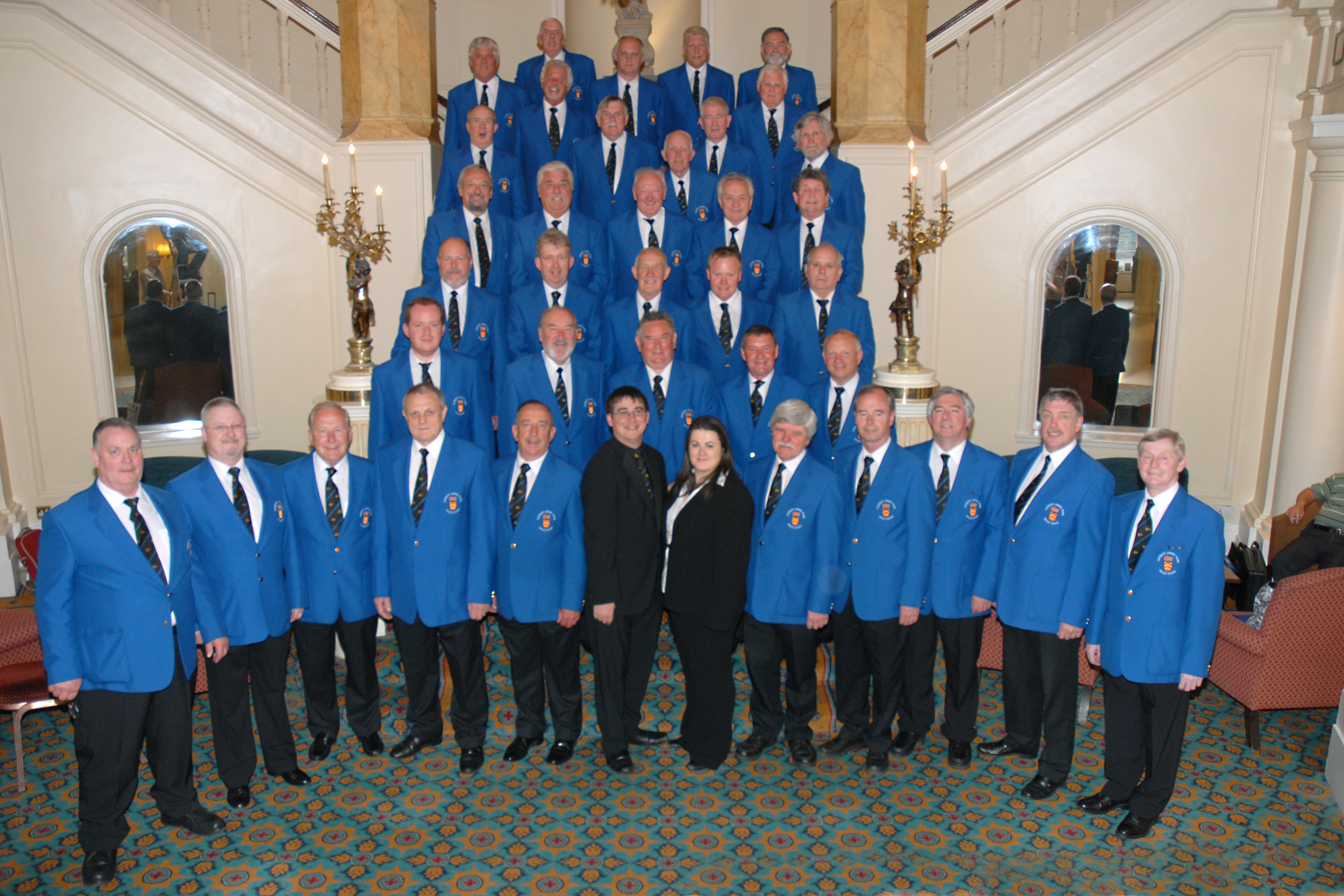
The Cardiff Arms Park Male Choir in 2008

The Arms Park has its own choir, called the Cardiff Arms Park Male Choir. It was formed in 1966 as the Cardiff Athletic Club Male Voice Choir, and today performs internationally with a schedule of concerts and tours. In 2000, the choir changed their name to become the Cardiff Arms Park Male Choir (Welsh: Côr Meibion Parc Yr Arfau Caerdydd).

== See also ==
- Sport in Cardiff
- List of sport venues in Cardiff
- History of Cardiff
