= Julian Hodge =

British banker (1904–2004)

Sir Julian Stephen Alfred Hodge (15 October 1904 – 17 July 2004) was a London-born entrepreneur and banker who lived in Wales for most of his life, from the age of five.

== Background and beginnings ==
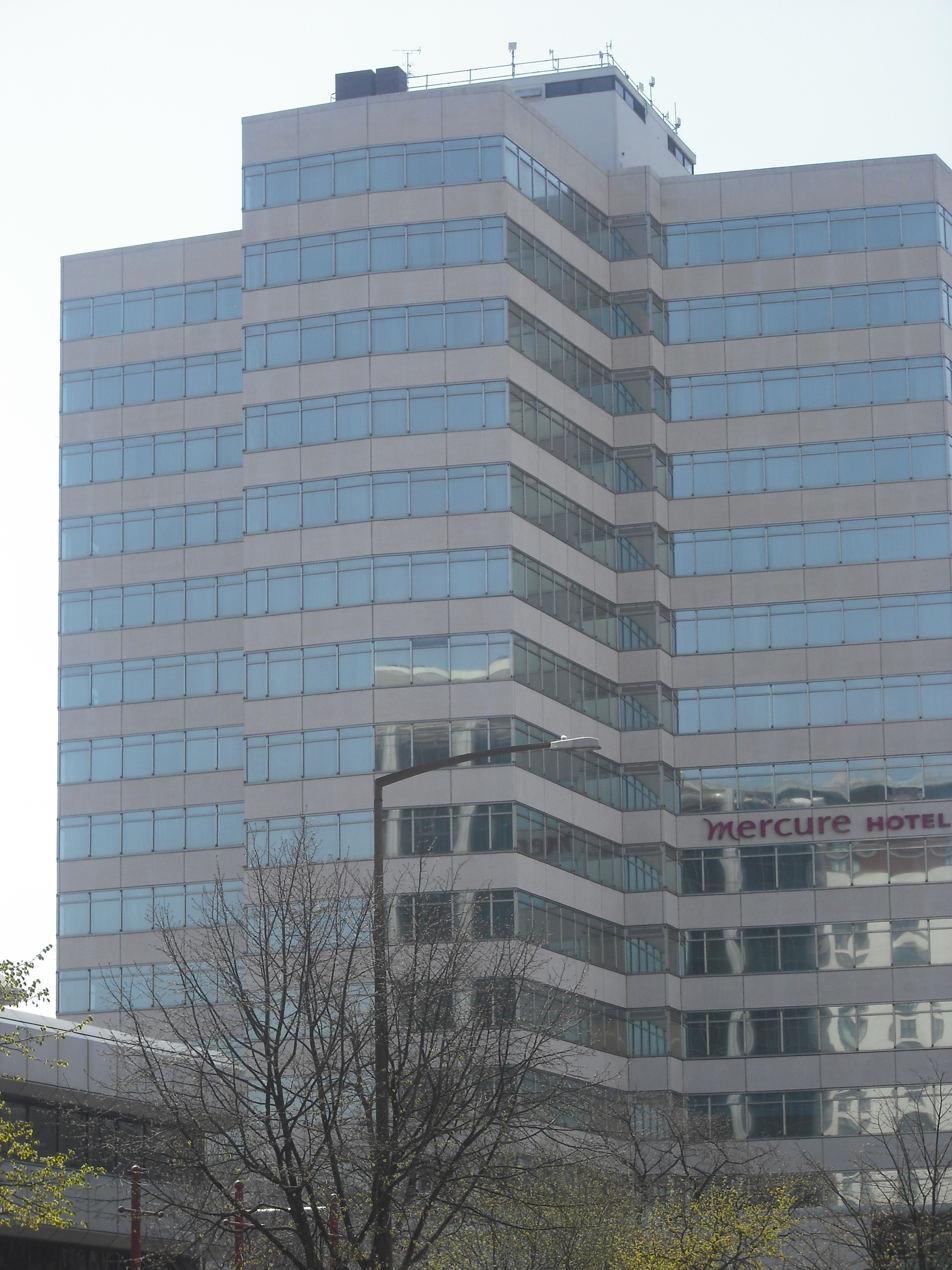
Holland House in Cardiff, built by Hodge in 1968 as Julian Hodge House

Julian Hodge was born on 15 October 1904 in Camberwell, south London, the son of an electrician. His mother was Irish. At the age of four he moved with his family to Pontllanfraith in the South Wales Valleys.

He left school from the Lewis School Pengam at age 13 but his mother encouraged him to read classic novels and recite poetry to further his education. His first job was as an assistant in a chemist's shop. He joined the Great Western Railway as a junior clerk in 1920 and studied accountancy in his spare time, qualifying as a corporate accountant in 1930. He went into business for himself as an accountant in 1934. He married Moira Thomas in 1951 and had three children.

Hodge formed the idea of creating a national bank for Wales. His business was initially based on insurance and money lending and he floated his company as the Hodge Group in 1961. In 1972 he formed the Bank of Wales (originally known as the Commercial Bank of Wales), and later the Julian Hodge Bank, in Cardiff. Hodge bought Ty Gwyn, a prominent house in the village of Lisvane, in the suburbs of Cardiff, in 1961.

He also founded the Jane Hodge foundation, named after his mother, to give money to charitable causes, often offering a 'double your money' challenge where he would match the amounts raised by the public.

In later life from his home as a tax exile in Jersey, Hodge helped fund the campaign for a "No" vote in the 1997 Welsh devolution referendum and his son, Robert Hodge, was chairman of the "Just Say No" campaign.

In 2004 the Sunday Times Rich List estimated his fortune at £48 Million, making him the 18th richest person in Wales, and the oldest of Britain's 1,000 richest people.

He died at his home on Jersey, three months short of his 100th birthday. A donation in his will funded the construction of the Sir Julian Hodge Memorial Organ at St Peter's Roman Catholic Church, Roath, Cardiff.
