= Bank of Wales =

Trading name for Bank of Scotland plc

- Native name: Banc Cymru (Welsh)
- Type: Private
- Industry: Finance
- Founded: 1971
- Products: Financial services
- Parent: Lloyds Banking Group
- Website: www.bankofwales.co.uk

The Bank of Wales (Welsh: Banc Cymru) was a commercial bank in Wales which was founded in 1971. The bank was taken over by the Bank of Scotland plc in 1986 and ceased trading under the Welsh brand in 2002. It is now a trading name used by Bank of Scotland plc, a subsidiary of Lloyds Banking Group.

== History ==
The Bank of Wales was founded by Sir Julian Hodge in 1971. The company provided commercial banking services to small and medium-sized businesses in Wales.

From the outset Sir Julian Hodge wanted the company to be called the Bank of Wales, but the compromise title Commercial Bank of Wales (Welsh: Banc Masnachol Cymru) was adopted following objections from the Registrar of Companies and the Bank of England, which claimed that the proposed name would imply a central bank. The company was eventually officially renamed Bank of Wales in December 1986. By 2000 it had seven regional offices and assets of over £460 million.

The Bank started its life on St Mary Street, but in 1989 moved to Kingsway in a brand-new landmark building opposite Cardiff Castle that later became the headquarters of the Welsh Development Agency.

The bank was taken over by the Bank of Scotland in 1986 and ceased trading under the Welsh brand in 2002. In 2009 Geraint Talfan Davies, Chairman of the Institute of Welsh Affairs, said that the 2008 financial crisis showed the need for the revival of the brand.

In 2014 Lloyds Banking Group announced that it would re-establish the Bank of Wales as a savings provider. Its savings products were only available through a selected panel of life assurance companies. As of June 2021, these products are no longer available.

== See also ==
- Julian Hodge Bank
- Sir Alun Talfan Davies – former Chairman
- Viscount Tonypandy – Chairman 1985–1991
- James Callaghan – former prime minister of the United Kingdom and non-executive director of the Bank.
