= Lisvane (CAC) Tennis Club =

Welsh tennis club in Cardiff

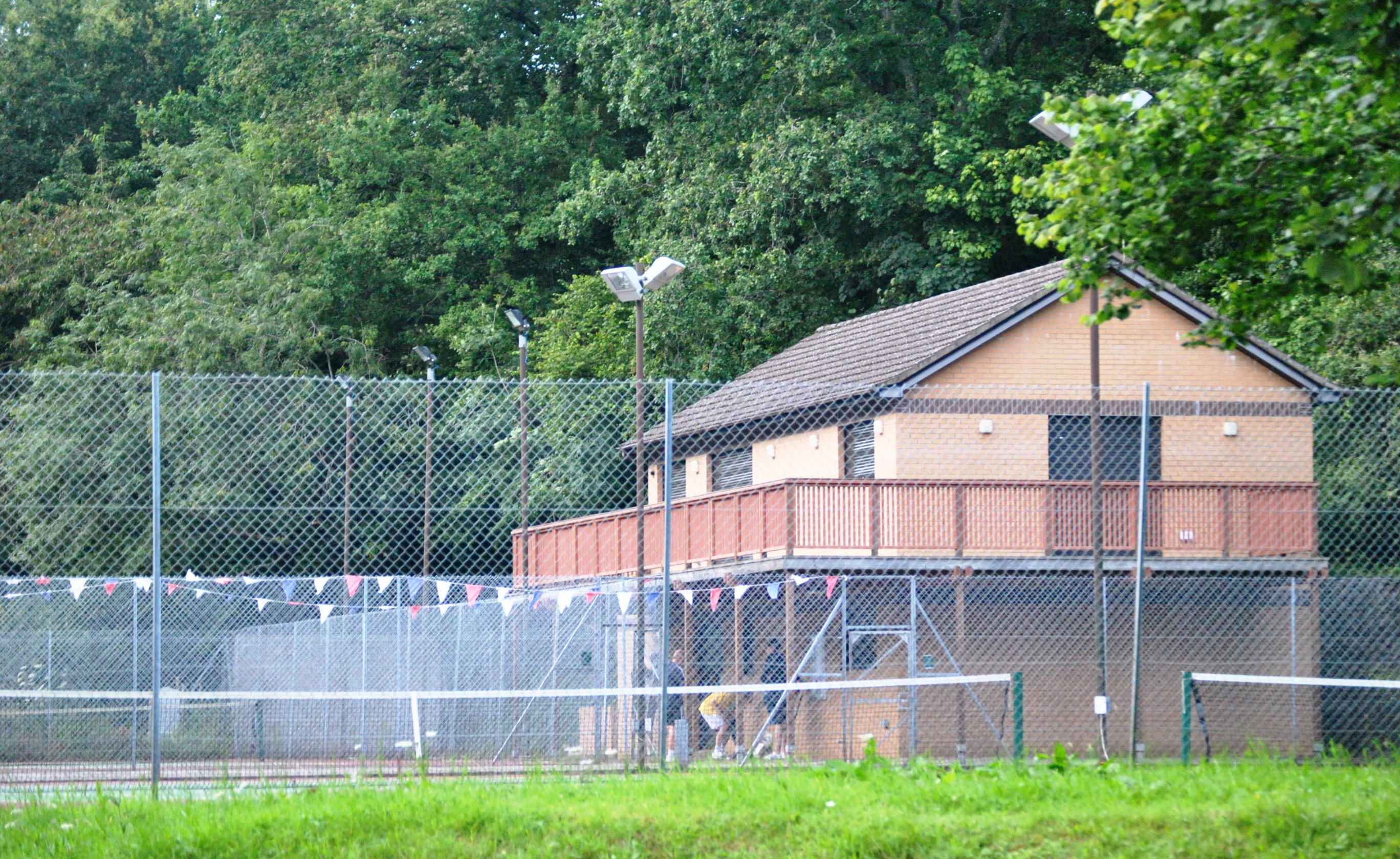
- Clubhouse and courts
- Interactive map of Lisvane (CAC) Tennis Club
- Former names: Lisvane Tennis Club and Cardiff Tennis Club before merger
- Location: Lisvane, Cardiff, Wales
- Coordinates: 51.54811°N 3.18491°W
- Owner: Cardiff Athletic Club
- Surface: all-weather

Construction
- Opened: 1988

Lisvane (CAC) Tennis Club, also known as either the Cardiff Tennis Club, or the Lisvane Tennis Club, is a tennis club based in Lisvane, Cardiff, Wales. Lisvane Tennis Club amalgamated with the tennis section of Cardiff Athletic Club in 2003 to form the Lisvane (CAC) Tennis Club. It has its headquarters at Cardiff Arms Park.

== History ==
Tennis was first played on Cardiff Arms Park in 1867. The tennis and bowls sections joined with the existing rugby and cricket sections of CAC in the mid-twenties. Ladies Hockey, Baseball and Golf sections joined the CAC in the thirties and Cardiff Hockey Club joined the CAC after World War II. The Tennis section along with the cricket section moved to Sophia Gardens in 1966, and after the Sophia Gardens ground was sold to Glamorgan County Cricket Club in 1998. The tennis section then had no fixed site until in 2003 they amalgamated with Lisvane Tennis Club and moved to a new permanent location in 2003 and became Lisvane (CAC) Tennis Club. Lisvane (CAC) Tennis Club forms the tennis section of Cardiff Athletic Club.

== Facilities ==
In April 2004, Lisvane (CAC) Tennis Club built of a new clubhouse, opened by the then Cardiff Athletic Club President, Bleddyn Williams. The club has five floodlit all-weather tennis courts which are up to LTA standards.

== See also ==
- Sport in Cardiff
