= Hodge Bank =

British bank

Julian Hodge Bank Limited
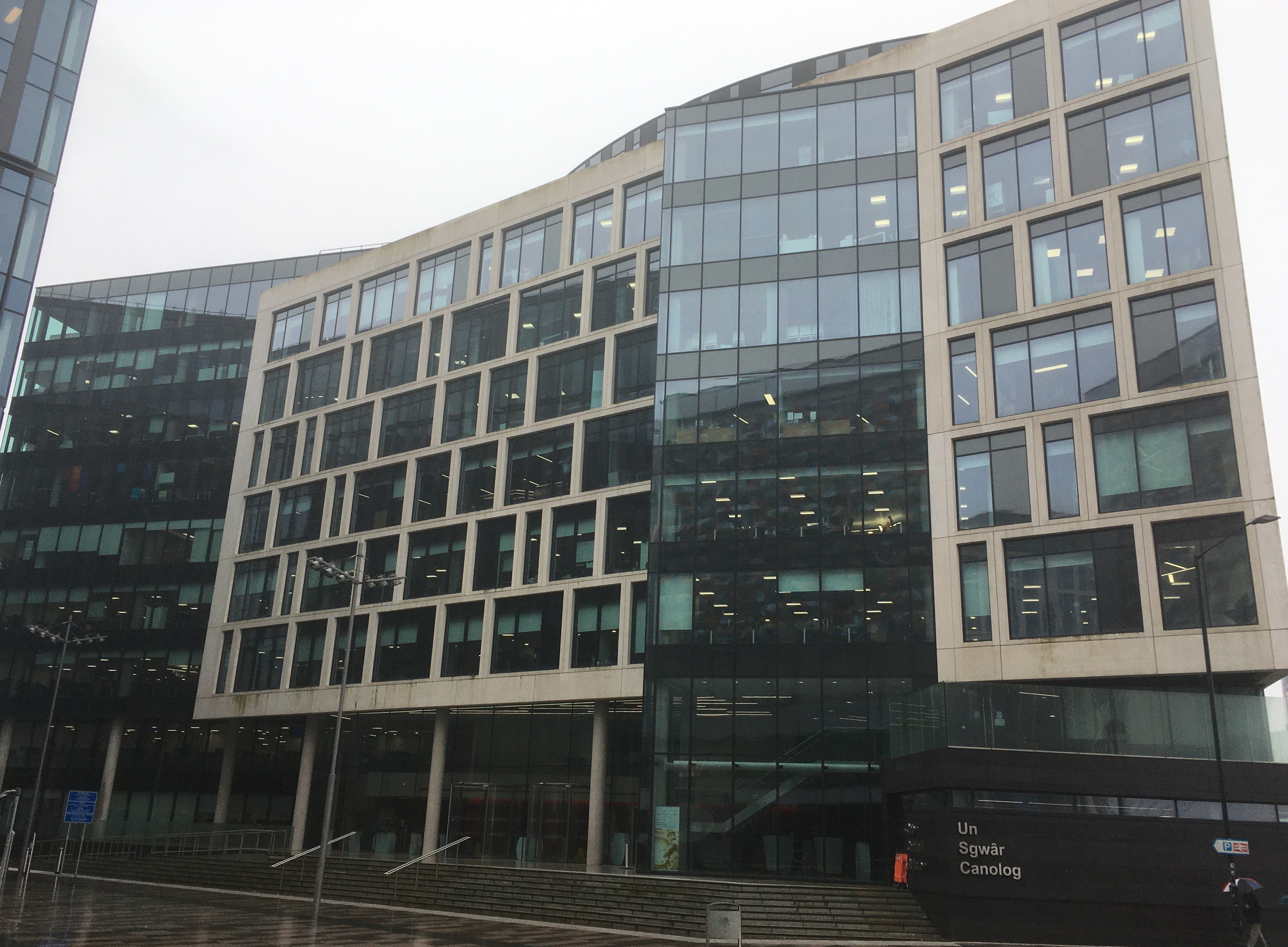
- Headquarters in Cardiff, Wales
- Company type: Private
- Industry: Banking
- Founded: 1987; 39 years ago
- Founder: Sir Julian Hodge
- Headquarters: Cardiff, Wales, United Kingdom
- Parent: The Jane Hodge Foundation (79%)
- Website: hodgebank.co.uk

Julian Hodge Bank Limited, trading as Hodge Bank, is a bank in the United Kingdom. It is named after its founder Sir Julian Hodge. The bank was formed in 1987 and is headquartered in Cardiff, Wales.

In 1965, the Hodge Life Assurance Company was formed preceding the bank, but became a subsidiary company rebranded as Hodge Lifetime. In 2021, Hodge sold this subsidiary to the Reinsurance Group of America, and so exited the annuity and equity release business. However the bank is considering re-entering the equity release market, where it had been the longest established lender in the UK.
