= Sophia Gardens (cricket ground) =

Cricket stadium in Cardiff, Wales

- Cardiff Wales Stadium

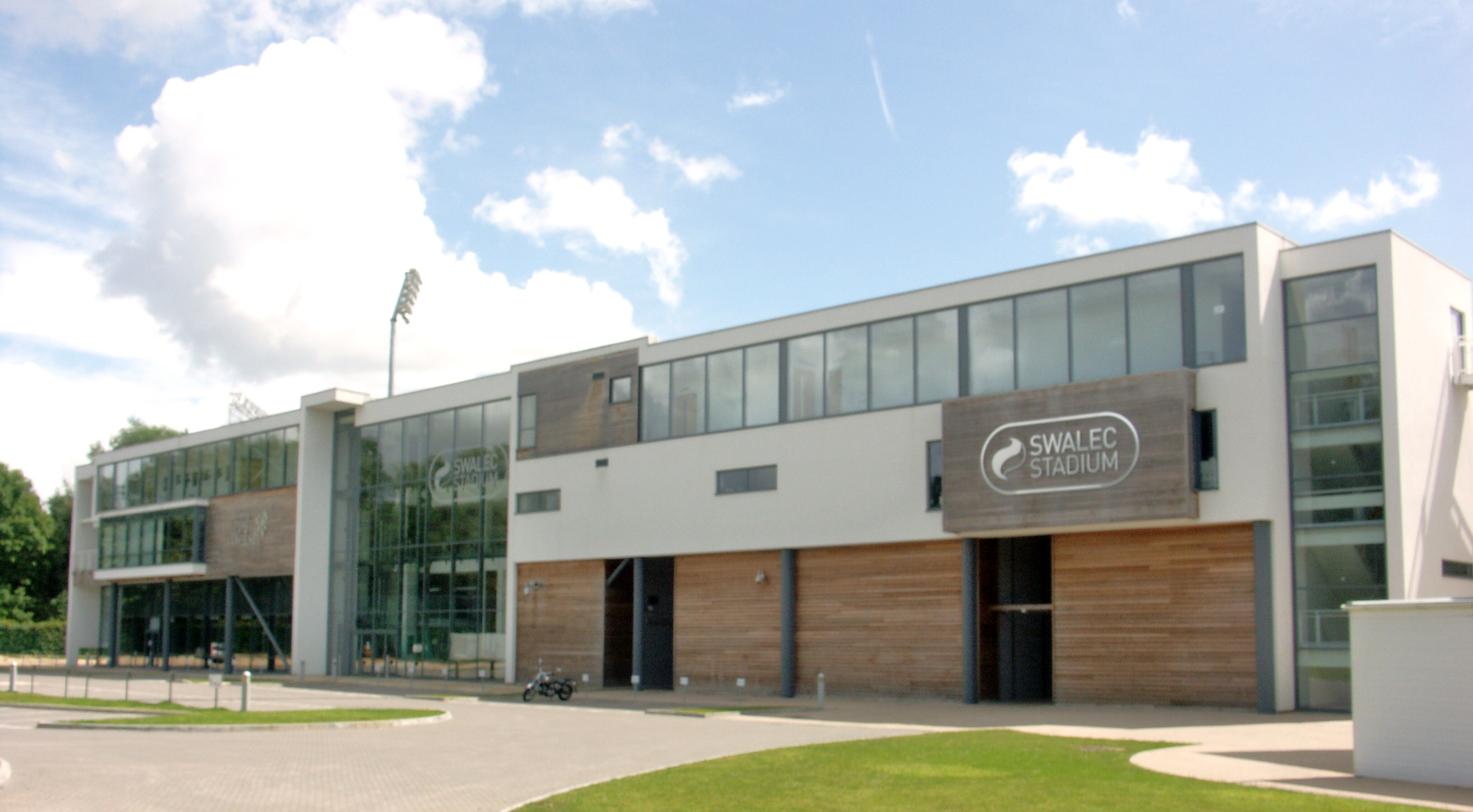
- Thatchers Pavilion
- Interactive map of Sophia Gardens

Ground information
- Location: Cardiff, Wales
- Country: Wales
- Coordinates: 51°29′14″N 3°11′29″W
- Capacity: 15,643
- Owner: Cardiff City Council
- Architect: HLN Architects
- Website: https://glamorgancricket.com/sophia-gardens
- End names
- River Taff End Cathedral Road End

International information
- First men's Test: 8–12 July 2009: England v Australia
- Last men's Test: 8–11 July 2015: England v Australia
- First men's ODI: 20 May 1999: Australia v New Zealand
- Last men's ODI: 16 July 2026: England v India
- First men's T20I: 5 September 2010: England v Pakistan
- Last men's T20I: 17 September 2026: England v Sri Lanka
- First women's ODI: 17 August 2003: England v South Africa
- Last women's ODI: 16 May 2026: England v New Zealand
- Only women's T20I: 31 August 2015: England v Australia

Team information
Glamorgan	(1967–present)
Welsh Fire	(2019–present)
- As of 13 September 2026; Source: ESPNcricinfo

The Cardiff Wales Stadium, which is part of Sophia Gardens Cardiff (/səˈfaɪə/ suh-FY-uh; Welsh: Gerddi Soffia Caerdydd), is a cricket stadium in Cardiff, Wales. It is located in Sophia Gardens on the River Taff. It is home to Glamorgan County Cricket Club and is listed as an international Test cricket venue.

== County cricket ==
The Cathedral Road End

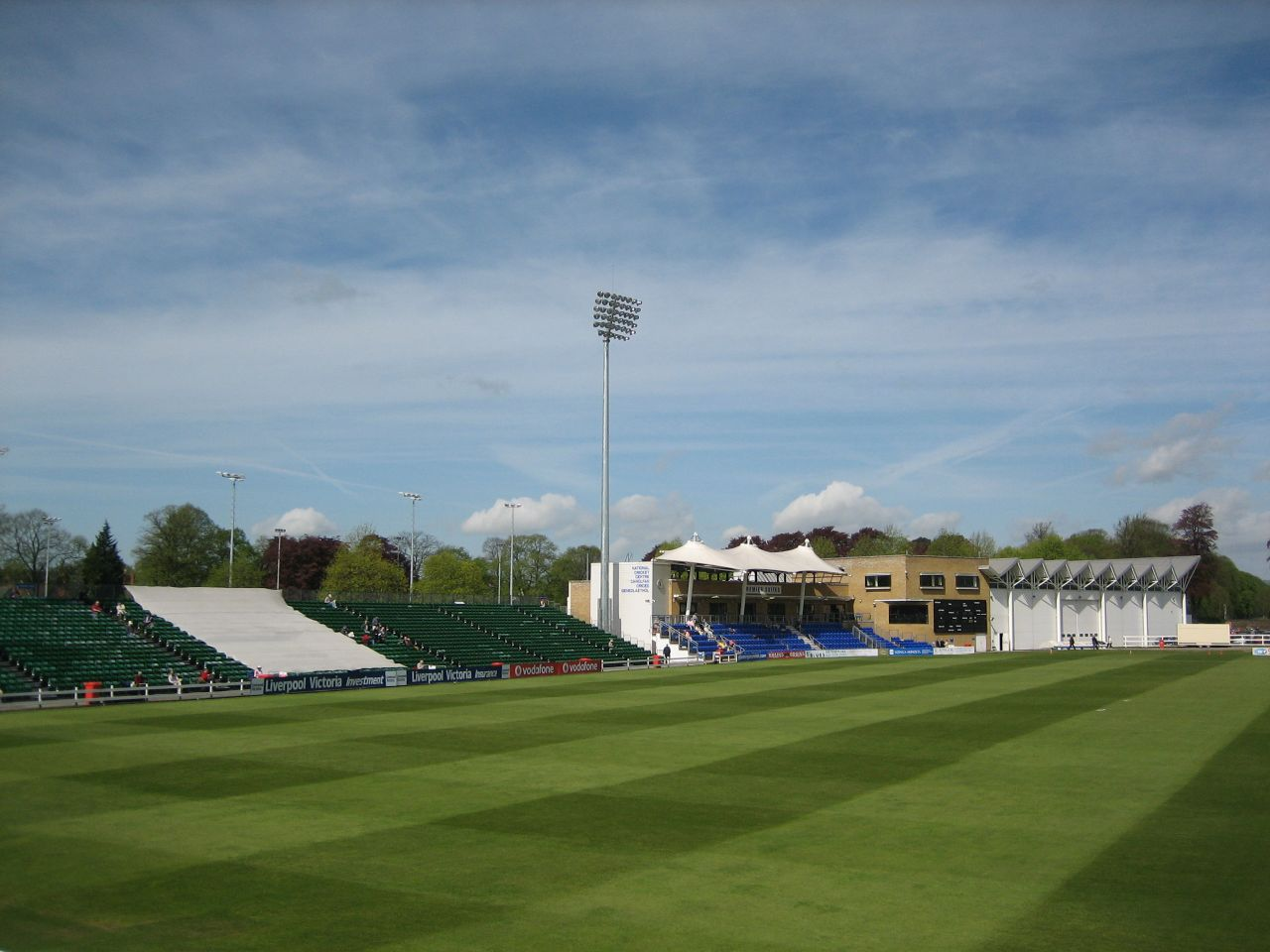
Before the redevelopment
(The Cathedral Road Stand)

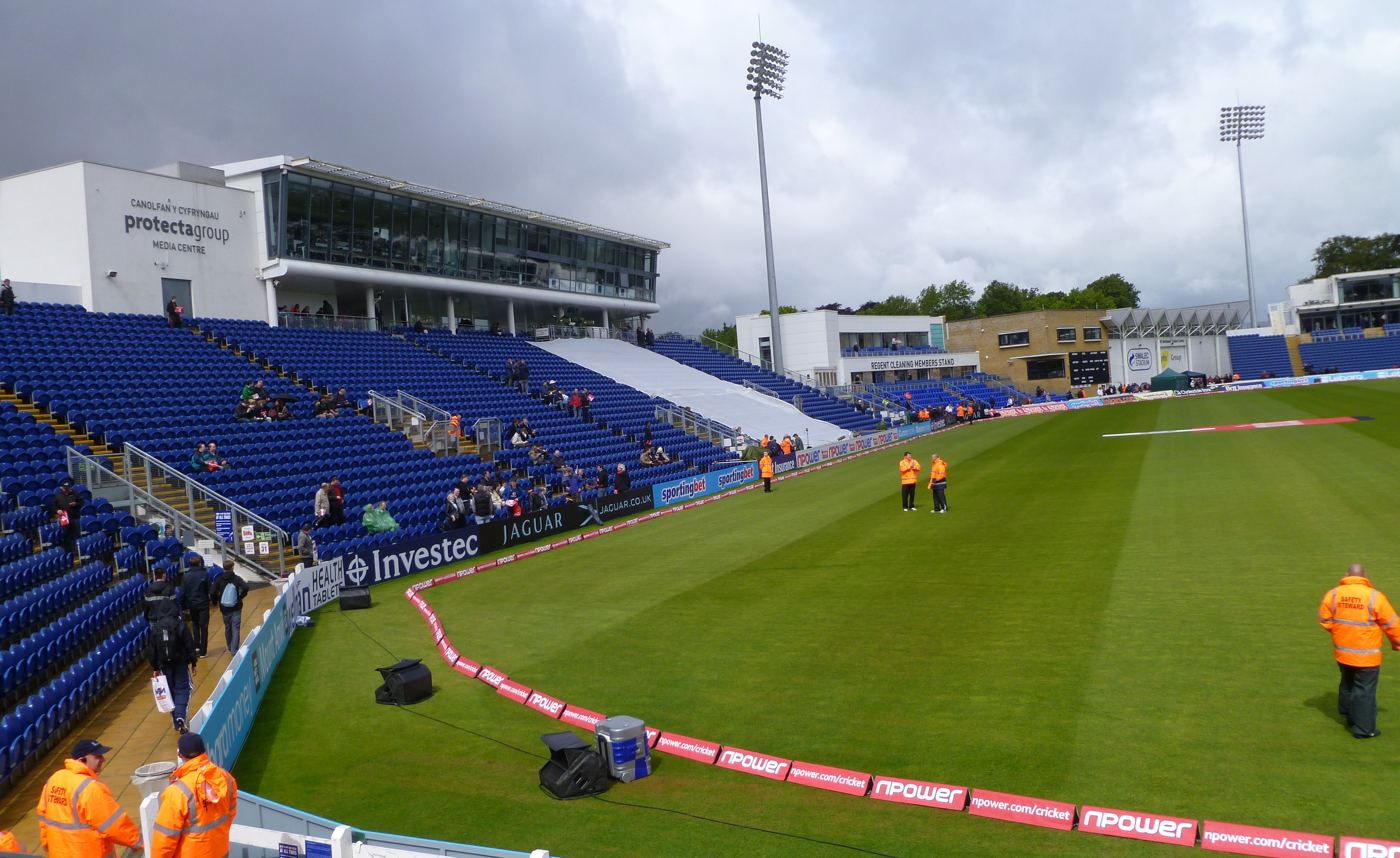
After the redevelopment
(renamed the Castell Howell Stand)

The venue is home to Glamorgan County Cricket Club, which has played its home matches there since 24 May 1967, after moving away from Cardiff Arms Park. A 125-year lease of the ground was acquired in 1995, with the previous leaseholder, Cardiff Athletic Club, moving its cricket section (Cardiff Cricket Club) to the Diamond Ground in Whitchurch. Beside the cricket ground is the large sports hall complex of the Sport Wales National Centre. Cardiff Corinthians F.C. have previously used the area for football.

== International cricket ==
Sophia Gardens has been an international cricket venue since 20 May 1999, when it played host to the 1999 Cricket World Cup match between Australia and New Zealand. From 2001 to 2012, the ground was a regular venue for One Day Internationals, hosting nine matches in 12 years, but it was not until 2006 that it hosted its first England match, the first match of the series against Pakistan on 30 August 2006. In 2012, the ground was named as one of three venues for the 2013 ICC Champions Trophy, along with The Oval and Edgbaston; it hosted five matches, including the opener between India and South Africa on 6 June 2013, and the semi-final between India and Sri Lanka on 20 June. The ground also hosted two Twenty20 Internationals between England and Pakistan in September 2010, and hosted another against Australia in August 2015.

On 11 April 2008, the England and Wales Cricket Board (ECB) announced that the venue would host a series of major Test matches over the next four years. It would host its first Test match on 8 July 2009 as the opening match of an Ashes series between England and Australia. This made Sophia Gardens the 100th Test match venue. In July 2011, the ECB stripped the ground of its right to host the 2012 West Indies Test because of Glamorgan's late payment of the £2.5 million fee it owed for hosting the 2011 Sri Lanka Test. The ground was originally set to host a Test match against New Zealand in 2013, but this was given up in exchange for the 2013 Champions Trophy. The ground was chosen as the venue for the first Test of the 2015 Ashes series.

The ground was one of 11 venues for the 2019 Cricket World Cup. It was host for four group matches.

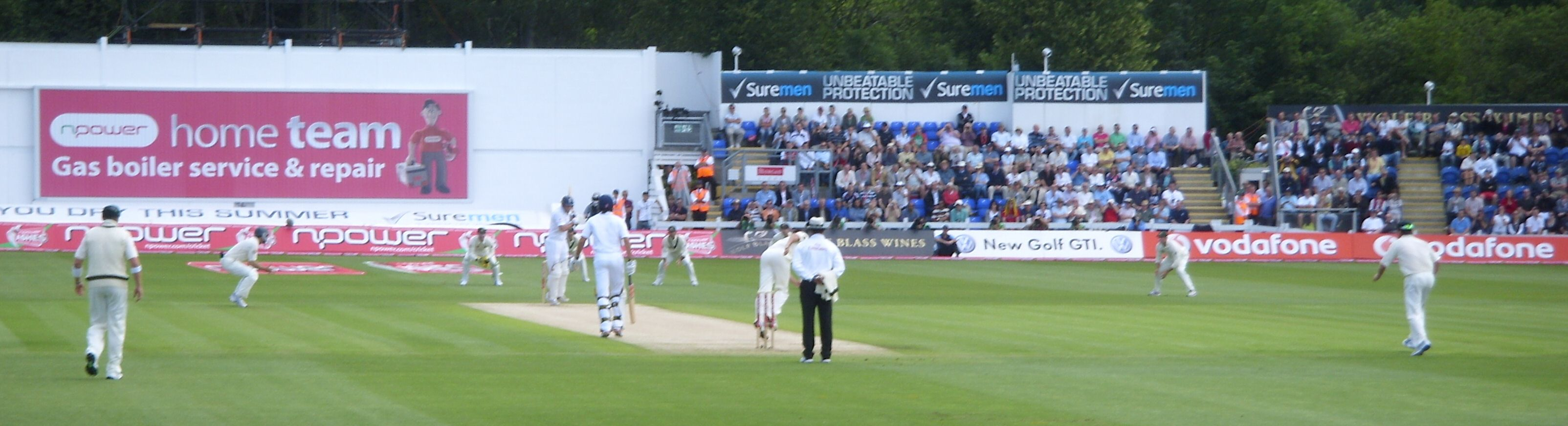
The opening ball of the 2009 Ashes series, bowled by Mitchell Johnson to Andrew Strauss. In the background is the Riverside Stand.

== Stadium redevelopment ==
Sophia Gardens after redevelopment

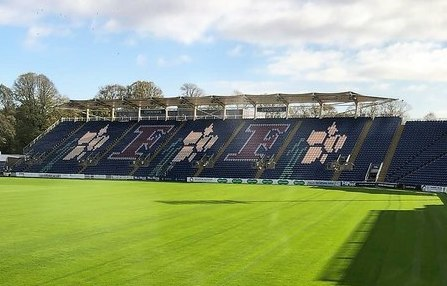
The Foster's Grandstand

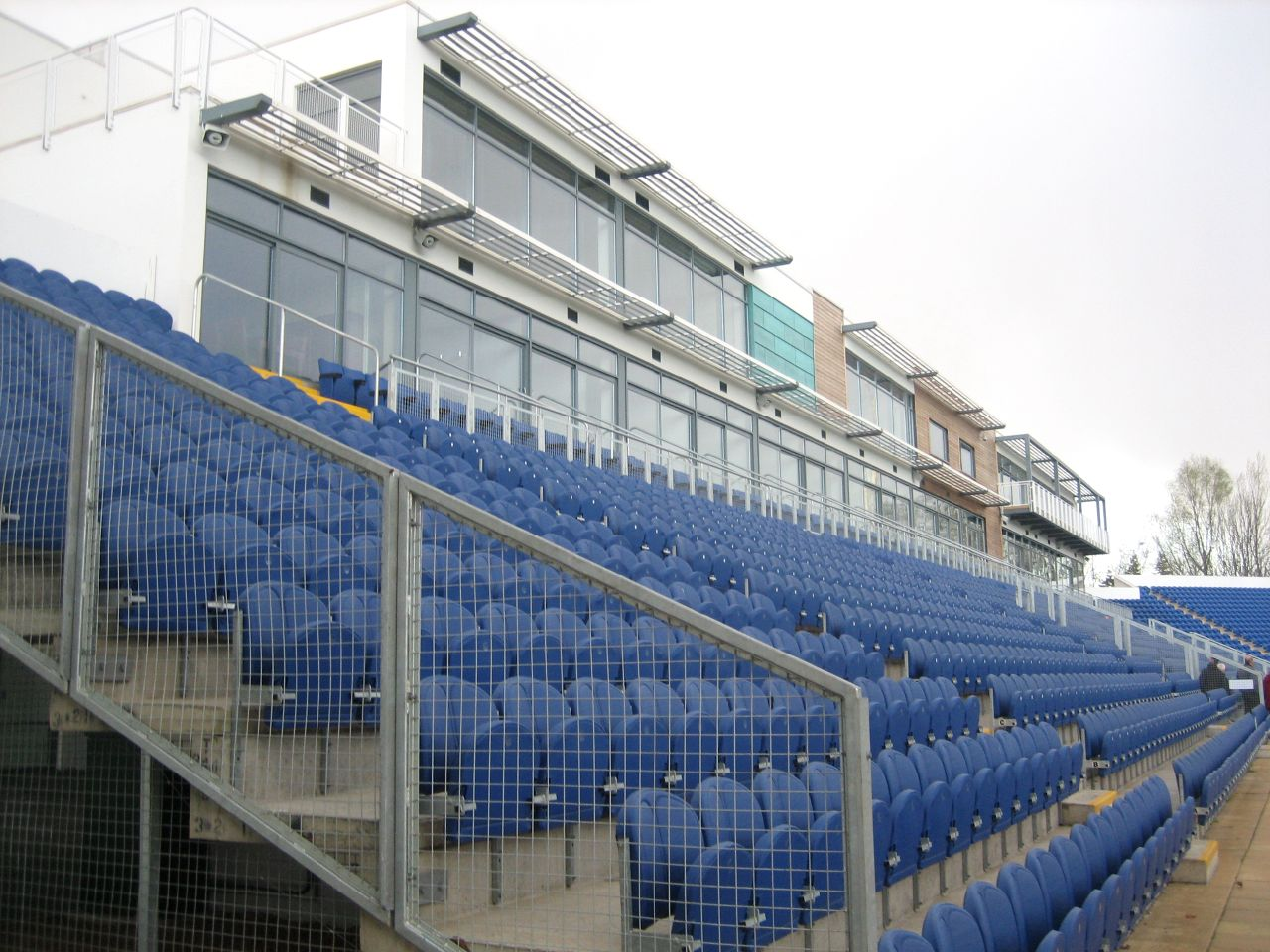
The Discover Leeks Pavilion

The cost of redeveloping the stadium was £9.4 million. About half of this (£4.5 million) being provided as a loan by Cardiff Council. It was predicted at the timee that that the revamped stadium could host seven Test matches, nine One Day Internationals and two World Cup games up to 2028, injecting at least £50 million into the local economy. However, since the redevelopment only Cardiff has only hosted 3 Test Matches, although it has hosted 25 ODIs as of 2026.

Construction work on the redevelopment of Sophia Gardens began in April 2007, and the redeveloped stadium was first opened for competitive matches on 9 May 2008, when the Glamorgan Dragons played the Gloucestershire Gladiators in a Friends Provident Trophy match which the Gladiators won by six wickets.

=== Stadium naming rights ===
The logos used during the SWALEC sponsorship deal

Used from 2008 until 2015, when the stadium was known as the SWALEC Stadium

Used from 2015 until early 2018, when the stadium was known as the SSE SWALEC

On 4 March 2008, Glamorgan Cricket Club announced a 10-year sponsorship deal with SWALEC, thought to be the biggest single sponsorship by a county cricket club, giving SWALEC the naming rights to the new stadium, worth in excess of £1.5 million over 10 years.

In June 2015, ahead of the First Test of the 2015 Ashes series, the stadium was renamed as simply "The SSE SWALEC" in reflection of the ownership of sponsors SWALEC by SSE plc. The new logo from June 2015 was designed to reflect the shape of the stadium. In April 2018 the stadium officially reverted to its original name of Sophia Gardens following the end of the sponsorship deal.

== See also ==
- Sport in Cardiff
- List of cricket grounds in England and Wales
- Cricket Wales
