= Cardiff Cricket Club =

Welsh cricket club

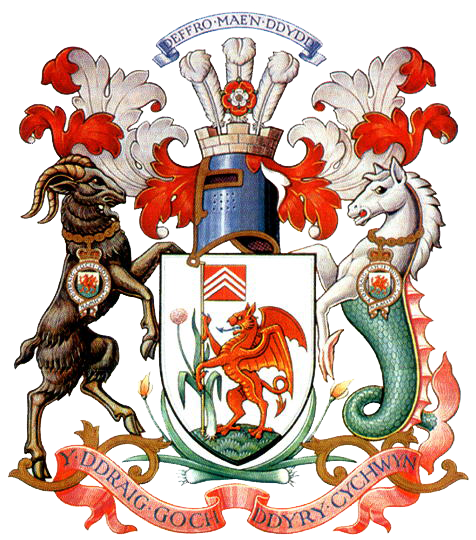
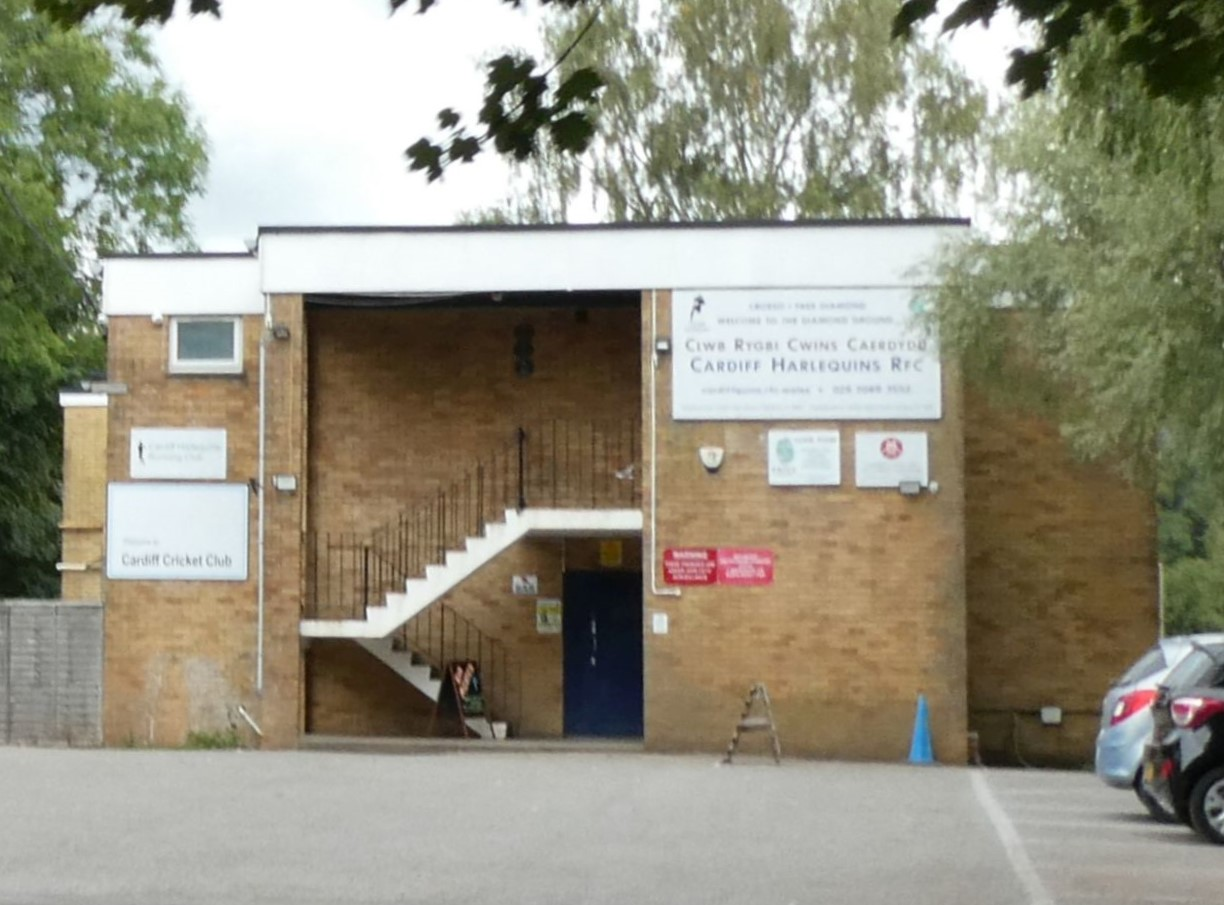
- Cardiff Cricket Clubhouse

Team information
- Founded: 1819; 207 years ago
- Home ground: 1867–1966: Cardiff Arms Park; 1967–1997: Sophia Gardens; 1997 to date: Diamond Ground
- Official website: cardiff.play-cricket.com

Cardiff Cricket Club is a cricket club based in Whitchurch, Cardiff, Wales. It was established in 1819 and forms the cricket section of Cardiff Athletic Club with its headquarters at Cardiff Arms Park. The first team plays in the South Wales Premier Cricket League. It is one of the oldest sporting organisations in the whole of Wales.

== History ==
Cardiff Cricket Club was established in 1819. The club initially played on various cricket grounds, mostly in eastern Cardiff, due to better drainage. The club then moved to Cardiff Arms Park, but it was more of a gentlemen's club, rather than a sports club. By 1867 the Bute Estate agreed that the cricket club could rent the eastern part of the Arms Park at only one shilling per annum. By April 1875 the Bute Estate decided to restrict access to the Arms Park to Cardiff Cricket Club and other recognised clubs.

In 1922 Cardiff Football Club, later renamed Cardiff Rugby Football Club and Cardiff Cricket Club amalgamated to form the Cardiff Athletic Club. There had been previous attempts to merge the clubs, in November 1892 and between 1902 and 1904, when the two clubs worked closely to fund a new pavilion to serve the needs of both clubs, but it was not until 1922 that the merger finally took place. Later the Cardiff Arms Park Company Limited was formed by Cardiff Athletic Club, Arms Park (Cardiff) Greyhound Racing Company Limited and the Welsh Rugby Union (WRU) acquired the land from the Bute Estate for £30,000 (GBP), but on the understanding that the Arms Park was only used for recreational purposes and was not sold for building. The cricket section of the Athletic Club acquired a 99 lease from the company at a rental of £200 per annum, with Glamorgan County Cricket Club paying rent for the use of the park for county cricket.

The existing wooden cricket and rugby pavilion had been demolished and new changing rooms included in the new North Stand. In 1937 a new cricket pavilion was built for the cricket section of Cardiff Athletic Club. By the mid 1950s improvements meant that the capacity of the cricket ground had increased to around 15,000, although the ground was still very small and often visiting teams agreed to the boundaries being shortened so that people could sit on the grass. Cardiff Athletic Club however wanted to develop new facilities for both the bowls and tennis sections, and did not allow new seating to be erected just for county games. A new scheme was developed to change the existing rugby ground into the National Stadium, and creating a smaller ground for Cardiff R.F.C. on the existing cricket ground, with the cricket section of Cardiff Athletic Club moving to Sophia Gardens. Cardiff Cricket Club played their final game at Cardiff Arms Park against Lydney Cricket Club on 17 September 1966.

In 1998, Cardiff Athletic Club sold the Sophia Gardens ground to Glamorgan County Cricket Club and the cricket section of Cardiff Athletic Club (Cardiff Cricket Club) for many years had no fixed cricket ground, while they were looking for a suitable cricket ground. In 1997 the club moved to their permanent home of the Diamond cricket ground at Forest Farm, Whitchurch, Cardiff and by July 2007 a new pavilion had been built on the ground.

Cardiff Cricket Club have won the South Wales Premier Cricket League in both 2009 and 2011.

== See also ==
- Sport in Cardiff
