= List of places of worship in Cardiff =

This is a list of places of worship in Cardiff, capital city of Wales.

== Currently active ==
=== Buddhist ===
- Cardiff Buddhist Centre, Roath
- Kagyu Samye Dzong, Canton

=== Christian ===
==== Baptist Union of Great Britain ====
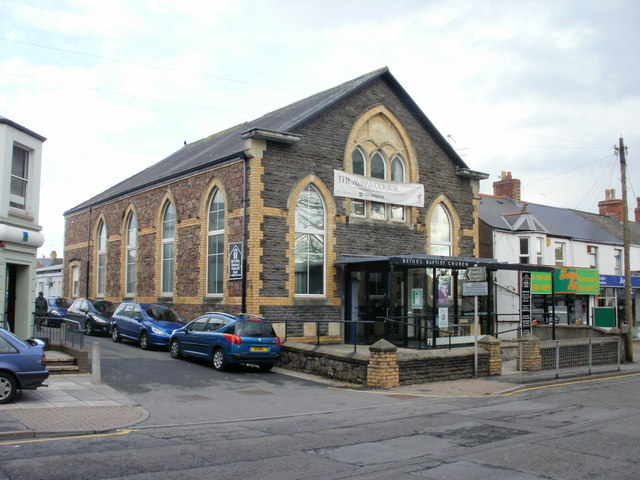
Bethel, Whitchurch

- Albany Road Baptist Church, Roath Park
- Alfred Tilly Memorial Baptist Church (Rumney Baptist Church), Rumney
- Ararat, Whitchurch
- Belmont, Tremorfa
- Bethany, Rhiwbina
- Bethel, Whitchurch
- Calvary, Canton
- Christchurch United Church, Llanedeyrn
- Cornwall Street Baptist Church, Grangetown
- Ely (Archer Rd) Baptist, The Church on the Roundabout, Ely
- Grangetown Baptish Church, Grangetown
- Llanishen Baptist Church, Llanishen
- Lisvane Baptist Church, Lisvane
- Pentyrch Street, Cathays
- Siloam, Llanrumney
- Splott Baptist Church, Splott
- Tredegarville Baptist Church, Roath, also used by Life Church Cardiff
- Woodville Baptist Church, Cathays

==== Baptist Union of Wales ====
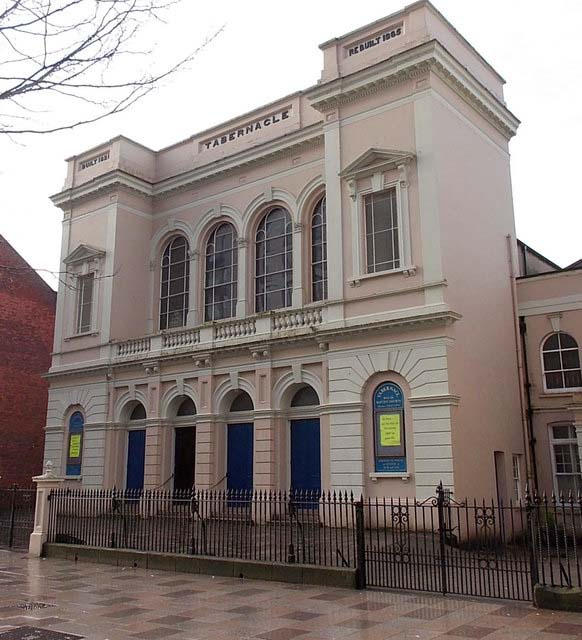
Tabernacl Chapel

- Tabernacl, city centre

==== Church of Jesus Christ of Latter-day Saints ====
- Church of Jesus Christ of Latter-day Saints, Rhiwbina

==== Church in Wales ====
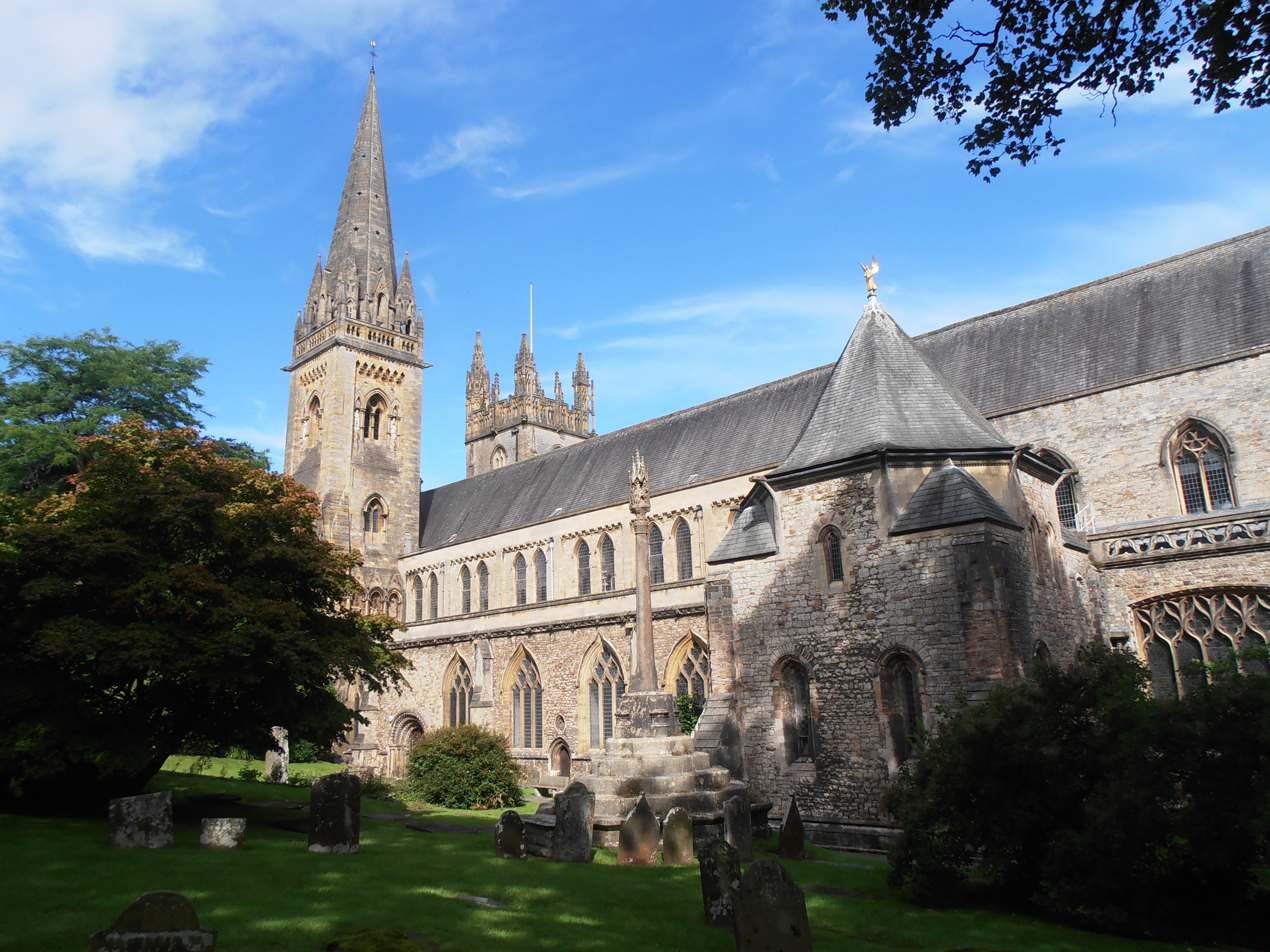
Llandaff Cathedral

- Llandaff Cathedral, Llandaff
- All Saints', Llandaff North
- All Saints', Rhiwbina
- Christ Church, Roath Park
- Christ Church, Radyr
- St Andrew and St Teilo, Cathays, operating as Citizen Church
- St Augustine's, Rumney
- St Catherine's, Canton
- St David's, Caerau
- St Denys', Lisvane
- Dewi Sant, city centre – formerly St Andrew's
- St Dyfrig and St Samson, Grangetown (also used by the Romanian Orthodox Parish of St Stephen)
- St Edward the Confessor, Roath
- St Edeyrn's, Old St Mellons
- St Faith's, Llanishen
- St German's, Adamsdown
- St Isan's, Llanishen
- St John the Baptist, city centre – one of the two churches of medieval Cardiff, with St Mary's.

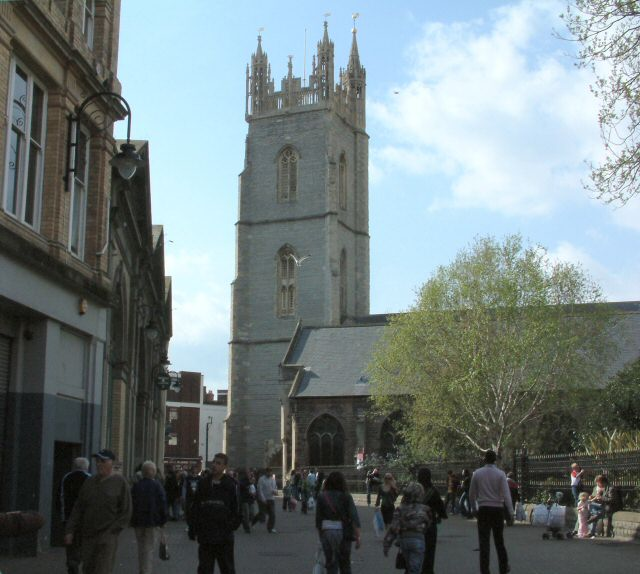
St John the Baptist

- St John the Baptist, Danescourt
- St John the Evangelist, Canton (also used by the Russian Orthodox Church Outside of Russia Parish of the Kazan Icon of The Mother of God)
- St Luke's, Canton
- St Margaret's, Roath
- St Mark's, Gabalfa
- St Martin's Roath
- St Mary's Whitchurch
- St Mary the Virgin, Butetown
- St Michael and All Angels, Cathays
- St Paul's, Grangetown
- St Philip, Tremorfa
- Church of the Resurrection, Ely
- St Saviour's, Splott
- St Thomas's, Birchgrove
- St Timothy's, Caerau

==== Ecumenical churches and shared churches ====
- Canton Uniting Church, Canton (Baptist Union of Great Britain and United Reformed Church)
- Christchurch, Llandaff North (shared by Methodist and United Reformed churches)
- Christchurch, Fairwater (shared by Methodist and United Reformed churches)
- St David's Ecumenical Church, Pentwyn (Baptist Union of Great Britain, Church in Wales and United Reformed Church)
- Llanrumney Community Church, Llanrumney (shared by Rhiwbina Baptist Church and New Hope Community Church)
- Pontprennau Community Church, Pontprennau (Baptist, Church in Wales, Methodist and United Reformed Church)
- The Church of the Resurrection, St Mellons

==== Elim Pentecostal Church ====
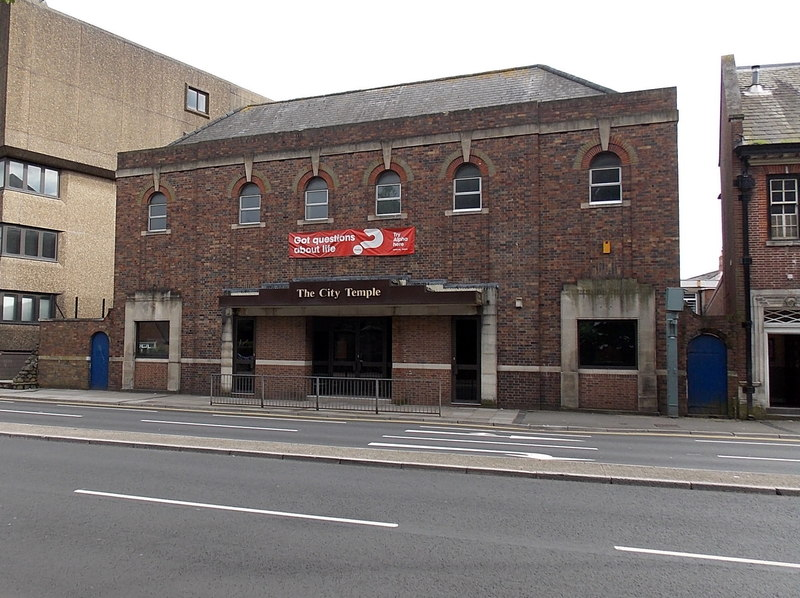
City Temple

- City Church, Riverside
- The Beacon Church, St Mellons

==== Evangelical Lutheran Church of England ====
- St David's, Fairwater

==== Evangelical Presbyterian Church in England and Wales ====
- Bethel, Culverhouse Cross
- Immanuel, Caerau

==== Gospel Halls ====
- Adamsdown Gospel Hall, Adamsdown
- Canton Gospel Hall, Canton
- Ebenezer Gospel Hall, Grangetown
- Fairwater Gospel Hall, Fairwater
- Heath Gospel Hall, Heath
- Leckwith Gospel Hall (The Church in the Avenue), Canton

==== Greek Orthodox Church ====
- St Nicholas's Church, Butetown

==== Independent Baptist ====
- Ainon, Tongwynlais
- Cornwall Street Baptist Church, Grangetown
- Emmanuel, Gabalfa
- Gabalfa Baptist Church, Gabalfa
- St Mellons (Caersalem) Baptist Church, St Mellons
- Rhiwbina Baptist Church, Rhiwbina

==== Jehovah's Witnesses ====
- Kingdom Hall, Gabalfa
- Kingdom Hall, Llanrumney

==== Methodist Church ====
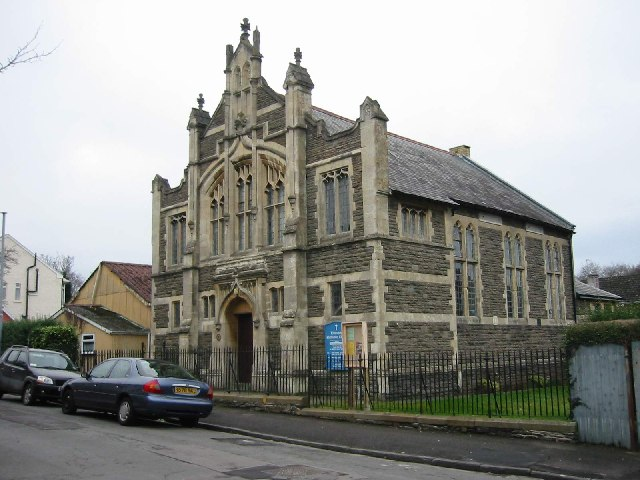
Llanishen Methodist Church

- St Andrew's, Birchgrove (also used by Seventh-day Adventist Church)
- Cathays Methodist Church, Cathays
- Copleston Road Methodist Church, Llandaff North
- Cyncoed Methodist Church, Cyncoed
- Conway Road Pontcanna (also used by German Lutheran Church and the Russian Orthodox parish of St Theodore & St Teilo)
- Ely Methodist, Ely
- Llanishen Methodist Church, Llanishen
- St Paul's, Butetown
- Radyr Methodist, Radyr
- Rumney Methodist Church, Rumney
- Wesley Methodist, Canton
- Whitchurch Methodist, Whitchurch

==== Presbyterian Church of Wales ====
- Cathedral Road, Pontcanna
- Fairwater Church, Fairwater
- Park End, Cyncoed
- Tabernacle, Whitchurch
- Saltmead Hall, Grangetown

==== Quakers ====
- Friends Meeting House, city centre

==== Roman Catholic Church ====
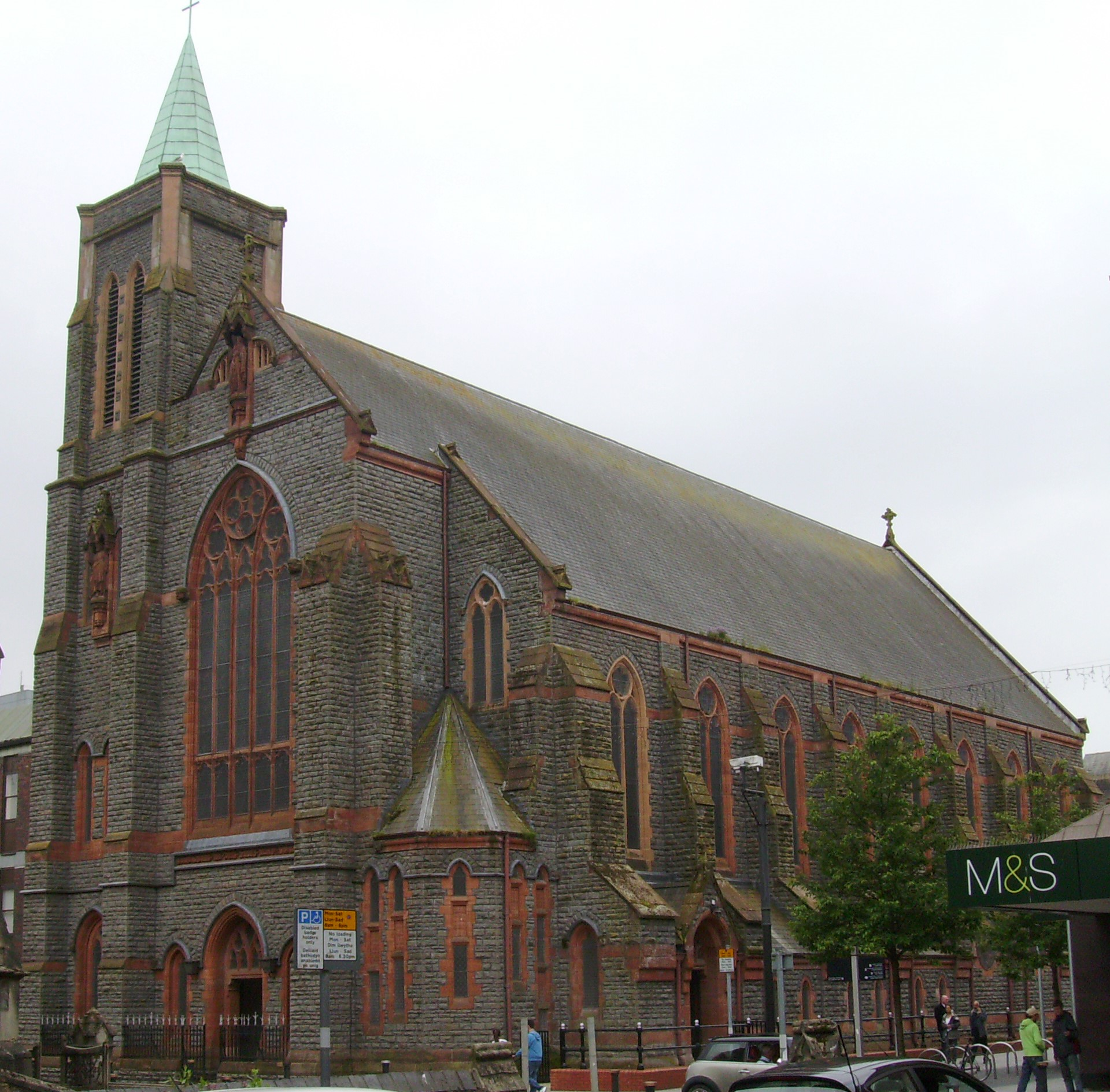
Cardiff Metropolitan Cathedral

- Cardiff Metropolitan Cathedral (St David's Cathedral), city centre
- St Alban-on-the-Moors, Splott
- Blessed Sacrament, Rumney
- St Brigid's, Llanishen
- St Cadoc's Church, Llanrumney
- Christ the King, Llanishen
- St Clare's, Ely
- St Francis of Assisi, Ely
- Holy Family, Fairwater
- St John Lloyd, Rumney
- St Joseph's, Gabalfa
- St Mary of the Angels, Canton
- Our Lady of Lourdes, Llandaff North
- St Patrick's, Grangetown
- St Paul's, Cyncoed
- St Peter's, Plasnewydd
- St Philip Evans, Llanedeyrn
- St Teilo's, Whitchurch
- University Catholic Chaplaincy

==== Salvation Army ====
- The Salvation Army, Canton
- The Salvation Army, Cathays
- The Salvation Army, Ely
- The Salvation Army, Grangetown
- The Salvation Army, Splott

==== Union of Welsh Independents ====
- Eglwys Minny Street, Cathays

==== United Reformed Church ====
- St Andrews, Roath
- Bethel, Llanishen
- Bethesda, Tongwynlais
- Beulah, Rhiwbina
- City United Reformed Church, city centre
- Parkminster United Reformed Church, Roath (also used by Calvary Church of God in Christ)

==== Other denominations and independent churches ====
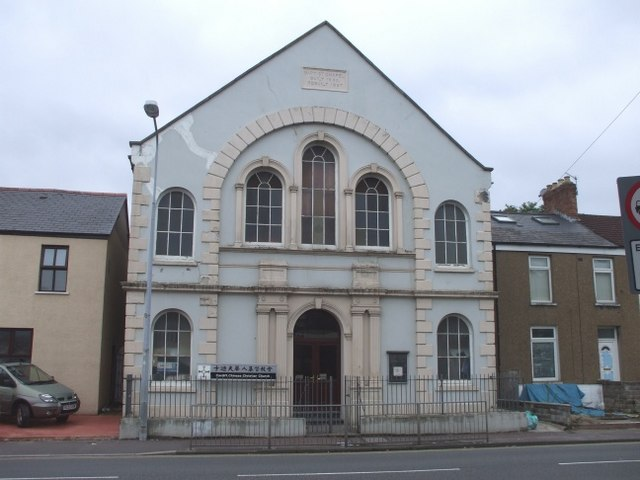
Cardiff Chinese Christian Church

- All Nations Church, Heath
- Bethania, St Mellons
- Bethesda, Rhiwbina
- Cardiff Chinese Christian Church, Canton
- Church of God, Canton
- Ebenezer Church, Grangetown
- Eglwys y Crwys, Cathays
- Eglwys Efengylaidd Gymraeg Caerdydd (Cardiff Welsh Evangelical Church), Cathays
- Freedom Church, Butetown
- Garden of the Lord, Tremorfa
- Glenwood Church, Llanedeyrn
- Heath Evangelical Church, Gabalfa, also holds services of the Cardiff Korean Church.
- Highfields Church, Cathays
- International Church, Cathays
- Llandaff North Christian Centre, Llandaff North (formerly Llandaff North Gospel Hall)
- Llanishen Evangelical Church, Llanishen (formerly Emmaus Chapel)
- Mackintosh Evangelical Church, Roath
- Minster Christian Centre, Roath
- New Hope Centre, Butetown
- New Hope Community Church, Llanrumney
- New Testament Church of God, Butetown
- Rumney Chapel, Rumney
- Salem, Canton
- Shiloh Pentecostal Church, Riverside
- The Redeemed Christian Church of God (RCCG) House of Praise, Cardiff
- Tabernacle, Roath
- Thornhill Church, Thornhill

=== Hindu ===
- India Centre, Splott
- Sanatan Dharma Mandal, city centre
- Shree Swaminarayan Temple, Grangetown

=== Islam ===
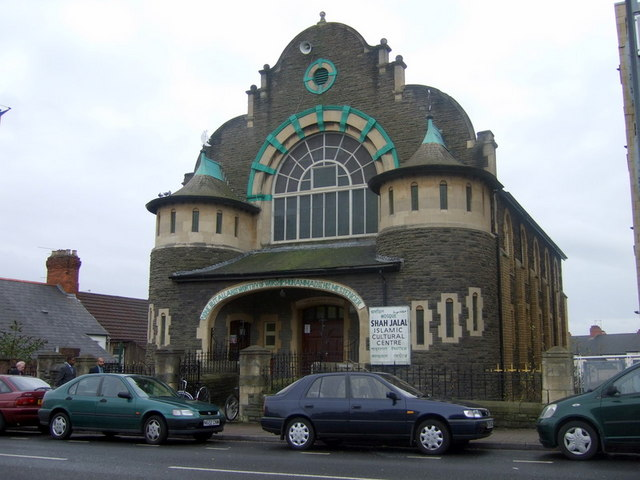
Shah Jalal Islamic Cultural Centre

- Al Falah Centre, Riverside
- Al-Manar Centre, Cathays
- Dar-ul-Isra, Cathays
- Grangetown Muslim Cultural Centre, Grangetown
- Jalalia Mosque & Islamic Education Centre, Riverside
- Jamia Masjid Bilal, Canton
- Madina Mosque, Cathays
- Masjid Noor, Butetown
- Masjid-e-Umar, Roath
- Shah Jalal Mosque & Islamic Cultural Centre, Cathays
- South Wales Islamic Centre, Butetown

=== Judaism ===
==== Movement for Reform ====
- Cardiff Reform Synagogue, Adamsdown

==== Orthodox ====
- Cardiff United Synagogue, Cyncoed

=== Sikhism ===
- Sri Dasmesh Singh Sabha Gurdwara Bhatra, Riverside
- Sikh Gurdwara Temple, Roath

== Notable defunct places of worship ==
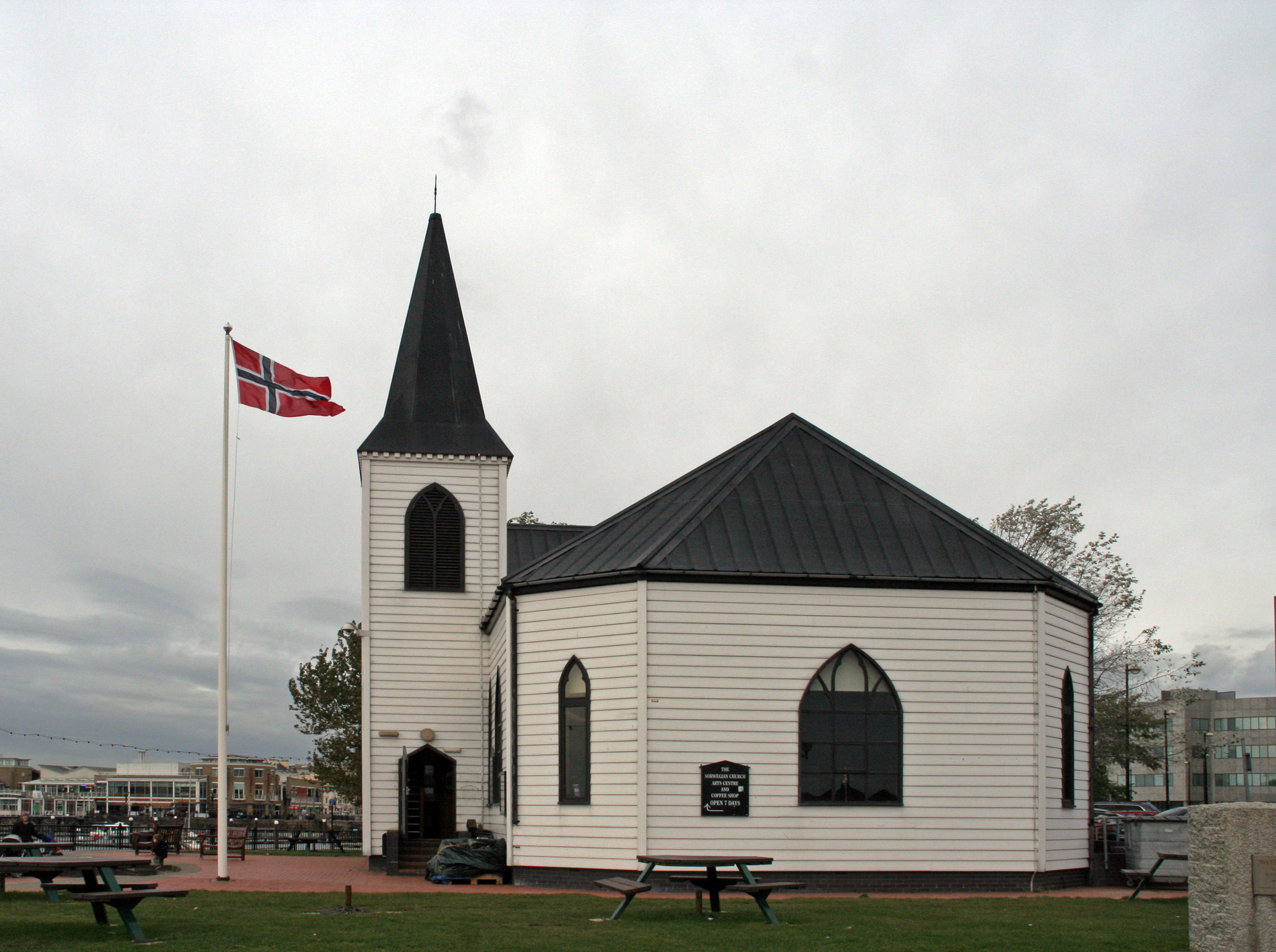
Norwegian Church

- All Souls Chapel, Cardiff, Cardiff Bay − a large chapel catering primarily to seamen (a converted ship had served in this capacity previously). Closed in 1952 and demolished.
- St Anne's Church, Roath – designed by a pupil of William Burges it opened in 1887, but closed in December 2015 with a £250,000 repair bill looming.
- St James the Great, Adamsdown – Built 1890-3, closed in 2006 and was converted into apartments.
- Lightship 2000, Cardiff Bay – a former lightship used as a church until 2013, with a minister from the United Reformed church.
- St Mary's, city centre – Cardiff's main church from the 12th century until it was destroyed by flooding in the 17th century.
- St Mary the Virgin, Caerau – 13th century church last used in 1973.
- Norwegian Church, Cardiff Bay – de-consecrated in 1974, subsequently relocated and re-opened as an arts centre.
- St Stephen's, Butetown – deconsecrated in 1972, subsequently becoming a theatre and live music venue until 2009.
- St Teilo's, St Fagans – ancient church re-erected at St Fagans National History Museum
- Wood Street Congregational Church, city centre – once the largest congregational chapel in South Wales. Demolished in the 1960s.

== See also ==
- List of cultural venues in Cardiff
- List of places in Cardiff
