= Church of St Denys, Lisvane =

Church in Cardiff, Wales

St Denys, Lisvane
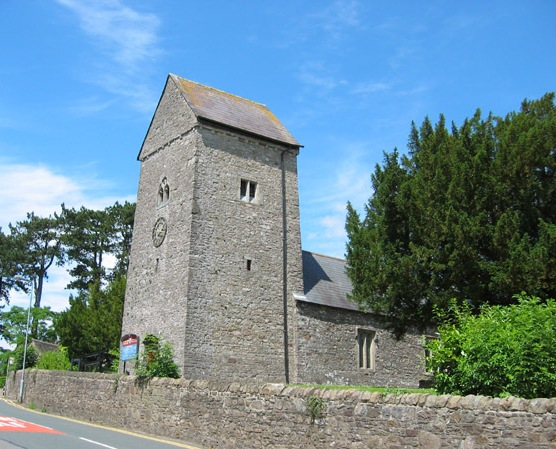
- St Denys, Lisvane
- 51.5406°N 3.1672°W
- Denomination: Anglican
- Website: www.stdenyschurch.org.uk

History
- Status: Active
- Dedication: Saint Isan

Architecture
- Heritage designation: Grade II*
- Designated: 28 January 1963

Specifications
- Materials: stone

Administration
- Diocese: Llandaff

The Church of St Denys is an Anglican church in the suburb of Lisvane, Cardiff. The church is ancient in origin, though the present building dates largely from the nineteenth century.

== Dedication ==
Denys is not a reference to Denis, the patron saint of Paris. The name is a locally created corruption of Dionysius, the Latin name used by Saint Isan.

== Early history ==
The precise date of the church's founding is unknown, though it is thought to date from around the same period as St Isan's in nearby Llanishen (which chose to dedicate itself to Isan's Celtic name), which would give an estimated date of around the 6th Century. The founder of the religious presence in the area is also unknown. It has been speculated that monks from Llandough, or possibly an influential landowner was responsible, though this is conjectural since no historical evidence concerning the church has survived from this period. The original structure would probably have been built of impermanent materials, as was common practice at this time (St Isan's is believed to have also began life in this form). The stone churches which replaced such constructions did not begin to proliferate until the Norman period, during which the church was a chapel of ease to St Mary's in Cardiff, which was still a separate and quite distant town.

== Later Rebuilds ==
The present building dates mostly from the 14th century. The church fell increasingly into decay in later centuries. By the 1840s, it was all but derelict, with a tiny congregation. Having passed centuries as a little-changed village, Lisvane began to expand in the later 19th century, and after 1861, the church's fortunes began to revive as Lisvane began to develop into an affluent suburb. In 1878 it was decided to restore the church, and it was comprehensively refurbished by architect Edwin Seward. Further modifications occurred in the 1920s and 30s, and in 1979, the whole building was reordered and enlarged, with the altar re-sited and the choir housed in the old sanctuary. The only surviving Norman elements of the building are the walls of the tower and the southern doorway.

== Listing ==
The church gained Grade II* Listed status in 1963.
