= HTB network =

Church network in England and Wales

The HTB network consists of churches planted by Holy Trinity Brompton (HTB) or by HTB plants themselves. As such, it is a network of Anglican churches within the Church of England and the Church in Wales that are linked back to HTB.

The network now comprises more than 30 of the approximately 490 churches in the Diocese of London, and 66 churches nationwide across 17 dioceses. In recent years the Church Commissioners have released tens of millions of pounds of funding to help HTB plants revitalise strategic churches.

== Controversies ==
St Sepulchre-without-Newgate was known as the National Musicians' Church for 70 years until August 2017 when hiring of the facilities for non-religious events was banned, against assurances which had been given when HTB took over in 2013. Fifty figures from the musical world signed an open letter urging reversal of the ban and preservation of the church's "unique national cultural remit". Acting Bishop of London Pete Broadbent tried to convince the church to reverse its ban. Andrew Earis, director of music at St Martin-in-the-Fields and former director of music at St Sepulchre, said the decision was "doing irreparable harm to the church as a whole". By 2024, the church was no longer a member of the HTB network, and priest-in-charge Nick Mottershead spoke of work to "rebuild a reputation around being the Musicians’ Church and to redefine and communicate that this is a place that is welcoming to all." He sought to make the church's support for same-sex blessings "very clear", due in part to the perception that it remained connected to HTB.

The 2020 relaunch (as 'Citizen Church') of Church of St Andrew & St Teilo in Cardiff was controversial with members of the existing congregation. A petition titled "Save St Teilo's" asking the diocese to "reverse its decision to place a new resource church in the place of ours" received almost 2,000 signatures. At an open parish meeting, "expressed opinion was unanimously opposed". Several people interviewed by the Church Times emphasised the importance of the church being welcoming to LGBT members. Parish treasurer Phil Hawkins described the decision to push ahead with plans without parish consultation as "appalling".

A lay leader who came out as lesbian at St Luke's Church, Kentish Town reported that she had been "forced out" of the church and her position as bible study leader by vicar Jon March, when new rules for living "beyond reproach" were introduced after telling him of her sexuality, rules which among other things prohibited being in a same-sex relationship. An internal investigation commissioned by the Bishop of Edmonton found that there were pastoral failings but not an abuse of power. The woman, who received three years of therapy for symptoms of PTSD, said: "When a vicar or church rejects someone because of who they are or what they do or what they believe, it feels like God has rejected me." Andrew Foreshew-Cain, the first Church of England vicar to marry a same-sex partner, said: "In a church like St Luke’s and Holy Trinity Brompton there is a deliberate attempt to hide what their actual attitudes are to LGBT people, but also to women in leadership."

== List of church plants ==
This list is mostly drawn from the HTB website. Numbers refer to the maps below.

#	Church	Year of plant	Diocese	Planted from	Plant leaders	URL	Reference(s)
1	Holy Trinity, Brompton (HTB)	N/A	London	N/A	N/A		
2	Church of St Barnabas, Kensington (STBK)	1985	London	HTB	John Irvine		
3	St Mark's Church, Battersea Rise (City Rise)	1987	Southwark	HTB	Paul Perkin		
4	St Paul's, Onslow Square (HTB Onslow Square)	1991	London	HTB	Nicky Lee		
5	Oak Tree Anglican Fellowship	1993	London	STBK	Tim Sudworth		
6	Ascension Church, Balham	1994	Southwark	SMBR	Andrew White		
7	St Stephen's Church, Westbourne Park	1994	London	HTB	Tom Gillum		
8	Christ Church, Fulham (CCF)	1997	London	HTB Onslow Square	Stuart Lees		
9	St Paul's Church, Hammersmith (SPH)	2000	London	HTB	Simon Downham		
10	Church of St George the Martyr, Holborn	2002	London	HTB	John Valentine		
11	St Mark's Church, Tollington Park	2005	London	HTB	Sandy Millar		
12	St Saviour's, Hanley Road	post-2005	London	St Mark's Tollington Park			
13	Emmanuel, Holloway	post-2005	London	St Mark's Tollington Park			
14	St Paul's Church, Shadwell (SPS)	2005	London	HTB	Ric Thorpe and Jez Barnes		
15	Holy Trinity Church, Swiss Cottage (The Lighthouse)	2006	London	HTB	Andy Keighley and Graham Singh		
16	Hope Church Islington; Formerly St Mary Magdalene and St David's, Islington	2006	London	St George Holborn	Paul Zaphiriou		
17	St Peter's Church, Battersea (SPB)	2007	Southwark	SMBR	Patrick Malone		
18	St Peter's Church, Brighton	2009	Chichester	HTB	Dan Millest		
19	St Alban's Church, Fulham	2010	London	HTB and SPH	Matt Hogg		
20	St John's, Hoxton	2010	London	Hope Church Islington	Graham Hunter		
21	Church of All Hallows, Bow	2010	London	SPS	Cris Rogers		
22	St Paul's Church, Brixton	2010	Southwark	Ascension Balham	Ben Goodyear		
23	St Peter's Church, Bethnal Green	2010	London	SPS	Adam Atkinson		
24	St Francis Community Church, Dalgarno Way	2010	London	HTB	Azariah France-Williams		
25	St John's Hampton Wick	2010	London	HTB	Graham Singh and Jerry Field		
26	St Augustine's, Queen's Gate (HTB Queen's Gate)	2010	London	HTB	Paul Cowley		
27	St Luke's Church, Kentish Town (SLKT)	2011	London	HTB	Jon March		
28	St Paul's Church, Hounslow West	2012	London	HTB	Libby Etherington		
29	Holy Trinity Church, Clapham	2012	Southwark	HTB	Jago Wynne		
30	St Sepulchre-without-Newgate	2013 No longer a member, as of 2024.	London	HTB and St George Holborn	David Ingall		
31	St Luke's Church, Millwall	2013	London	SPS	Ed Dix		
32	St Thomas's Church, Norwich (STN) (Note: Operates as one church in three church buildings: St Thomas's Norwich, St Barnabas' Heigham and St Alban's Grove Walk)	2013	Norwich	HTB	Ian Dyble		
33	St Cuthman's Church, Whitehawk	2013	Chichester	St Peter's Brighton	Steve Tennant		
34	Church of St Dionis, Parsons Green	2014	London	HTB	Pat Allerton		
35	St Swithun's Church, Bournemouth (Note: Operates as one church in two church buildings: St Swithun's Bournemouth and St Clement's Boscombe)	2014	Winchester	HTB	Tim Matthews		
36	Holy Trinity Church, Hastings	2014	Chichester	St Peter's Brighton	Simon and Sarah Larkin		
37	St Swithin's Church, Lincoln	2014	Lincoln	HTB	Jim and Vicky Prestwood		
38	Christ Church, Spitalfields	2014	London	SPS			
39	St Luke's Church, Gas Street	2015	Birmingham	HTB	Tim Hughes		
40	St Alban's Church, Norwich	2015	Norwich	STN			
41	St Barnabas' Church, Heigham	c. 2015	Norwich	STN			
42	St George's Church, Gateshead	2016	Durham	HTB	Rich Grant		
43	Harbour Church, Portsmouth (Note: Operates as one church in three buildings: Harbour Church, St George's, Portsea and St Alban's, Copnor)	2016	Portsmouth	St Peter's Brighton	Alex Wood		
44	St Matthias' Church, Canning Town	2016	Chelmsford	All Hallows Bow	Ben Atkins		
45	Church of St Matthias, Plymouth	2016	Exeter	HTB	Olly and Ali Ryder		
46	Trinity Church, Nottingham	2016	Southwell and Nottingham	HTB	Jonny and Amy Hughes		
61	St John-at-Hackney (Note: Operates as one church in two buildings: St John-at-Hackney and St Luke at Hackney)	2016	London	HTB	Al and Olivia Gordon		
47	St Clement's Church, Boscombe	2017	Winchester	St Swithun's Bournemouth	Tim Matthews		
48	St Mark's Church, Coventry	2017	Coventry	HTB	Phil Atkinson		
49	St Werburgh's Church, Derby	2017	Derby	HTB	Phil and Anna Mann		
50	St Matthias' Church, Fiveways	2017	Chichester	St Peter's Brighton	Tom and Katy Holbird		
51	St John the Baptist's Church, Crawley	2017	Chichester	St Peter's Brighton	Steve and Liz Burston		
52	St Peter's Church, West Molesey	2017	Guildford	St John's Hampton Wick	Alex Munro		
53	St Nicholas' Church, Bristol	2018	Bristol	HTB	Toby and Gill Flint		
54	St Mary's Church, Southampton	2018	Winchester	HTB and SLKT	Jon and Hannah Finch		
55	Pattern Church, Swindon	2018	Bristol	HTB	Joel Sales		
56	St Chad's Church, Whitleigh	2018	Exeter	St Matthias Plymouth	Rob Fowler		
57	Christ Church, Feltham	2018	London	St Stephen's Twickenham	Andy Watkins		
58	St Margaret's, Aspley	2018	Southwell and Nottingham	HTB	Rich Atkinson		
59	St George's, Portsea	2018	Portsmouth	Harbour Church Portsmouth			
60	St Alban's, Copnor	2018	Portsmouth	Harbour Church Portsmouth			
62	St Luke at Hackney	2018	London	St John-at-Hackney			
63	St Matthew's Church, Exeter	2019	Exeter	HTB	Ed and Jess Hodges		
64	St John's Minster, Preston	2019	Blackburn	HTB	Sam and Hannah Haigh		
65	St Mary's, Andover	2019	Winchester	HTB	Chris and Nai Bradish		
66	St Peter's, Vauxhall	2019	Southwark	Holy Trinity Clapham	Emma and Michael John		
67	Hope Street Church, Wrexham	2020	St Asaph (Wales)	HTB	Rachel and Andy Kitchen		
68	St Barnabas Penny Lane, Liverpool	2020	Liverpool	HTB	Alex and Laura Rayment		
69	St Francis, Mackworth	2020	Derby	St Werburgh's Derby	Andy and Rachel Bond		
70	St Leonard's, Shoreditch	2020	London	Hackney Church	Al Gordon, Naomi Maxwell and Toby Thomas		
71	St Wilfrid, Bognor Regis	2020	Chichester	St Peter's Brighton	Joel and Lella Mennie		
72	Citizen Church, Cardiff	2021	Llandaff (Wales)	Harbour Church Portsmouth	Ryan and Ellie Forey		
73	Nelson Street Church, Rochdale	2021	Manchester	HTB	Janie and James Cronin		
74	St Wins, Totton	2021	Winchester	Saint Mary's Southampton	Ali and Steve Hill		
75	River Church Ipswich	2021	St Edmundsbury and Ipswich	HTB and St Augustine's Ipswich	Matt and Amy Key		
76	The Well, Swindon	2021	Bristol	Pattern Church, Swindon	Paul Freeland		
77	Bay Church, Torbay	2022	Exeter	Church of St Matthias, Plymouth and Harbour Church Portsmouth	Matt and Fiona Bray	[76]	
78	St Wilfrid's Wilford	2022	Nottingham and Southwell	Trinity Church Nottingham	George and Katie White		
79	Concord Church, Bristol	2022	Bristol	St Nicholas' Church, Bristol	Andy Carter		
80	Fabric Church	2023	Manchester	HTB	Mark & Jo Roper and Nakita Ainsworth		
81	St George's	ref	Newcastle-under-Lyme	HTB	Martin Ball	[77] https://www.stgn.org/	

== Maps ==
=== London ===
London churches in the HTB network

=== England & Wales ===
England churches in the HTB network
