= Tabernacle Chapel, Roath =

Church in Cardiff, Wales

Tabernacle
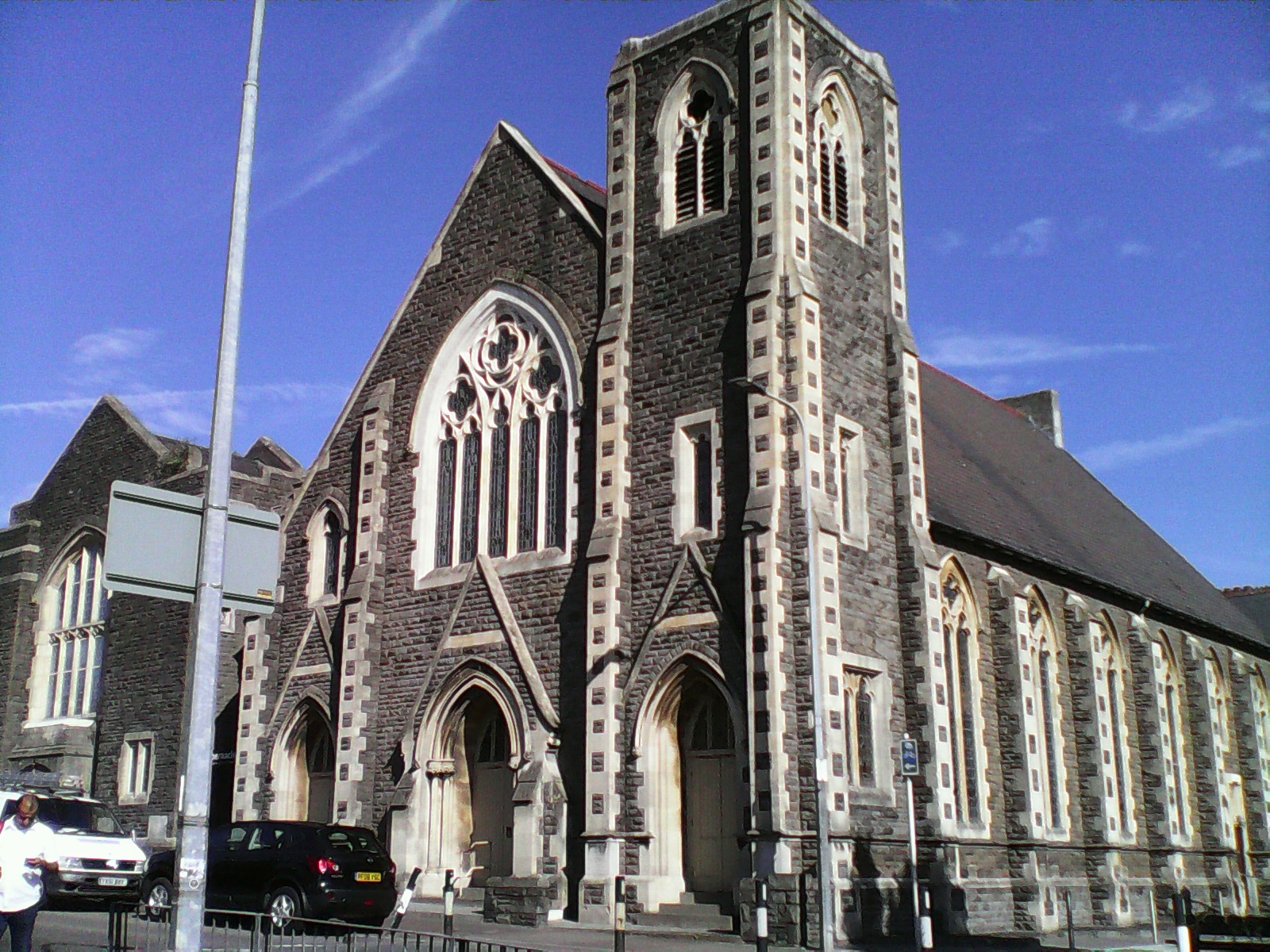
- The church and hall in October 2018
- Tabernacle
- 51.4991°N 3.1744°W
- Denomination: Evangelical
- Previous denomination: URC, Congregational
- Website: tabernaclecardiff.org

History
- Former name(s): Roath Park URC, Roath Park Congregational Church
- Founded: 1897

Architecture
- Functional status: Active
- Heritage designation: Grade II
- Designated: 31 March 1999
- Architect(s): Habershon, Fawkner & Co.
- Style: Neo Gothic
- Groundbreaking: 21 July 1909
- Completed: 1910

Specifications
- Capacity: 650
- Materials: stone

Tabernacle (Welsh Tabernacl) is a listed place of worship in the suburb of Roath, Cardiff, Wales.

== History ==
=== Congregational Church ===
The Roath Park Congregational Church began in 1897, when a tin tabernacle was erected to serve the growing population in what had formerly been a largely rural area, but was rapidly urbanising by the early 20th century. It was located in Mackintosh Place, but the congregation moved to the church's present location in 1910, when the building by Habershon, Fawkner & Company was completed. In its early days, the church's finances were often delicate, to the point that it was sometimes difficult to pay the minister's stipend, though the congregation saw considerable growth in the years after the permanent building was finished. By 1920, he church had 400 members and was in use by various groups— it was reported to often be necessary to arrive early on a Sunday in order to secure a seat. The tin tabernacle was moved next door to the church, where it served as a hall, and was later replaced by a purpose-built hall in 1927. During the Second World War, the church suffered bomb damage which necessitated a refurbishment, which was completed in 1950. During the refit, the pinnacles which had capped the tower since 1910 were removed and were not replaced.

=== United Reformed Church ===
When the majority of British Congregational and Presbyterian churches merged in 1972, the church became the Roath Park United Reformed Church. Due to the merge, the area now had a number of large UR churches in tight concentration— as well as Roath Park, St Andrew's in Roath and Plasnewydd United Reformed (both of which are around a similar size), and Minster Road United Reformed were far in excess of the number of worshippers in a time when church attendances were falling nationally. Minster Road combined with Star Street URC (which subsequently closed upon the merger). Already struggling, Roath Park was left in pitiful financial grounds after needing to fund major repairs in the 1990s, after which it became a joint pastorate with Minster Road. Eventually, the church closed when it formally merged with Minster Road in 2008, and the remaining congregants transferred to the latter (whose name was changed to Parkminster to reflect the union).

=== Independent Evangelical Church ===
The church was put up for sale after closure. In January 2009, it was purchased by Tabernacle Cardiff, a splinter group from Heath Evangelical Church which had been meeting in the Heath Citizen's Hall since 2003. The building was purchased on a bid of just over the guide price of £425,000 owing to donations and pledges by friends and members of the church which led to it obtaining a mortgage. Worship began again in the building in March 2009. Now thriving, the church holds services in both English and Welsh.

== Listing ==
In 1999, the building gained Grade II Listed status 'primarily for its well-integrated interior containing handsome ceiling and trusses, supported on two levels of columns with Gothic braces, elegant gallery fronts and original fittings'.

== Heath Evangelical Church ==
Heath Evangelical Church began as the Heath Forward Movement Hall, which opened on 11 November 1900, with the first members being enrolled on 27 January 1901. Highly active during the 1904-1905 Welsh revival (it was once described as being 'alive with Revival fire'), the church was replaced by the present building in 1906. Seth Joshua's mission reported in 1907 that the church was 'waiting the coming tide', and it was not unknown for people to queue for services at this stage. The church pursued a strong missionary program both at home and abroad. After some years of disagreement in the 1960s regarding the rising trend of ecumenicalism, the congregation seceded from the Welsh Calvinistic Methodist Church on 1 January 1971 after struggle which involved a sit-in. In the closing decades of the 20th century, it was one of the best-attended churches in Cardiff, with 900 members in the 1980s. Work amongst Cardiff's student community also became prominent, with the church appointing a full-time worker for overseas students in 1981. In 1985, a group left to form Highfields Church, and moved into the disused Cathays Presbyterian Church in 1997.

== Gallery ==
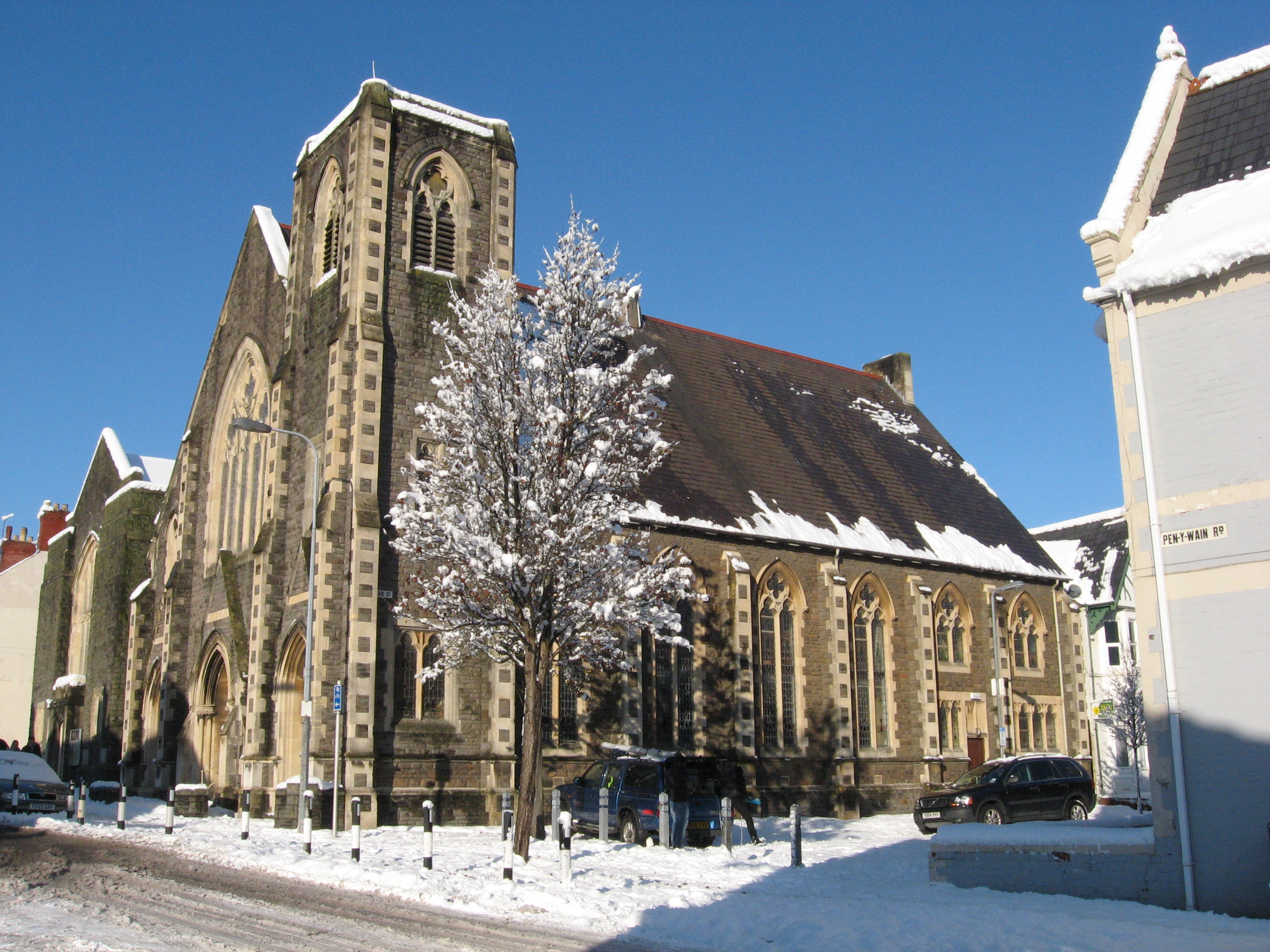
Church in 2010

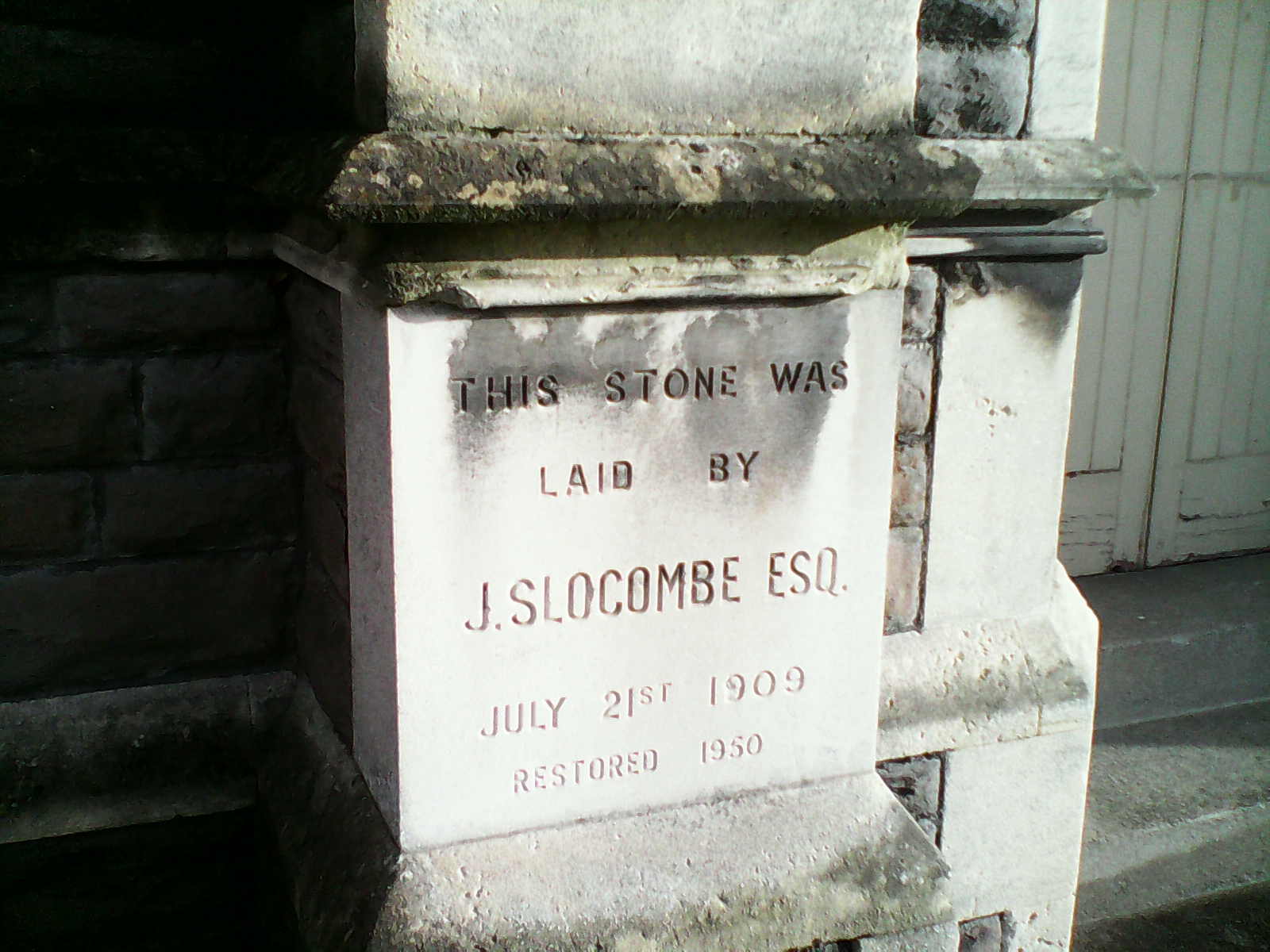
Founding stone for 1909 and 1950

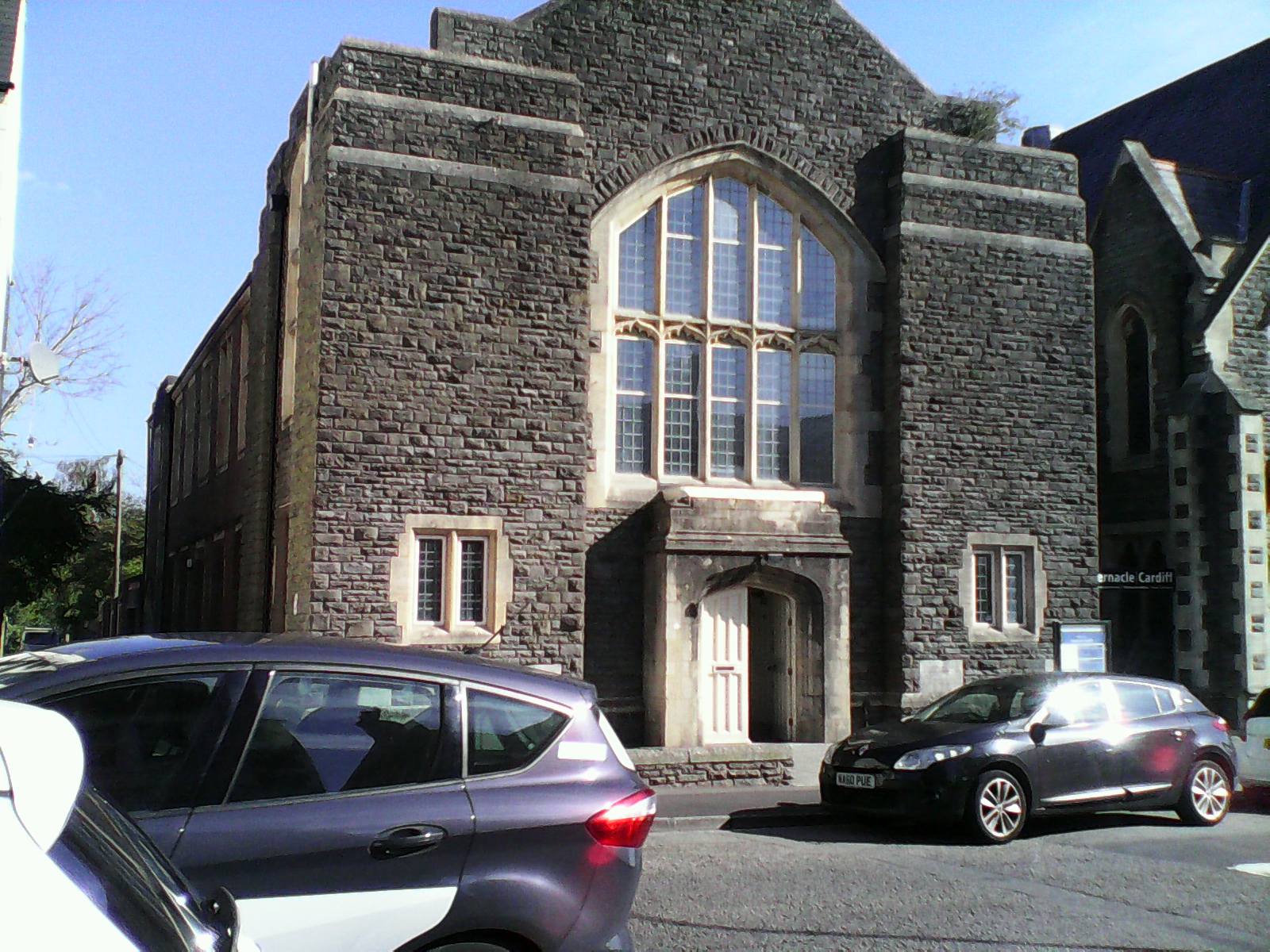
The 1927 church hall

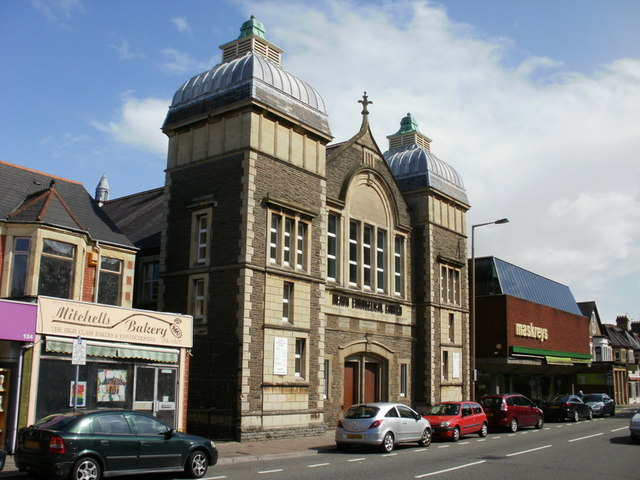
Heath Evangelical Church. The business to the left of the church is now a bookshop and cafe operated by the church.

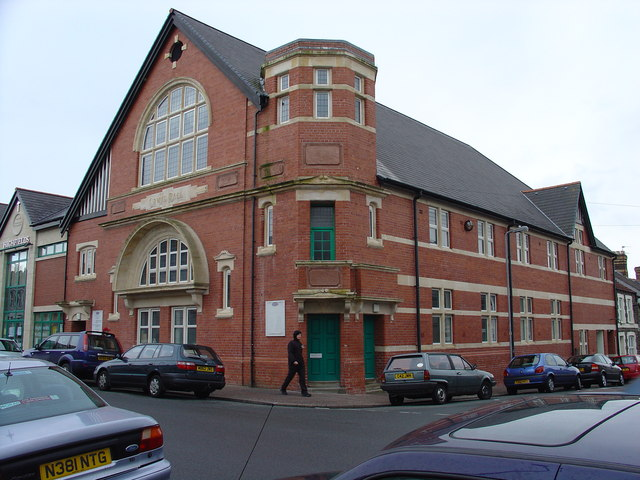
Highfields Church
