= St George the Martyr, Holborn =

Coordinates: 51.5210°N 0.1224°W

St George the Martyr Holborn
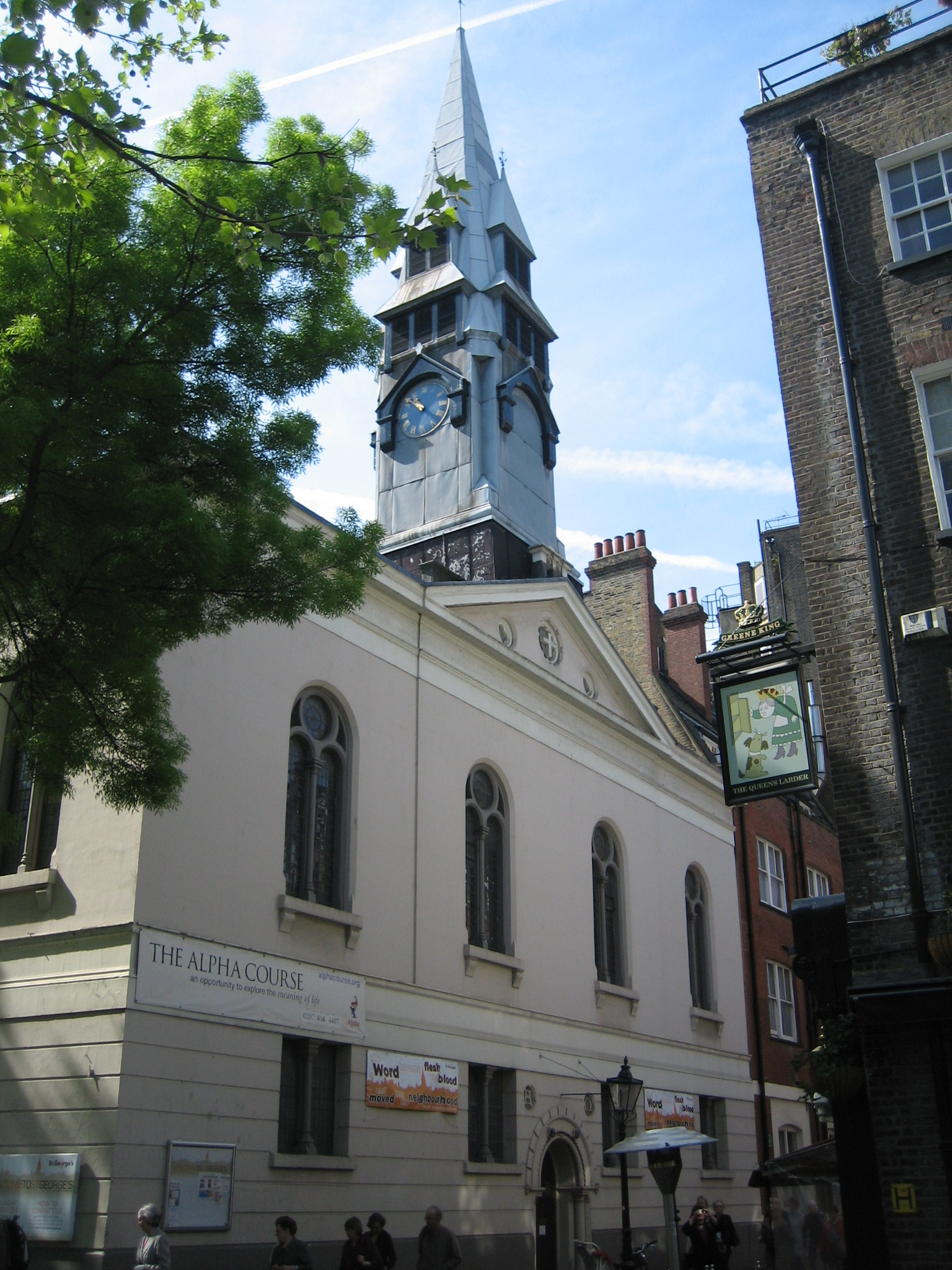
- St George the Martyr Holborn
- Location: 44 Queen Square, London
- Country: England
- Denomination: Anglican
- Churchmanship: Low Church
- Website: sgtm.org

Architecture
- Heritage designation: Grade II*
- Designated: 24 October 1951
- Architect(s): Arthur Tooley, John Buonarotti Papworth, Samuel Sanders Teulon
- Years built: 1703

Administration
- Diocese: London
- Archdeaconry: Hampstead
- Parish: Holborn St George

St George the Martyr Holborn is an Anglican church located at the south end of Queen Square, Holborn, in the London Borough of Camden. It is dedicated to Saint George, and was originally so-called to distinguish it from the later nearby church of St. George's Bloomsbury, with which it shared a burial ground (now St George's Gardens). While the historical name remains its formal designation, it is today known simply as St George's Holborn.

== History ==
The church was built in 1703–06 by Arthur Tooley, as a chapel of ease to St Andrew, Holborn. Tooley was paid £3,500 to build the chapel and two houses by a group of fifteen trustees including Sir Streynsham Master. It was later bought by the Commission for Building Fifty New Churches and became a parish church in 1723, receiving the dedication to St George, in honour of Streynsham Master's governorship of Fort St George in India.

The antiquary William Stukeley was the rector from 1747 to his death there in 1765.

The church was remodelled in the early nineteenth century by J. B. Papworth, who added a bell-tower and two frontages to what had previously been a plain brick building, and once again in 1867–69 by S. S.Teulon, who almost entirely changed the exterior, removed the galleries and added the present columns and roof.

After the death of Joseph Stalin the Rev. Stanley Evans, M.A. gave a memorial service in his honour on 13 March 1953.

It was at this church that Ted Hughes and Sylvia Plath married on Bloomsday in 1956.

== Conservation ==
The church was designated a Grade II* listed building on 24 October 1951.

=== Organ ===
The organ has been listed as a historic instrument by the British Institute of Organ Studies. The first organ was erected in 1773; it has been rebuilt over the years.

== See also ==
- HTB network
