= Llanishen Golf Club =

Golf club in Cardiff, Wales

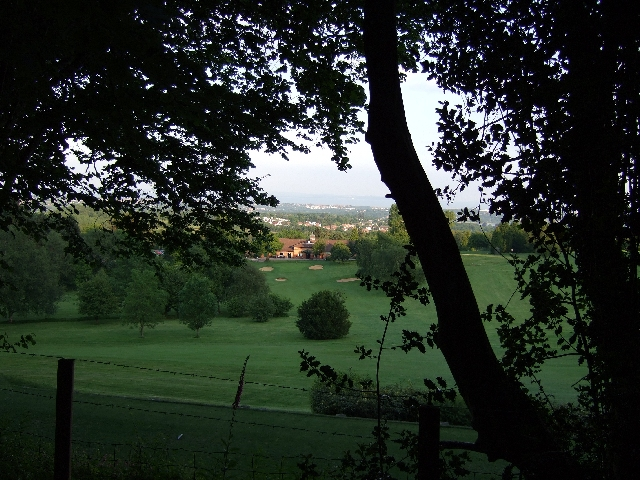
- Llanishen Golf Club

- Location in Cardiff
- 51°33′9″N 3°11′27″W

Club information
- Location: Thornhill, Cardiff, Wales
- Established: 1905
- Tota holes: 18

Llanishen Golf Club is a golf course in Thornhill, north of Llanishen on the northern outskirts of Cardiff, Wales. It lies across the M4 motorway from Cardiff. The parkland course, which was 5338 yards as of 2005, is set to the backdrop of Caerphilly Mountain.

== History ==
Llanishen Golf Club was established in 1905. It originally began as Lisvane Golf Club, which predated Radyr Golf Club (est. 1902). In April 1995 a new clubhouse, with a club and lounge bar and restaurant was inaugurated.

Between 2007 and 2009 it underwent a change, with a drainage programme to reduce moisture on the greens, and as a result they're some of the driest in Wales. In August 2015 an 86-year-old golfer sank a hole-in-one from the 16th par 3 tee.
