= Saint Isan =

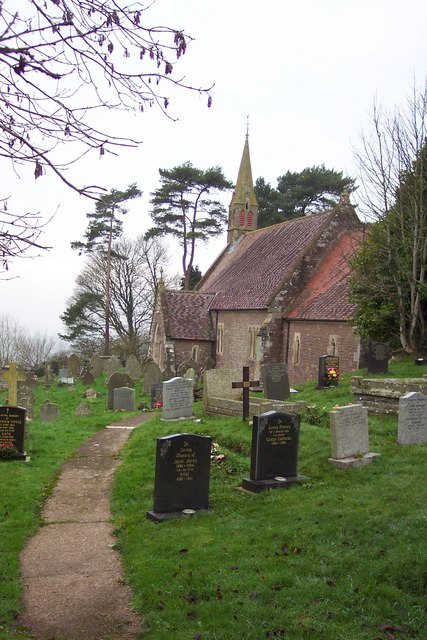
St Isan's church, Llanishen, Monmouthshire.

Saint Isan was a 6th-century saint of South Wales and Patron Saint of Llanishen in Cardiff, Wales.

He was said to have been a follower of the 6th-century Celtic teacher St Illtyd. In A.D. 535 he and Saint Edeyrn came eastwards from the small religious settlement of Llandaff, aiming to establish churches, in the area around Caerphilly mountain. The sites they choose had fresh water from the Nant Fawr stream.

Isan established a settlement in what later became known as Llanishen in A.D. 537. The St Isan's Church was established on the site of 12th century church foundations.

His co-worker Edeyrn was reputed to have travelled widely, and as a result there are churches in North and South Wales dedicated to his memory. St Edeyrn gathered together a community of about 300 that lived and worshipped in the Llanedeyrn area.

Isan is remembered in churches at Llanishen, Monmouthshire and Llanishen, Cardiff.
