= Conway Road Methodist Church =

Church in Cardiff, Wales

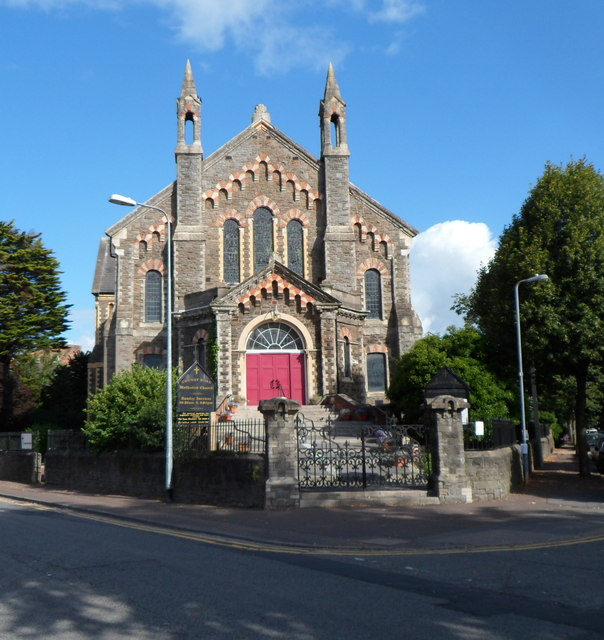
- Conway Road Methodist Church
- 51.8457°N 3.2028°W
- Denomination: Methodist Church of Great Britain

History
- Status: Active
- Founded: 1859

Architecture
- Heritage designation: Grade II
- Designated: 19 May 1975
- Architect(s): Habershon & Pite
- Groundbreaking: 1869
- Completed: 1871

Specifications
- Capacity: 1100
- Materials: sandstone, brick

Clergy
- Priest(s): Deacon Philip Osborne, Rev. Paul Martin

Conway Road Methodist Church is a Nonconformist chapel in Canton, Cardiff. It stands at the junction of Conway Road and Romilly Crescent and has been a Grade II Listed Building since 1975. It is the largest Methodist chapel still in use in Cardiff.

== History ==
The church began life in 1859, located in a much plainer building on nearby Romilly Road. In the 1860s, the decision was taken to move to larger premises, and the original building was sold off. It was bought by Congregationalists, though is now in use by the Plymouth Brethren. Architects Habershon & Pite designed the replacement building: a large construction with two spires, which was markedly grander than many other Nonconformist chapels in Cardiff at the time. Its construction was aided by a £700 donation from Lewis Davies, a wealthy coal magnate. Despite its large size, rising congregation numbers prompted extension of the structure shortly after the first build was finished, with transepts and an apse being installed. The completed building of 1871 had a seating capacity of 1100.

Whilst many Nonconformist chapels in Cardiff had mixed fortunes, Conway Road thrived, with a large and prosperous congregation. In 1893, the church was so wealthy that it was able to open the John Wesley Centenary School for the use of its Sunday Scholars. This building had a capacity of 700 and also had its own cricket field and tennis courts.

On 8 July 1915, the church was severely damaged by a fire which all but destroyed its original roof. The pulpit, however survived on account of its being made from stone. The damage was repaired, with the Arts and Crafts roof being replaced in the Neo-Georgian style. The present stained glass dates predominantly from the 1920s, and the organ from 1920. The church continued to prosper through the Great Depression; by the 1930s, it had a Sunday School of 900, which required 100 teachers.

In 1968, the Sunday school building of 1893 was sold to the Urdd Gobaith Cymru. Its facilities were replaced by alterations made to the basement and rear of the church. It has since been demolished and is now covered by apartments. Grade II listed status came in 1975.

== Recent Events ==
The church is part of the Conway Road Conservation Area. Although its congregation numbers are no longer as robust as they were in the 19th and early 20th Centuries, the church continues to play an active role in the community.
