= Church of St Andrew & St Teilo, Cathays =

Church in Cardiff, Wales

St Andrew & St Teilo
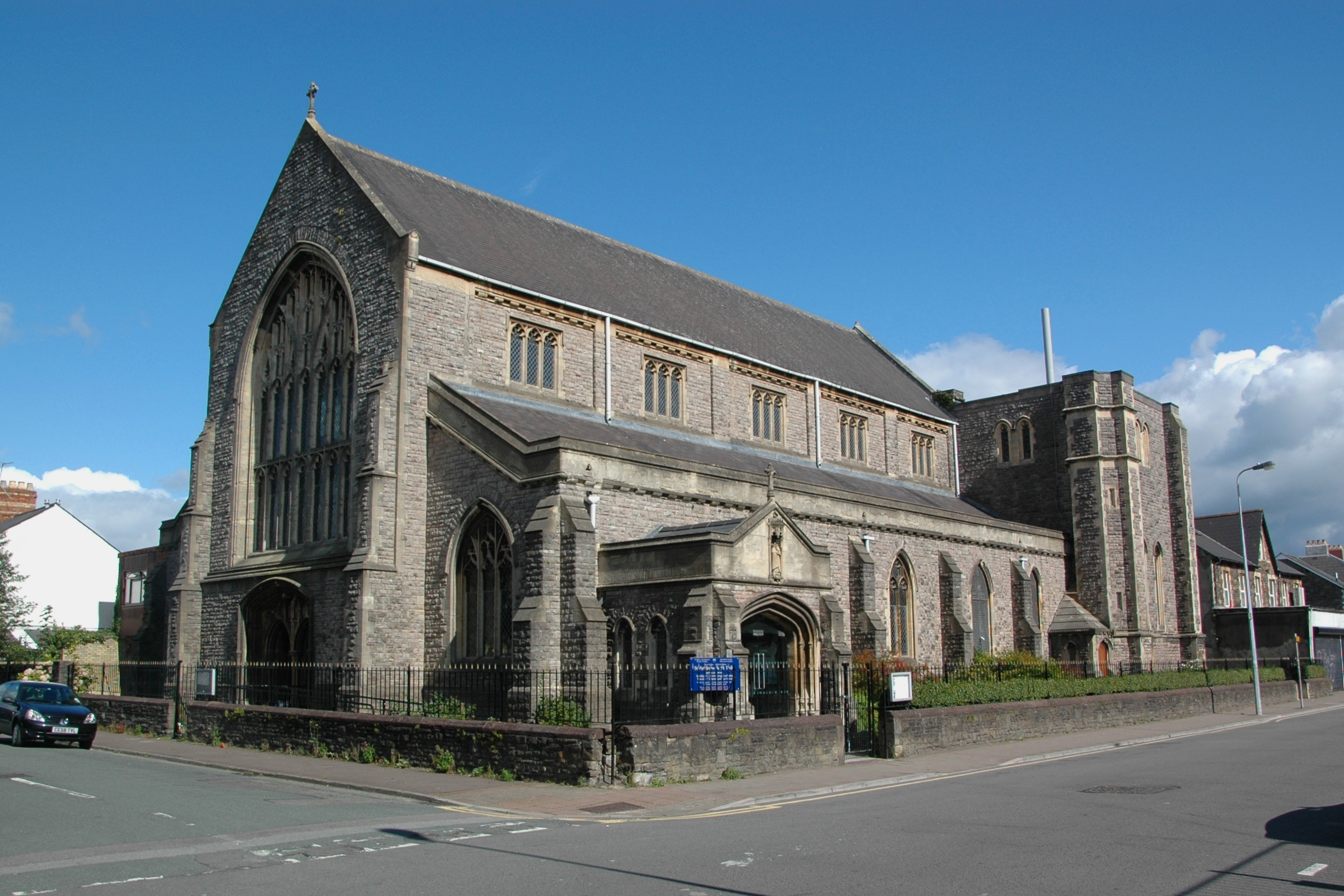
- St Andrew & St Teilo
- 51.4931°N 3.1781°W
- Denomination: Church in Wales
- Website: www.citizenchurch.org.uk

History
- Status: Active
- Founded: 1879
- Dedication: St Andrew, St Teilo
- Dedicated: 1897

Architecture
- Functional status: Sister church
- Heritage designation: Grade II
- Designated: 19 May 1975
- Architect: G.E. Halliday
- Style: Arts and Crafts
- Groundbreaking: 1895
- Completed: 1913
- Construction cost: £3000+

Specifications
- Materials: stone

Administration
- Diocese: Diocese of Llandaff
- Parish: Citizen Church, Cardiff

The Church of St Andrew and St Teilo is a Church in Wales church, located in Cathays, Cardiff. In 2020 the church was relaunched as Citizen Church, with a mission to serve students and young professionals.

== History ==
Originally just 'St Teilo's', the church was one of several (of numerous denominations) built in Cathays in the opening decades of the 20th century with the intent of servicing the large numbers of working people in the growing district. The Cathays Methodist Church, Woodville Baptist Church and Cardiff International Church are all nearby.

The church began life as a tin tabernacle in 1879. This structure, built to serve the large numbers of railroad workers who lived in the district, was enlarged in 1885. St Teilo's was formed as a separate parish, together with St Andrew's Church, St Andrew's Crescent, in 1884.

Work began on the permanent church in 1895, with £3000 being contributed to the project by the Mackintosh of Mackintosh. The aisles and nave were dedicated in 1897. The chancel was added in 1901. The architect's original plans had included a grand tower of similar dimensions to that of St John's in Cardiff city centre. The tower was begun in 1913 (a lady chapel being installed at the same time), but the plans proved overambitious, and only the lowermost portion of the tower was ever built — which does not even stretch above the roof of the nave. The reredos was installed by John Coates Carter in 1924. The church became Grade II listed in 1975.

The west window of the nave, which dates from 1919, is the largest in the Diocese of Llandaff.

In 1954 St Andrew's Church closed (later reconsecrated as Dewi Sant) and the congregation joined with St Teilo's.

=== HTB relaunch ===
In 2020 the church was relaunched as 'Citizen Church', becoming part of the network of Holy Trinity Brompton, with a mission to serve students and young professionals. The relaunch was controversial with members of the existing congregation. At an open parish meeting, "expressed opinion was unanimously opposed". The relaunch was funded by a partnership of the Church in Wales Evangelism Fund and the Church Revitalisation Trust, which is based at Holy Trinity Brompton.

Parish treasurer Phil Hawkins described the decision to push ahead with plans without parish consultation as "appalling". A petition titled "Save St Teilo's", asking the diocese to "reverse its decision to place a new resource church in the place of ours", and calling for St Teilo's to "remain an inclusive, flourishing, open church", received almost 2,000 signatures. Several people interviewed by the Church Times emphasised the importance of the church being welcoming to LGBT members. Revd David Sheen, in favour of the plan, said that a "lively, open Evangelical worship experience" was "sorely lacking" in the area.

The church was briefly constituted as a 'Conventional District' separate from the Parish of Cathays. Following the reorganisation of the Diocese of Llandaff into 'Ministry Areas' in 2021-22, the church forms part of the Parish of Citizen Church, Cardiff. There is a large student population in the area.

== St Michael & All Angels, Cathays ==
St Andrew and St Teilo formed part of the Parish of Cathays, established in 2007.. Also placed in the new parish was the nearby church of St Michael & All Angels. This was erected on Whitchurch Road in 1922 as the successor to the combined school and chapel dedicated to St Monica which had opened in 1893. The 1922 structure was a tin tabernacle, which lasted in use until the 1990s. In 1995, a development partner was found and the church moved to a new building located on the corner of Whitchurch Road and Gelligaer Street, directly beside its former location, which is now occupied by a block of retirement flats. After Citizen Church began to use St Andrew and St Teilo, St Michael’s church operated as a separate parish. Following the reorganisation into 'Ministry Areas' as from 2022 St Michaels has formed part of the Roath and Cathays Ministry Area. The church is a strong advocate of inclusion and a member church of the Inclusive Church network, and promotes work with the LGBT community.

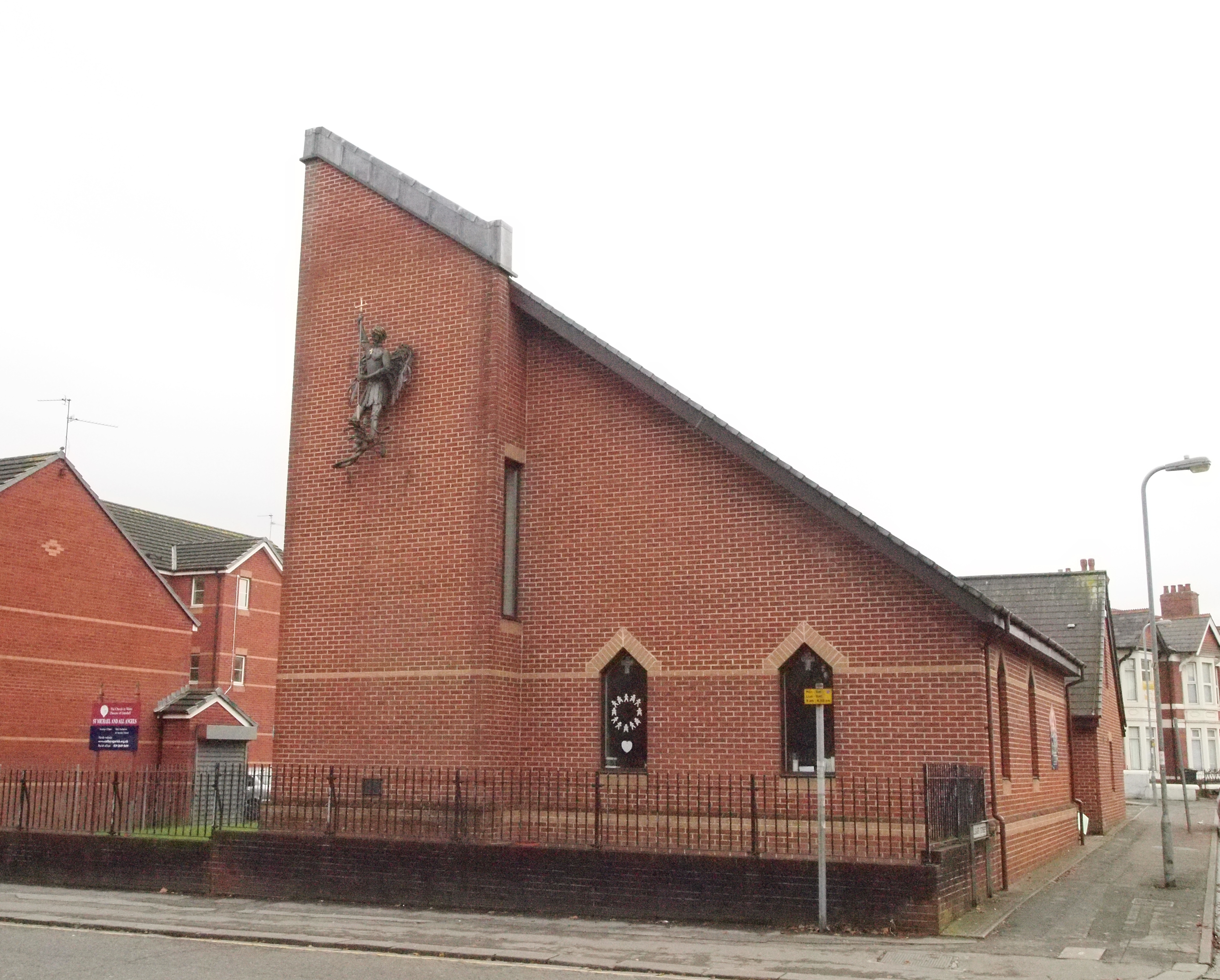
The new St Michael's, completed in 1995
