= Cathays Methodist Church =

Church in Cardiff, Wales

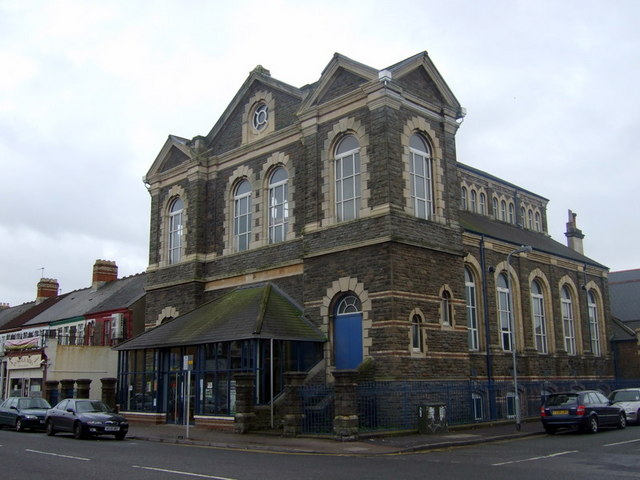
- Cathays Methodist Church
- 51.4949°N 3.1776°W
- Denomination: Methodist Church of Great Britain
- Website: cathaysmethodist.weebly.com

History
- Status: Active
- Founded: 1862

Architecture
- Heritage designation: Grade II
- Designated: 5 April 2000
- Style: Romanesque Revival
- Completed: 1890
- Construction cost: £5000

Specifications
- Capacity: originally 850
- Materials: Pennant sandstone, Bath stone

Cathays Methodist Church is a Methodist church (originally a chapel), located in Cathays, Cardiff. It is a Grade II listed building. It is part of the East Cluster in the Methodist Church in Cardiff and Caerphilly.

== History ==
A chapel was originally set up in 1862, being located on Cathays Terrace, near the present site. At the outset, it had a congregation of only six people. This building was sold in 1883, and was replaced by a school chapel. The adjoining church followed in 1890. Its services were well-attended, with evening congregations of over 900 worshipers. The church originally had elaborate, bulbous turrets on its towers, though these are no longer present. The organ dates from before 1914. A modern glass porch was added in the early 1990s. In 2006, the building was re-ordered horizontally, with the sanctuary at the top, a large hall on the upper ground floor and three meeting rooms below this.

Owing to its proximity to Cardiff University, the church (like the nearby Church of St Andrew & St Teilo, Cathays and the Woodville Baptist Church, now the Woodville Christian Centre), is often attended by students. The 1883 chapel now houses a furniture store.

The minister is Alexis Mahoney.

In 2000, the church became grade II listed.
