= Albany Road Baptist Church =

Church in Cardiff, Wales

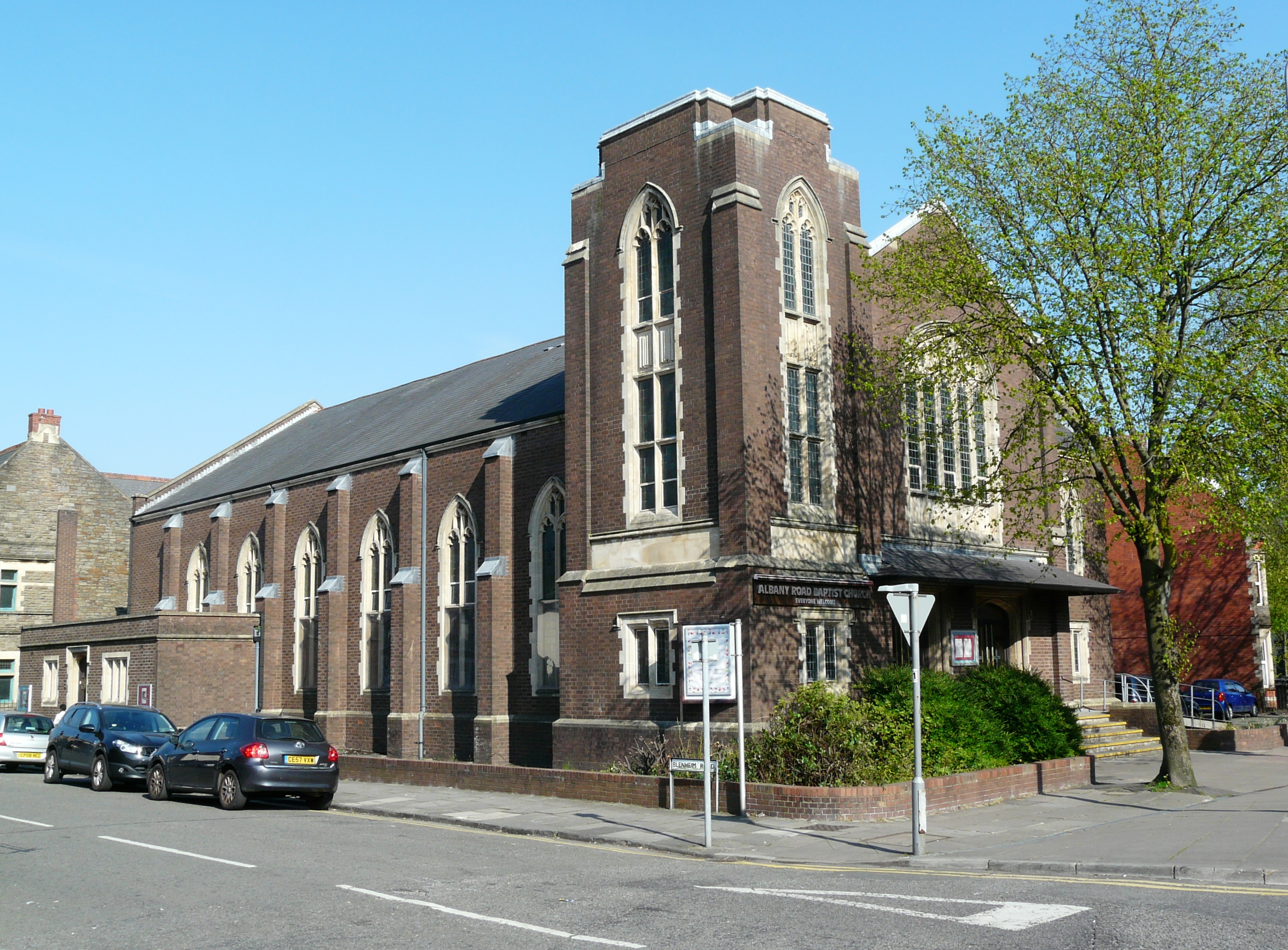
- The church of 1932, with the 1890s schoolroom at rear left.
- Albany Road Baptist Church
- 51.4940°N 3.1625°W
- Denomination: Baptist
- Website: www.albanyroadbaptist.org

History
- Status: Active
- Founded: 1894

Architecture
- Architectural type: Renaissance, Perpendicular
- Years built: 1898-1932

Specifications
- Capacity: 550
- Materials: stone, brown brick, Bath stone

Albany Road Baptist Church is a Baptist church located in Roath, Cardiff, Wales.

== History ==
The cause which would eventually become Albany Road Baptist Church began in 1894 in nearby Cottrell Road, located in rooms above a stable. Initially, it was Particular Baptist, with Communion available only to those baptised by Immersion, and membership denied to anyone involved in the drinks trade. In 1898, the congregation moved to its present location on Albany Road, and founded a large school chapel, which is still in use. Th adjacent corner site was left empty, as it was desired to build the planned church free of debt. The church became 'open communion' in 1916.

The building of the planned church was delayed through lack of funds and the First World War. It was eventually finished in 1932, though the tower was built far smaller than originally envisaged. In 1971, the school chapel was converted into upper and lower halls, and a coffee bar was added. A glass frontage and vestibule were added in the centennial year of 1994.

In the late 1960s, the church played a significant role in the founding of Christchurch United Church in Llanedeyrn. Albany Road presented proposals for the establishment of a new church in the expanding suburb, but the Roath Park Council of Churches to whom the plans were presented were unable to act on them. Being independent of any central control, Albany Road proceeded with the plans alone. It applied for one of the three sites on the estate which had been earmarked for church use. Several members of the church left to form the new congregation, which began worshiping in the hall of St Teilo's Church in Wales High School in 1967, then moving to a newly built hall in 1969 until the present church was completed in 1977.

== Present ==
The church is said to have 156 Baptist members. The church is heavily involved with the local community and runs several creches, a youth group, arts and crafts classes and lunch clubs.
