= Eglwys Dewi Sant, Cardiff =

Eglwys Dewi Sant
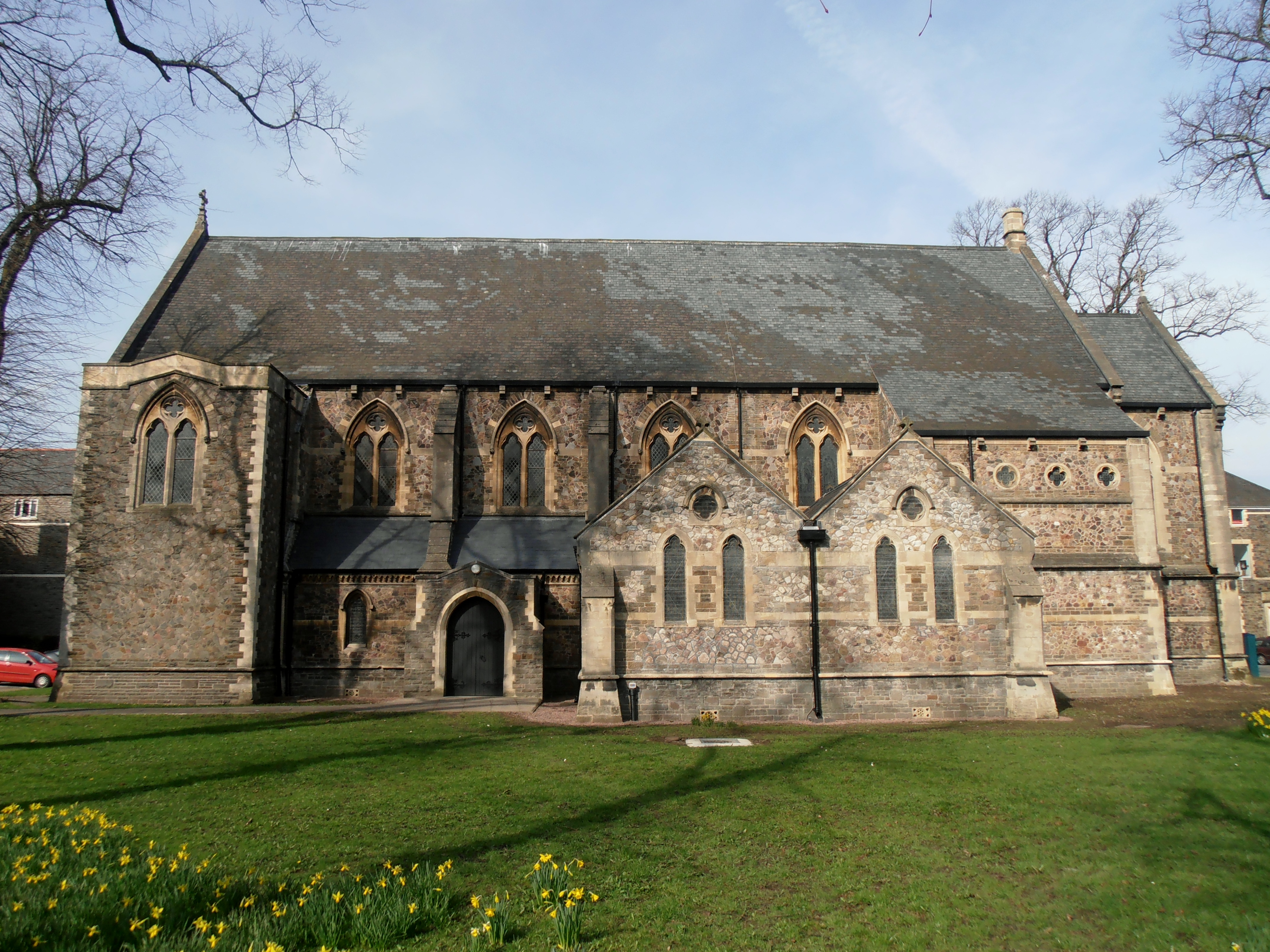

- Location within Cardiff
- 51.485°N 3.1741°W
- Location: Cardiff city centre
- Country: Wales
- Denomination: Church in Wales
- Website: eglwysdewisant.org.uk

History
- Former name(s): St Andrew's Church (to 1956)
- Dedication: St David
- Consecrated: 1 November 1956

Architecture
- Architect(s): Prichard & Seddon, Alexander Roos
- Completed: 1863

Administration
- Diocese: Llandaff

Clergy
- Vicar: Dyfrig C. Lloyd

Eglwys Dewi Sant (St David's Church, though originally dedicated to St Andrew) is a Grade II listed church building in the centre of Cardiff, Wales. It is the only church in the Diocese of Llandaff to conduct its services exclusively in the Welsh language.

== Location ==
The church is situated in the centre of a tree-lined oval green and is the focus of St Andrew's Crescent, just north of the city centre.

== History ==
St Andrew's Crescent was laid out as a formal space in the 1850s by the trustees of the Bute Estate, with the intention of having a church at its centre. In 1859, architects John Prichard and John Pollard Seddon (working as Prichard & Seddon) came up with a design with a wide nave and a crossing steeple.

John Newman describes the resulting church, dedicated to Saint Andrew, as a "rather unimpressive building". It was completed and consecrated in 1863 but had been reduced in ambition and cost. Alexander Roos, the Bute architect, had taken over in 1862. Transepts and vestries by William Butterfield, as well as porches on either side, were added in 1884–1886.

In 1856 the Marchioness of Bute also built a Welsh-language church in Tyndall Street, close to the new Cardiff Docks, but because of the changing demographics by 1870 the church was providing services exclusively in English. Though other churches provided some Welsh services, in 1889 a new Welsh-language church hall, Capel Dewi Sant, was constructed at Howard Gardens to the east of the town centre. A new church, Eglwys Dewi Sant, was opened next door in 1891. The church provided services to the Welsh-speaking community for 50 years, until it was severely damaged in the Cardiff Blitz.

By 1954, St Andrew's Church in St Andrew's Crescent was suffering from a dwindling congregation as local houses were being converted into offices. It closed and its congregation moved to St Teilo's Church, Cathays. The congregation of Eglwys Dewi Sant took the opportunity to move to St Andrew's, which was reconsecrated as Eglwys Dewi Sant on 1 November 1956.

Eglwys Dewi Sant church was designated in 1975 as a grade II listed building.

The church received a £100,000 grant from the Heritage Lottery Fund in 2009, to replace the failing roof.

== Services and events ==
To mark the church's 60th anniversary, in June 2017 Eglwys Dewi Sant held a flower festival, with more than half (£3600) of the proceeds being donated to Marie Curie Cancer Care.
