= Llanishen =

District and community in Cardiff, Wales

Coordinates: 51.529°N 3.189°W

- Community
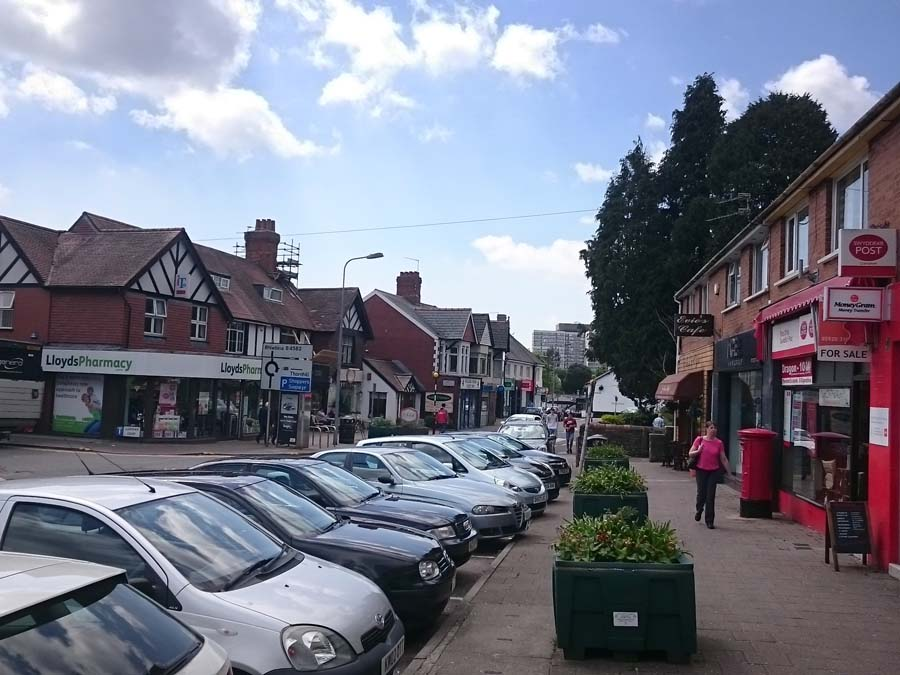
- Station Road, Llanishen

- Location within Cardiff
- Principal area: Cardiff
- Country: Wales
- Sovereign state: United Kingdom
- Police: South Wales
- Fire: South Wales
- Ambulance: Welsh
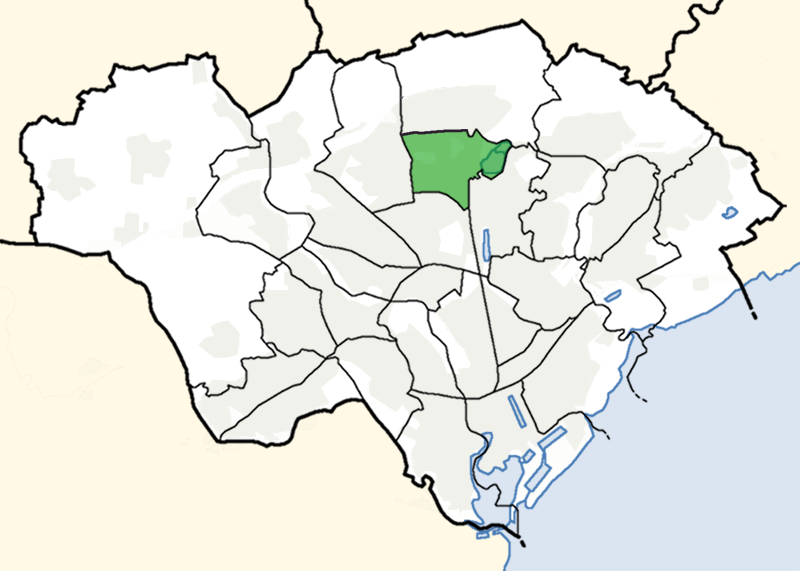
- List of places UK Wales Cardiff

Llanishen (Welsh: Llanisien, llan church + Isien Saint Isan) is a district and community in the north of Cardiff, Wales. Its population as of the 2011 census was 17,417.

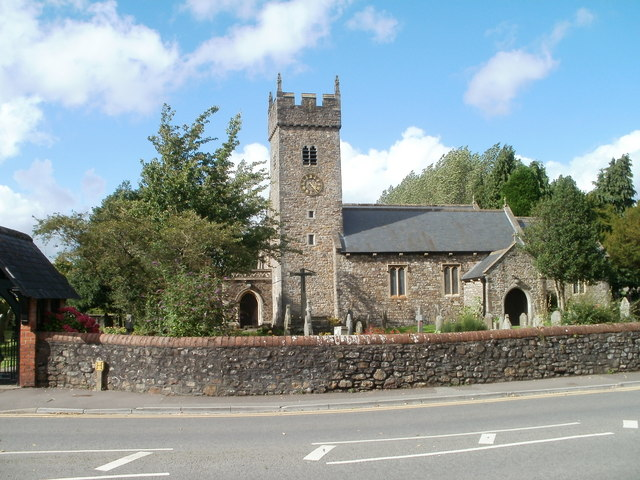
St Isan's parish church

Llanishen is the home of the former HMRC tax offices, the tallest buildings in north Cardiff and a landmark for miles around. The office complex overlooks the Crystal and Fishguard estates, the Parc Tŷ Glas industrial estate, Llanishen village, leafy suburban roads and parks that constitute the district. Llanishen is also home to a leisure centre and the former 60-acre (24 ha) Llanishen Reservoir, which is connected to a green corridor which bisects the city.

== History ==
Originally wooded farm land, in A.D. 535 two monks came eastwards from the small religious settlement of Llandaff, aiming to establish new settlements, or "llans", in the land below Caerphilly Mountain. With fresh water from the Nant Fawr stream, one of the monks, Isan, founded his llan on the site of the modern day Oval Park.

In 1089 at the Battle of the Heath, the Normans fought the Welsh Celts north of the settlement. The victorious Normans expanded Llanishen, starting work on a church to the north which was completed in the 12th century.

Although Oliver Cromwell had ties with Llanishen and the neighbouring village of Lisvane, the village remained undisturbed until 1871, when the Rhymney Railway was given permission to break the stranglehold of the Taff Vale Railway into Cardiff Docks. Building a line from Caerphilly to Crockherbtown Junction just north of Cardiff Queen Street, its 1.5 miles (2.4 km) tunnel to the north resulted in the accidental deaths of a number of people, many of them buried in St Isan's church.

The railway and the development of Llanishen railway station allowed wealthy Cardiff businesspeople to commute from the village to the city centre easily, resulting in the expansion of the village's population by 20,000 between 1851 and 1871. In 1887, the two new reservoirs of Llanishen were built to allow distribution of water collected in the Brecon Beacons to the city. In 1922, after expansion north by the city and south by the village, Llanishen became a suburb of Cardiff. Llanishen Golf Club was established in 1905.

Development of the village since has been through redevelopment of former farming and military land into commercial usage and housing development.

Thornhill was part of the Llanishen civil parish until November 2016, when a new community of Thornhill was created north of the Linear Park.

== Commerce and industry ==
=== Parc Tŷ Glas Industrial Estate ===
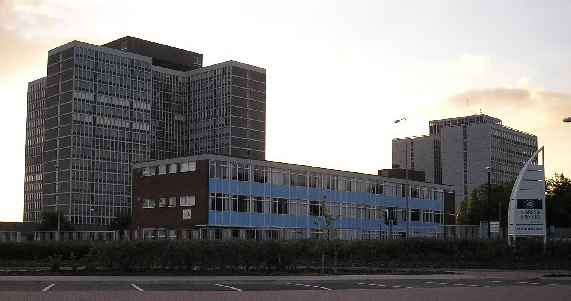
HM Government buildings, Phase 2 (left) and Gleider House – Phase 1 (right) with Ty Rhodfa in the foreground

Parc Tŷ Glas is home to the offices of the television station S4C and of the National Eisteddfod of Wales. HM Revenue and Customs (HMRC) formerly occupied Ty Glas, an 18-storey tower block (Phase 2), the 11-storey Gleider House (Phase 1), Ty Rhodfa (formerly the Valuation Office Agency) employing more than 2,700 staff on site in 2007 and ground floor offices for an enquiry centre or IREC. In 2020 the tax office vacated the site and moved to Central Square in the city centre.

The HM Government buildings are due to be demolished and replaced by up to 250 houses, 70 retirement apartments, a care home, employment units, and a health centre.

=== ROF Cardiff ===
Llanishen played a role in the Second World War effort. With the development of ROF Bridgend, a Royal Ordnance Factory, ROF Cardiff was opened in 1940 to take the explosives from Bridgend and produce tank, anti-tank and field guns. Air defences against paratroopers were placed in nearby fields, and facilities were strengthened in 1941 when the Royal Air Force established both a RAF Regiment base and a glider training facility. In 1943 the United States Army began using the facilities to hold troops and undertake local training, including basic flight in Tiger Cubs. The Americans left in June 1944 as the Allies prepared for D-Day. In 1987 ROF Cardiff became an Atomic Weapons Establishment. It closed down in February 1997.

Since its closure, ROF Cardiff has become the site of major housing developments by George Wimpey (called Parklands), Barratt (Ty Glas Square) and Leadbitter (Llys Enfys. Bellway and Persimmon/Charles Church created further housing between the AWE site and the HMRC building. The site will also host a new public open space, the final element to be constructed (2010), to include a children's play area, sports pitch and community garden. Part of the George Wimpey development has been named Watkins Square and the Barratt development Tasker Square – after Wales' famous Victoria Cross winner Sir Tasker Watkins, who died during 2007.

=== Other offices ===
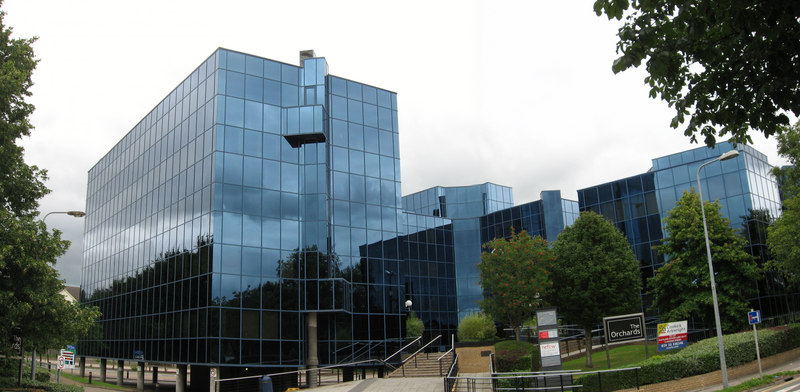
The Orchards complex

The Orchards complex, formerly the site of the National Coal Board's regional office, housed the offices of the Higher Education Funding Council for Wales, and the Welsh office of the Camelot Group, operators of the UK National Lottery. In 2018, the Orchards were demolished and McCarthy and Stone built an independent living complex called Llys Faith.

== Shopping and leisure ==
=== Llanishen village ===
Llanishen village is a small local shopping centre offering a range of shops and services to the surrounding community.

Llanishen Library is a full-time branch library.

=== Llanishen and Lisvane Reservoirs ===
The area includes two non-functional reservoirs, Llanishen Reservoir and the smaller, adjoining Lisvane Reservoir. Llanishen Reservoir forms the end of a Victorian water supply system stretching from the Brecon Beacons to Cardiff. It was previously threatened by an American-led commercial development for domestic housing, where the proposed houses would be built around a reduced lake. However, the site was designation by Cadw and as a Site of Special Scientific Interest, making it difficult for the developer to gain building permission. Locals have campaigned to make the area a registered village green.

=== Cardiff Sailing Centre ===
Cardiff Sailing Centre (Llanishen Sailing Centre) is a sailing school teaching sailing, windsurfing and powerboating.

=== Sports facilities ===
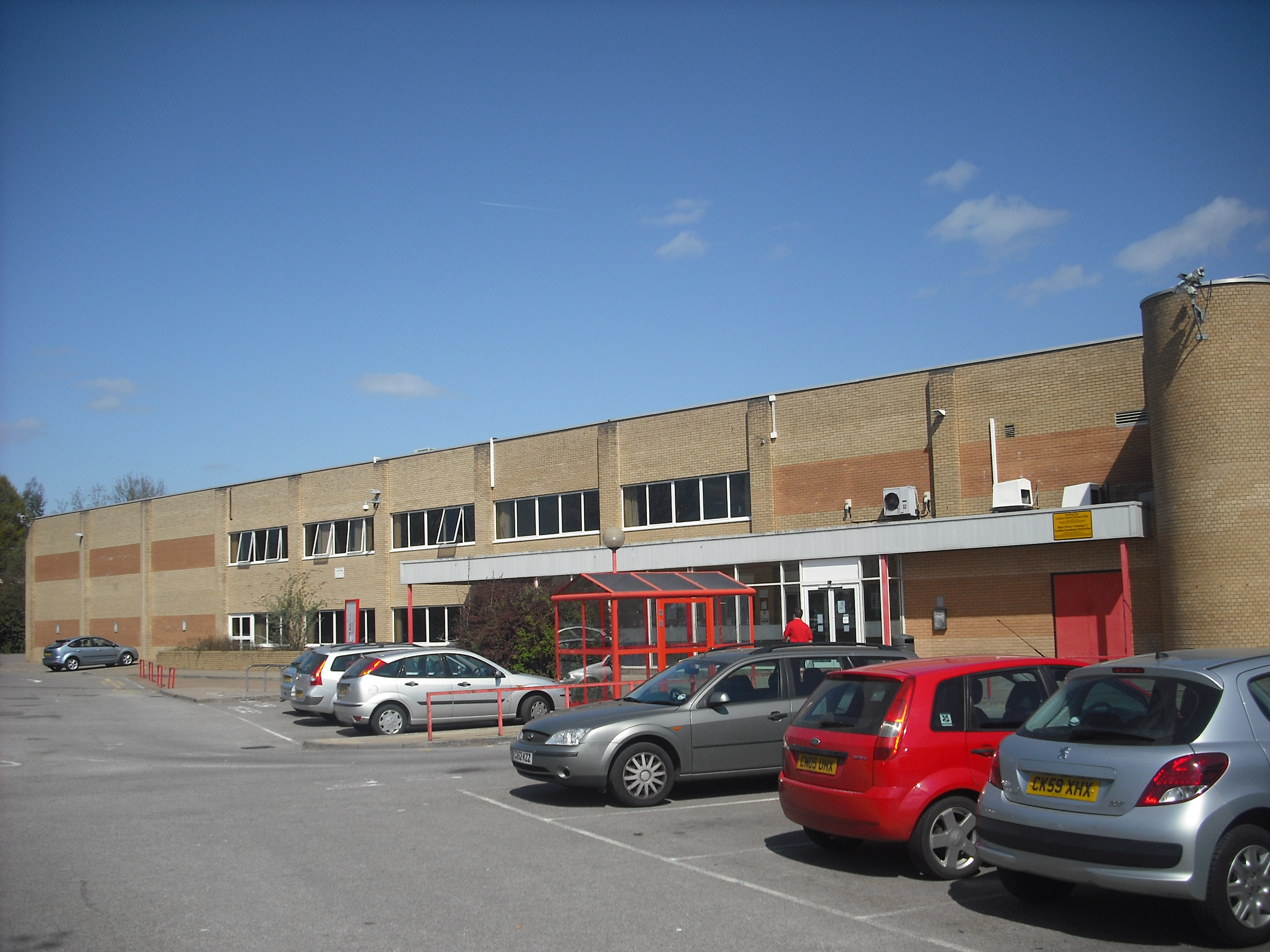
Llanishen Leisure Centre

Llanishen Leisure Centre is situated in Llanishen and is the largest in the city. It has a pool with a wave machine, Squash courts, multi-activity sports hall, gym and cafeteria. It is built in a very similar layout to the leisure centre in Pentwyn.

There is a public skatepark next to the leisure centre, featuring two quarter-pipes, a jump box, two flat banks, a driveway, a spine, a rail, a wallride and a halfpipe. Llanishen is also home to RampWorld Cardiff, which is Wales' largest indoor skatepark and operates as a non-profit making charity to provide indoor extreme sports training facilities.

Buzz trampoline Park (formerly GoAir) was located on the Ty Glas Business Park in Llanishen before closing in Sunday, September 7, 2025, after nearly 10 years of operation due to landlord redevelopment plans

Llanishen RFC is based in the area and has a 3G rugby ground, built in 2018 as part of a new partnership with Llanishen High School. The club house is off Ty Glas Avenue nearby. The club's former training ground and pitch was located off Usk Road and was sold to a housing developer to fund the new 3G pitch facilities

== Schools ==
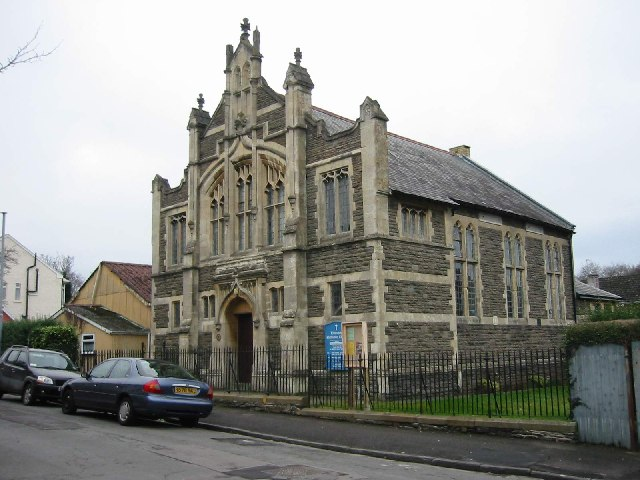
Llanishen Methodist Church

=== Primary schools ===
- Christ the King R.C. Primary School
- Coed Glas
- Ysgol y Wern
- The Court Special School

=== Secondary schools ===
- Llanishen High School – previously known as Heol Hir Boys' School and Heol Hir Girls' School (1960–70s)

== Transport ==
The district is served by two railway stations: Llanishen railway station (on the Cardiff Central to Rhymney Line) in the east and Ty Glas railway station (on the Cardiff Central to Coryton) in the west.

Three bus routes serve Llanishen:

- 27 Thornhill from Cardiff Bus Interchange operated by Cardiff Bus
- 28 from Station Road (Thornhill) Through Roath Park to Cardiff Bus Interchange – operated by Cardiff Bus
- 86 (Lisvane) – operated by Cardiff Bus

== Government and politics ==
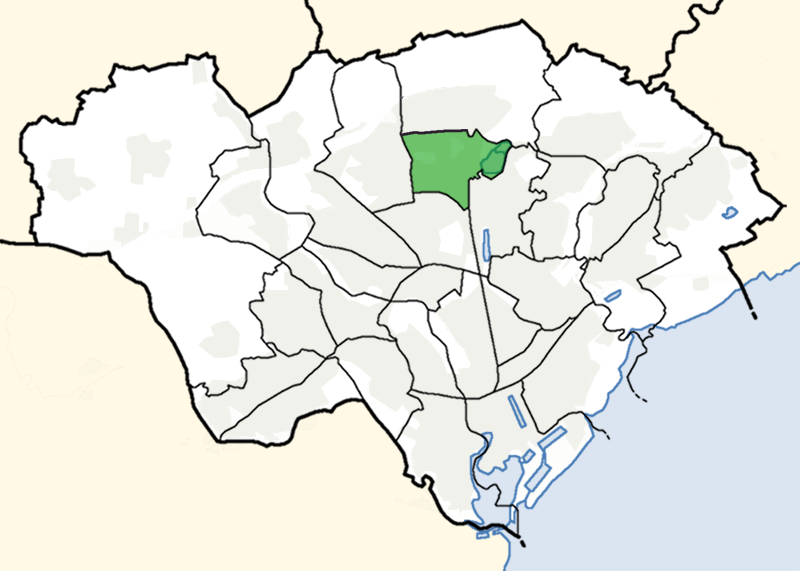
Llanishen electoral ward in Cardiff

=== Electoral ward ===
Llanishen is part of an electoral ward with Thornhill, and is also a community of the City of Cardiff. There is no community council for the area.

The Llanishen ward falls within the Senedd constituency of Cardiff North and the UK Parliamentary constituency of the same name. It covers some or all of the geographical areas of Llanishen and Thornhill. It is bounded by the wards of Lisvane to the northwest; Cyncoed to the southeast; Heath to the south; and Rhiwbina to the west.

=== Representation ===
- Since 2017, Cardiff North has been represented in the British House of Commons by Anna McMorrin MP (Labour).
- Since 2011, Cardiff North has been represented in the Senedd by Julie Morgan MS (Labour).
- As of December 2022, Llanishen is represented on Cardiff Council by Councillors Gerry Hunt and Bethan Proctor (both Labour).

== Notable people ==
The 16th-century Welsh bard Meurig Dafydd was born in Llanishen. The film director Richard Marquand (Jagged Edge, Return of the Jedi) was born in Llanishen. His father was Labour MP Hilary Marquand. Footballer Joe Jacobson was born and raised in Llanishen. Radio presenter Polly James grew up in the area.

== See also ==
- St Isan's Church
