= St Isan's Church =

Church in Cardiff, Wales

St Isan's, Llanishen
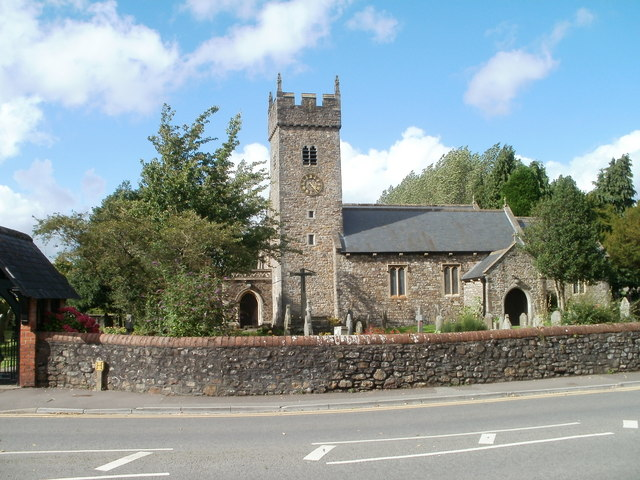
- St Isan's in 2010
- St Isan's, Llanishen
- 51.5294°N 3.1888°W
- Denomination: Anglican

History
- Status: Active
- Founded: c. 12th Century
- Dedication: Saint Isan

Architecture
- Heritage designation: Grade II*
- Designated: 12 February 1952

Specifications
- Materials: stone

Administration
- Diocese: Llandaff
- Parish: Llanishen

St Isan's Church is a listed Anglican church in the suburb of Llanishen, Cardiff. The church's origins are medieval, though the present building was extensively remodeled during the Victorian and Edwardian years.

== Early history ==
Saint Isan and his companion Saint Edeyrn are believed to have been active in the area in the 6th century, after having been sent by St Teilo to establish religious settlements. Isan reached what is now Llanishen in 535 or 537 AD, and established a 'llan' (enclosure) at the site. This would have consisted of a primitive structure which served as both a church and as accommodation for visitors. The llan would have also included a farming plots and would have been surrounded by a palisade. Isan died in 537 AD, so his time in the district would have been fleeting, but had significant effect. As the Celtic church was still using Latin as its language, Isan also used the name Dionysius. As local people did not use or understand Latin, this name was corrupted to Dennis or Denys, and was later applied to St Denys' Church in Lisvane. An associate of Isan's was St Edeyrn, from whom the name Llanedeyrn is derived, and who also has a church dedicated to him in Llanedeyrn.

The first mention of a proper church at the location dates from the 12th century, at which time it was a chapel of ease to St Mary's Church in what was then the separate and fairly distant town of Cardiff, which would not absorb Llanishen until the late 19th century. The church consisted of a nave, chancel, a tower and a porch. A sanctuary, chancel and north and south windows were added in the 14th century. The tower was added in the 15th century. It, together with the medieval nave, survive, along with a small portion of the south chancel wall which is thought to be the oldest surviving part of the church.

== Later extensions and further history ==
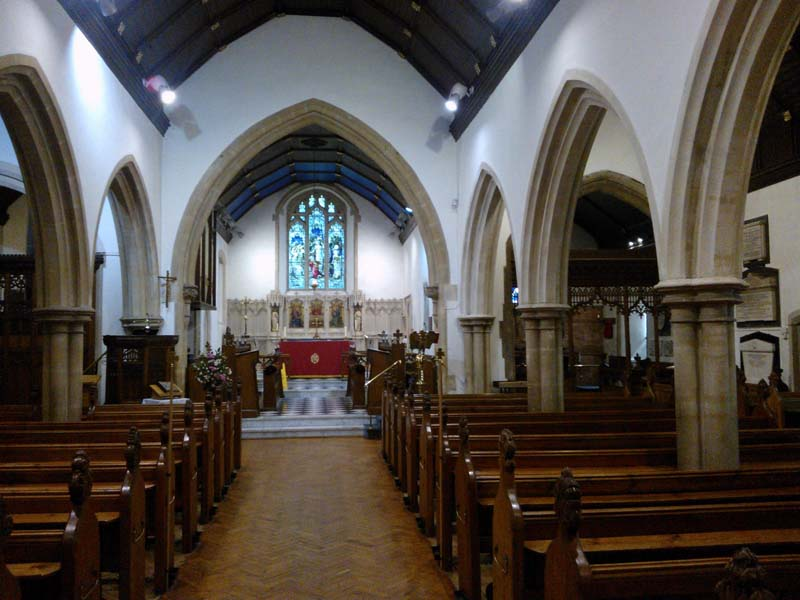
Interior looking east towards the chancel

The first enlargement occurred in 1854 when Prichard and Seddon added a north aisle and an arcade. After the opening of the Rhymney Railway, Llanishen's population began to grow as the village began to transform into a suburb. The 1854 aisle was demolished and replaced by H.D. Blessley in 1907–8, a new nave and chancel also being added, together with a second (south) arcade which matched the style of the 1854 arcade. A vestry was added in 1927. The church gained listed status in 1952. In 1993, the Llanishen Local History Society planted a tree at the site of St Isan's original llan.

== St Faith's Church, Llanishen ==
The sister church of St Isan's is St Faith's on Morris Avenue. It was built in the 1960s to serve the area's growing population of the postwar years.
