= Parkminster United Reformed Church, Roath =

Church in Cardiff, Wales

Parkminster United Reformed Church
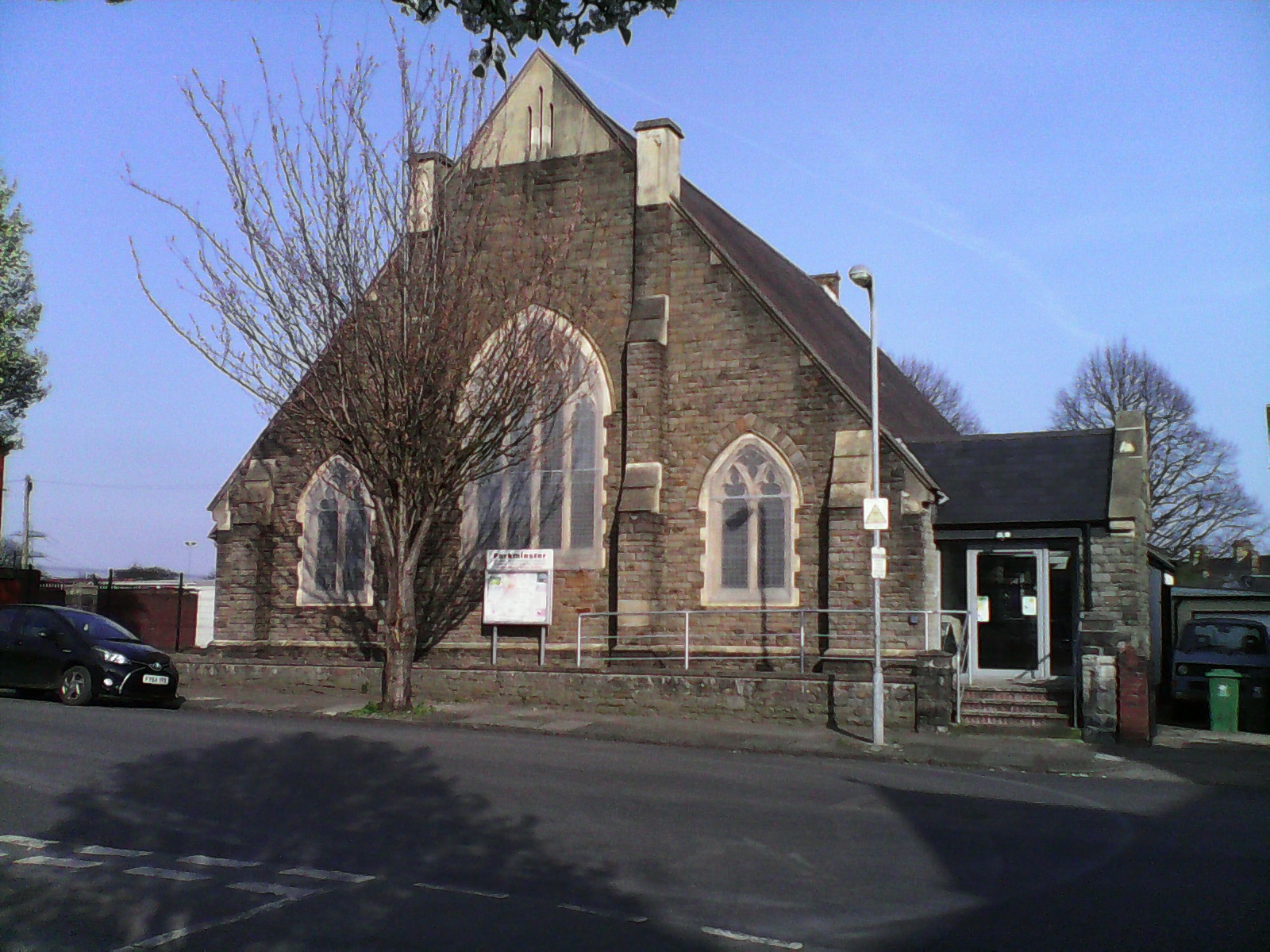
- The church in 2017.
- Parkminster United Reformed Church
- 51.4919°N 3.1519°W
- Denomination: United Reformed
- Previous denomination: Congregationalist
- Website: www.parkminster.roath.org.uk

History
- Former name: Minster Road Congregational Church / Minster Road United Reformed Church
- Status: Active
- Founded: 1927
- Founder: Star Street Congregational Church

Parkminster United Reformed Church is located in Roath, Cardiff.

== History ==
Star Street Congregational Church was opened in 1871, in Adamsdown. It was plagued with monetary problems and financial issues in its early years, leading to a group splitting from the church and setting up in Stacey Road. Despite the difficult start, the church prospered in the 1880s, and received a renovation in the 1890s. It kept up a strenuous social calendar, with musical events, reading groups and a Boys' Brigade. The breakaway group disbanded in 1916. The Congregationalists first began operating in Minster Road in 1927, intending to build a new church, with a hall beside it. Only the hall was built, becoming Minster Road Congregational Church after the plans for two buildings were abandoned. In 1972, it became Minster Road United Reformed Church when the Presbyterian and Congregational churches amalgamated.

Minster Road's mother church in Star Street thrived until the 1970s. It eventually closed in 1985 and is now a Gurdwara. After its closure, its congregation was absorbed by Minster Road URC. In 1996, Minster Road URC became a joint pastorate with Roath Park URC on Pen-y-wain Road. The churches eventually merged in 2008, and the Pen-y-wain road property was sold to a splinter group from Heath Evangelical Church in 2009. After the merge, Minster Road URC became Parkminster URC, combining the two names.

The church was extensively renovated in 2012.

== Activities ==
The church is also used by the Calvary Church of God in Christ, which meets there on Sunday afternoons.
