= St Patrick's Roman Catholic Church, Grangetown =

St Patrick's Roman Catholic Church
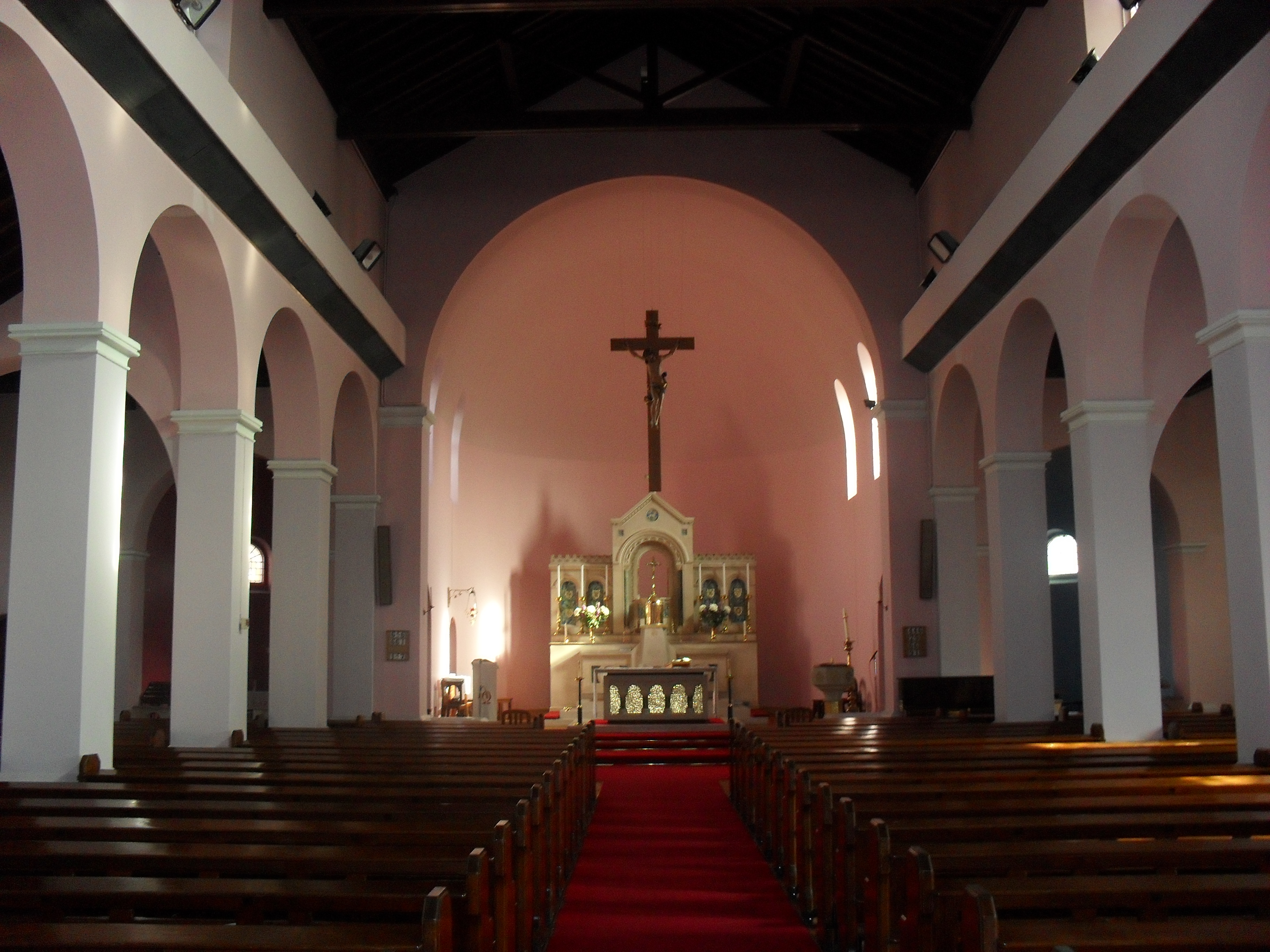
- St Patrick's Roman Catholic Church
- 51°28′01.92″N 3°11′01.85″W
- Location: Grangetown, Cardiff
- Country: Wales
- Denomination: Roman Catholic
- Churchmanship: High English
- Website: Church Website

History
- Status: Active
- Founded: 1882
- Events: See Events

Architecture
- Functional status: Active
- Heritage designation: Welsh
- Architect: James Goldie
- Completed: 1930

Specifications
- Capacity: Around 450.

Administration
- Division: Part of St Mary's, Canton
- Province: Cardiff-Menevia
- Diocese: Cardiff-Menevia
- Deanery: Cardiff
- Parish: St. Patrick's

Clergy
- Priest: Canon Michael Patrick Evans

St Patrick's Roman Catholic Church in Grangetown, Cardiff, is part of the Cardiff West Deanery of the Roman Catholic Archdiocese of Cardiff-Menevia. It opened on St Patrick's Day 1930.

== History ==
There has been a St Patrick's Church in Grangetown since 1882, adjacent to St Patrick's School. A Memorial Hall was built in 1921. Plans were set in motion in 1928 to build a new church, on the site of allotments of two parishioners. The foundation stone was laid on St Patrick's Day 1929 and the church was opened exactly one year later.

== Activities ==
- Parish coach trips to places around Britain take place throughout the year.
- The parish make an annual pilgrimage to Lourdes.
- Parish Council meetings take place every quarter.

=== Church groups and ministries ===
- Society of Saint Vincent de Paul meet every other week on Friday at 18:30hrs in the presbytery.
- Guild of St. Stephen (Altar Servers)
- Ministers of the Word
- Extraordinary Ministers of Holy Communion
- Children's Liturgy
- Parish Council
- Parish Advisory Council
- Union of Catholic Mothers
- Rite of Christian Initiation of Adults
- Offertory group
- Choir
- Cathechism

== Recent events ==
It has been proposed that the current parish hall in Bishop Street be demolished to make way for a new health centre to serve the whole of Grangetown. It has arisen, however, that this cannot take place due to a group of bats (a protected species in Britain) that live in the roof of the hall. Designs have been made for a new hall to be built next to the church, meaning a removal of the lawn.

Due to the reorganisation of the archdiocese, St. Cuthbert's Parish in the Docks will become part of St. Patrick's. Also, the church became part of the Cardiff Deanery instead of the Cardiff West Deanery. (The new deanery merged both the old Cardiff East and West deaneries.)

Long serving priest, Father John Fahey, died on Christmas Eve in 2008. He was succeeded by Father Bogdan Wera in 2008 – who revived the church with a growing Polish community. Father Bogdan died in September 2017. The church has now been joined by Canon Michael Patrick Evans.

== School ==
St Patrick's R C Primary School in Lucknow Street, Grangetown has close links with the church. A school mass is celebrated once a month in the church and sometimes in school during term times. The school has around 250 pupils aged 4–11 (Reception – Year 6) and around 15 teachers, as well as non-teaching staff including teachers aids and admin. The school feeds to the Catholic high school, Mary Immaculate, in Ely.
