= Cardiff Deanery =

The Cardiff Deanery is a Roman Catholic deanery in the Archdiocese of Cardiff-Menevia, previously in the Archdiocese of Cardiff, that oversees several churches in the city of Cardiff. It replaced the previous Cardiff East Deanery and Cardiff West Deanery, combining the two into one. The dean is centred at the Parish of St Mary's Canton.

== Churches ==
The parishes in the deanery have been split into 'clusters'. These churches are not being merged but will be working together to make sure that all parishioners in the cluster are served sufficiently. As part of the archdiocese reorganisations, various churches were put into the same parish.

- Blessed Sacrament, Rumney
- St Cadoc, Llanrumney
- St John Lloyd, Trowbridge

- St Alban on the Moors, Splott - served by the Cardiff Oratory
- St Joseph, Gabalfa - served by the Rosminians
- St Peter, Roath - served by the Rosminians

- St Brigid, Llanishen
- St Paul, Cyncoed - served from St Brigid
- Christ the King, Llanishen - served from St Brigid

- St Philip Evans, Llanedeyrn
- St Teilo, Whitchurch
- Our Lady of Lourdes, Gabalfa - served from Whitchurch

- St Mary of the Angels, Canton
- Sacred Heart, Leckwith - served from Canton
- Holy Family, Fairwater - served from Canton

- St Patrick, Grangetown
- St Cuthbert, Cardiff Docks - utilised by the Ukrainian Greek Catholic Church Parish of St Theodore of Tarsus
- St Francis of Assisi, Ely
- St Clare, Ely - served from St Francis of Assisi Church

- St David's Metropolitan Cathedral, Cardiff City Centre
- University Chaplaincy, Cardiff City Centre

- St Helen, Barry
- St Joseph, Penarth
- St Mary, Dinas Powys - served from Penarth

== Gallery ==
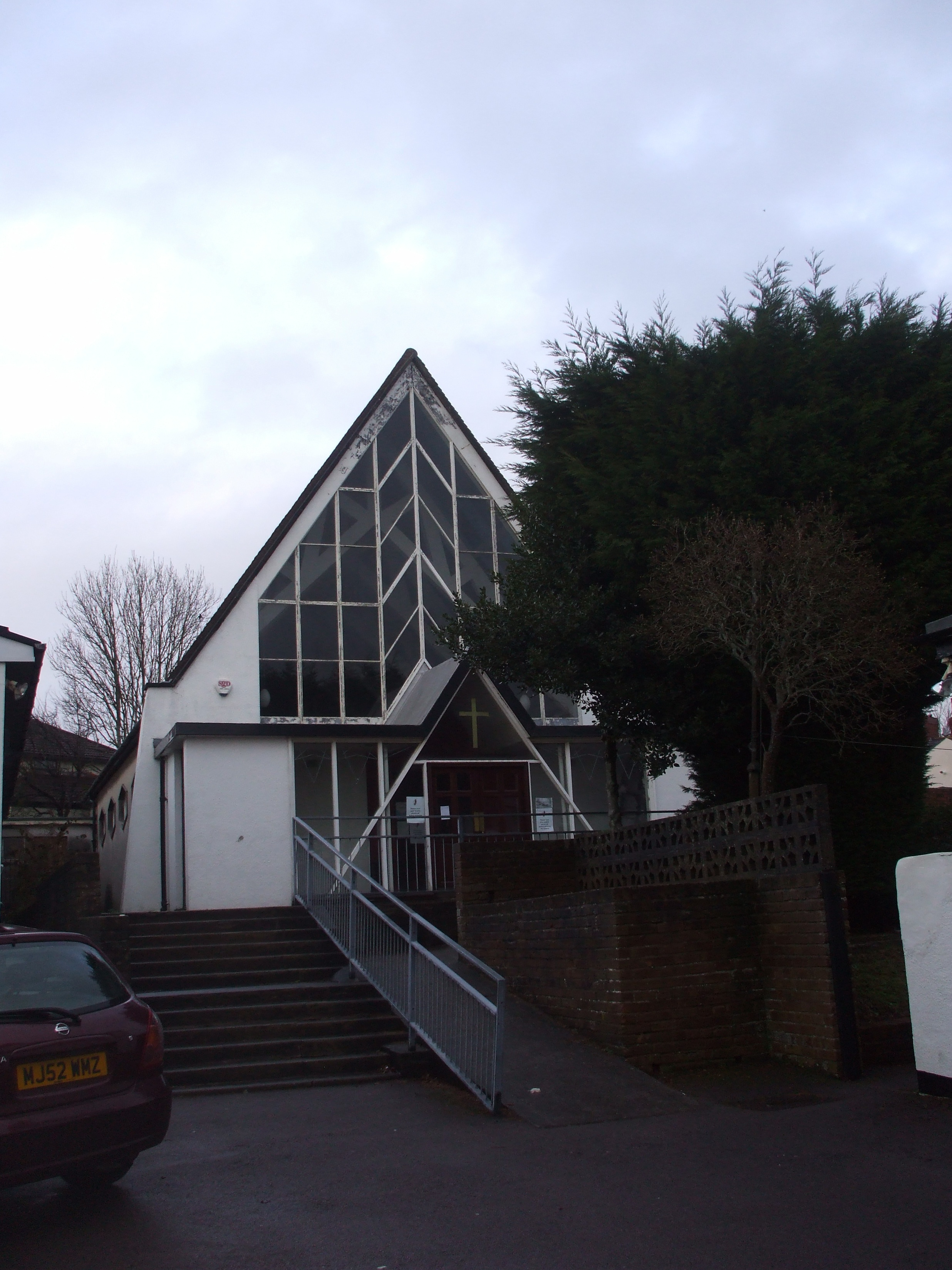
Blessed Sacrament, Rumney

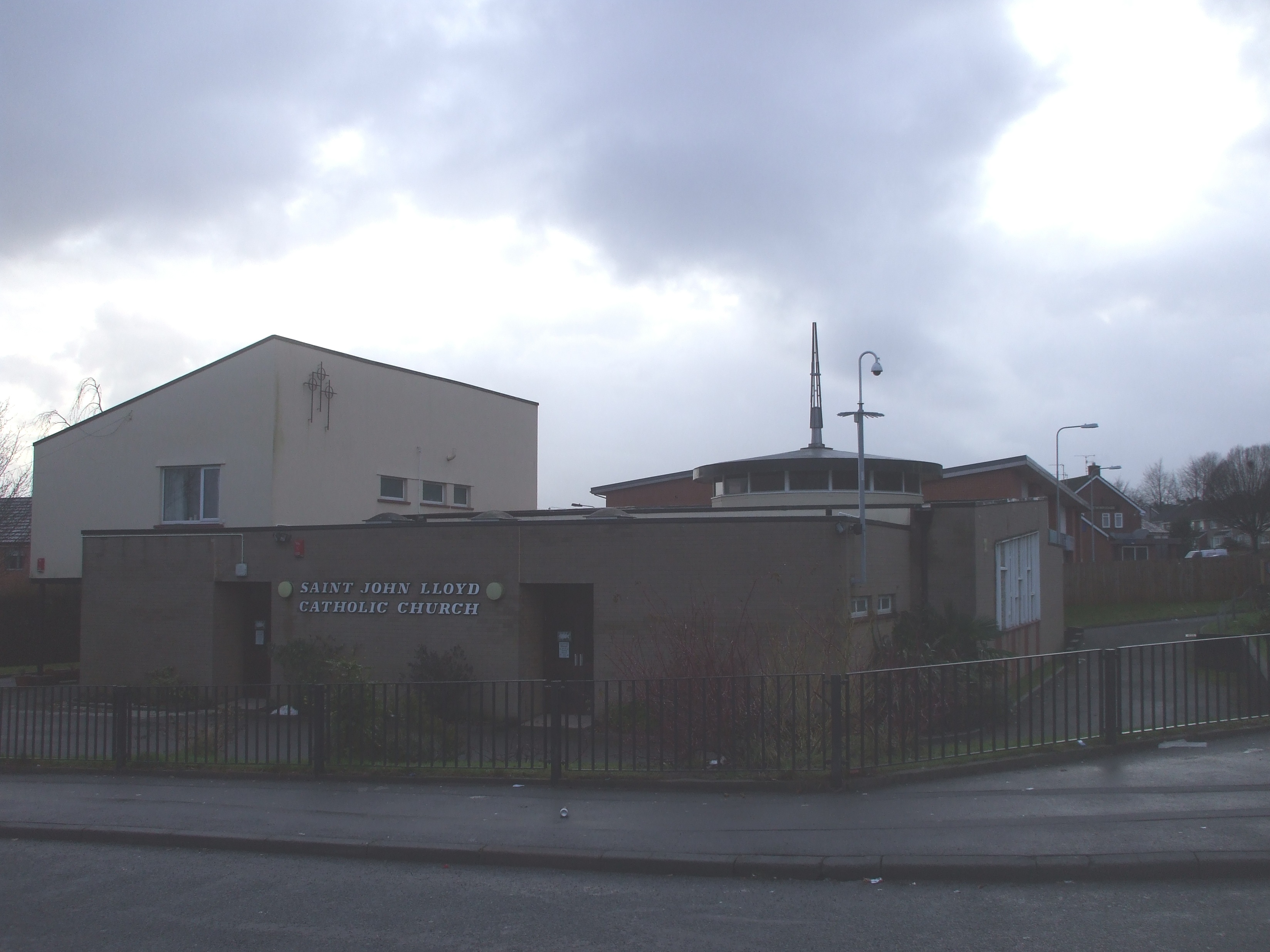
St John Lloyd's, Trowbridge

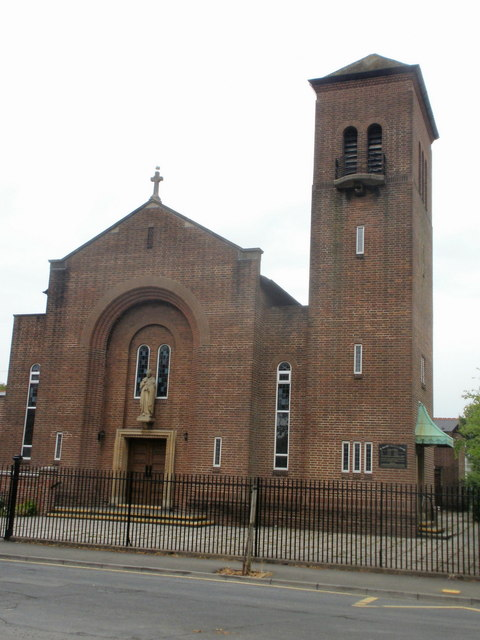
St Joseph's, Gabalfa

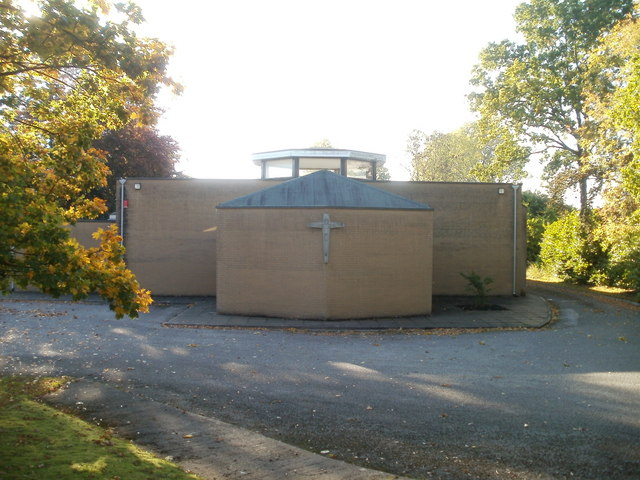
St Paul's, Cyncoed

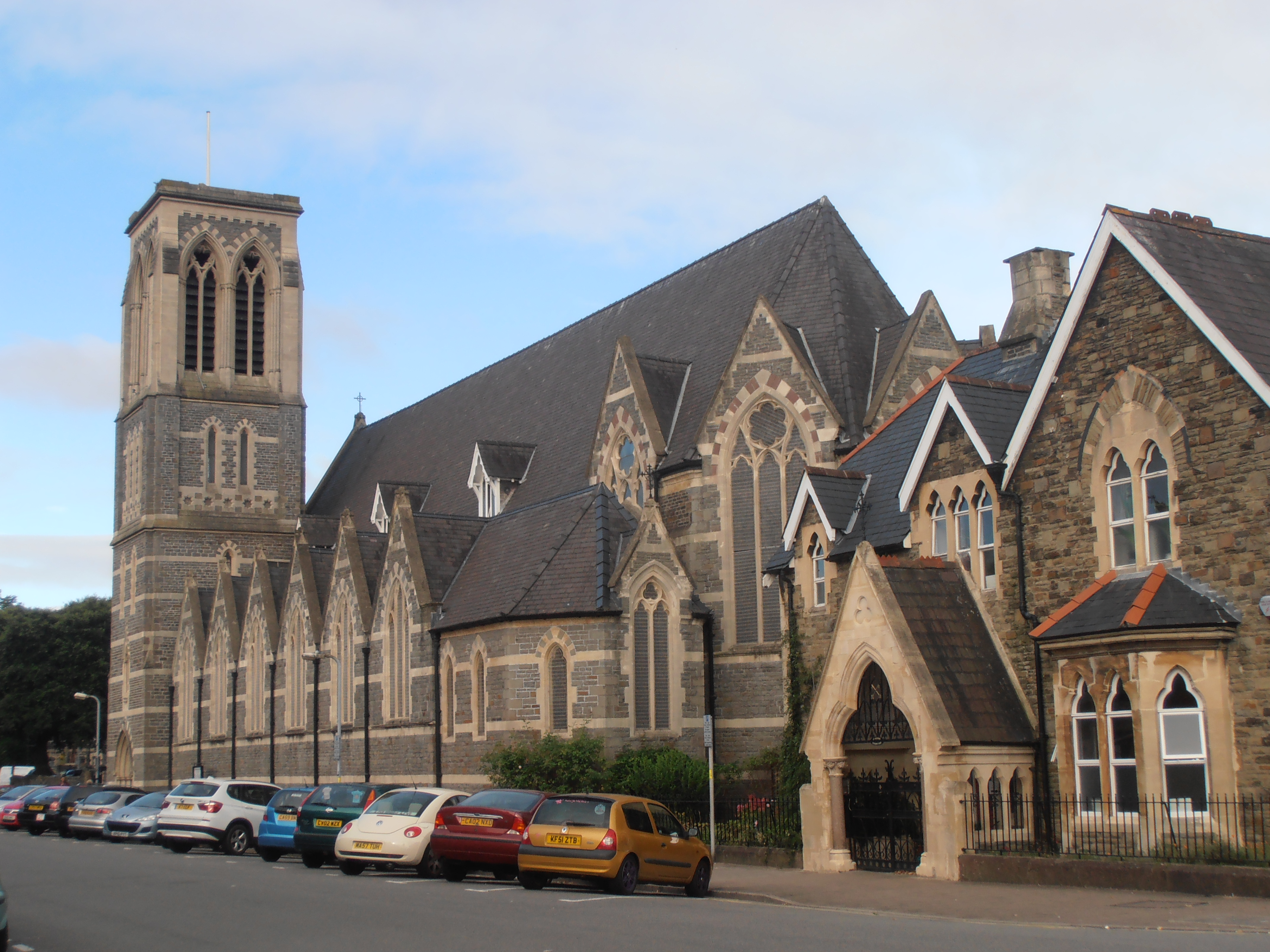
St Peter's, Roath

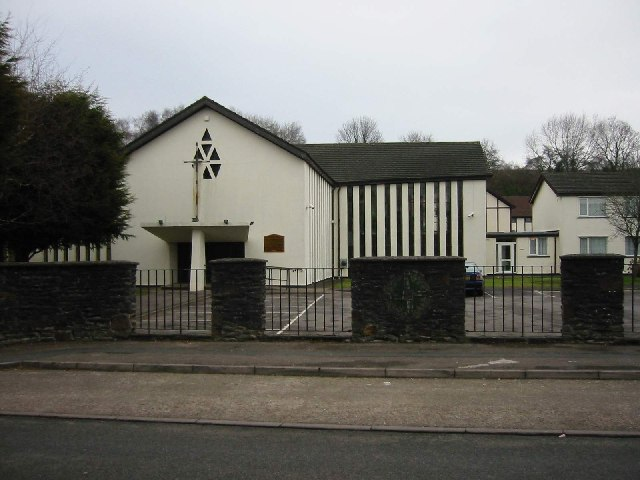
St Brigid's, Llanishen

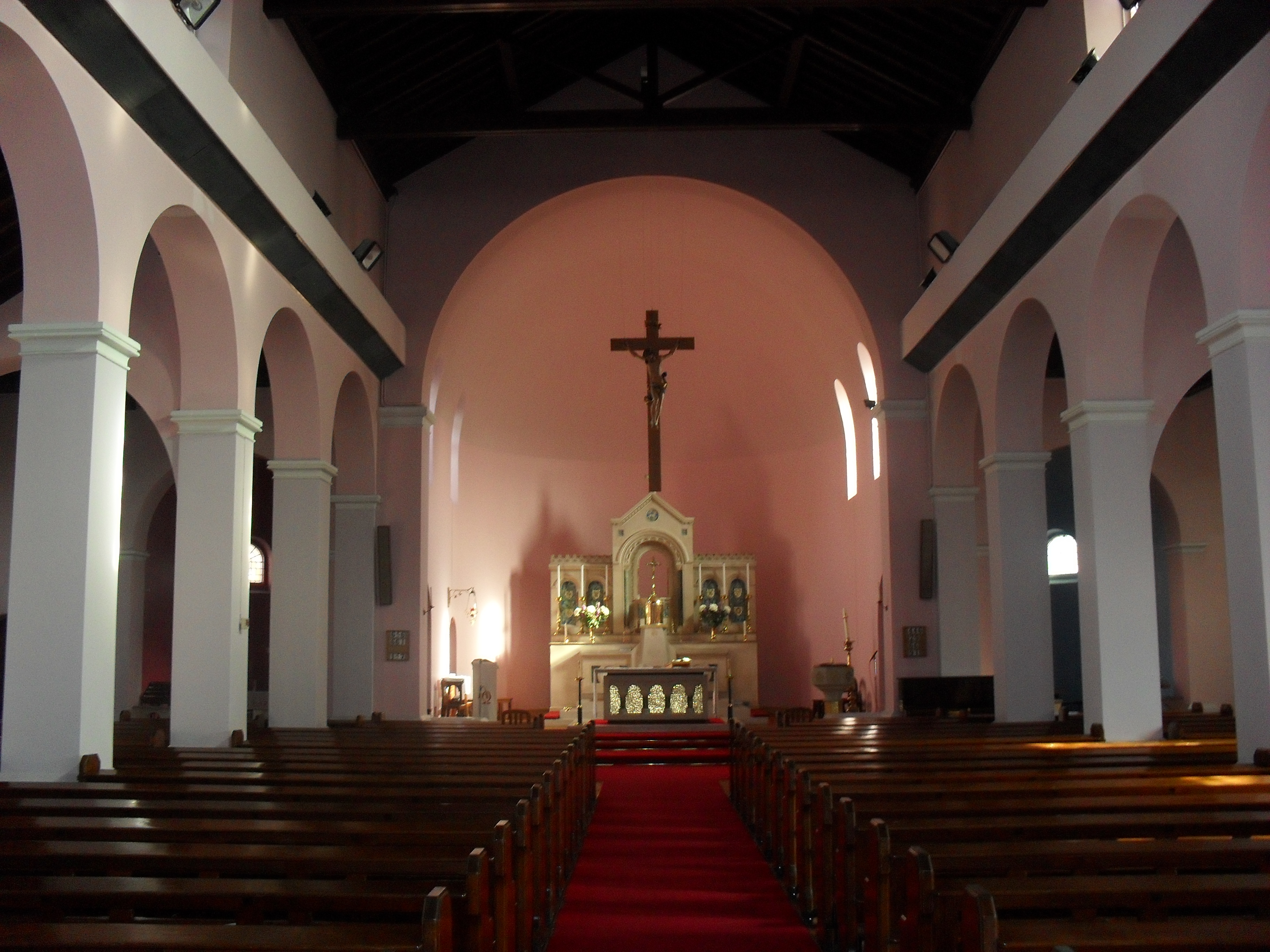
St Patrick's Church interior, Grangetown

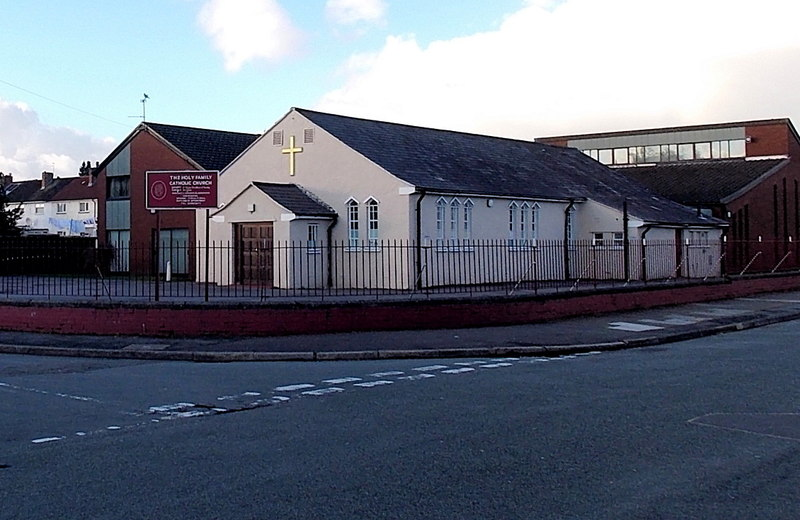
Holy Family, Fairwater

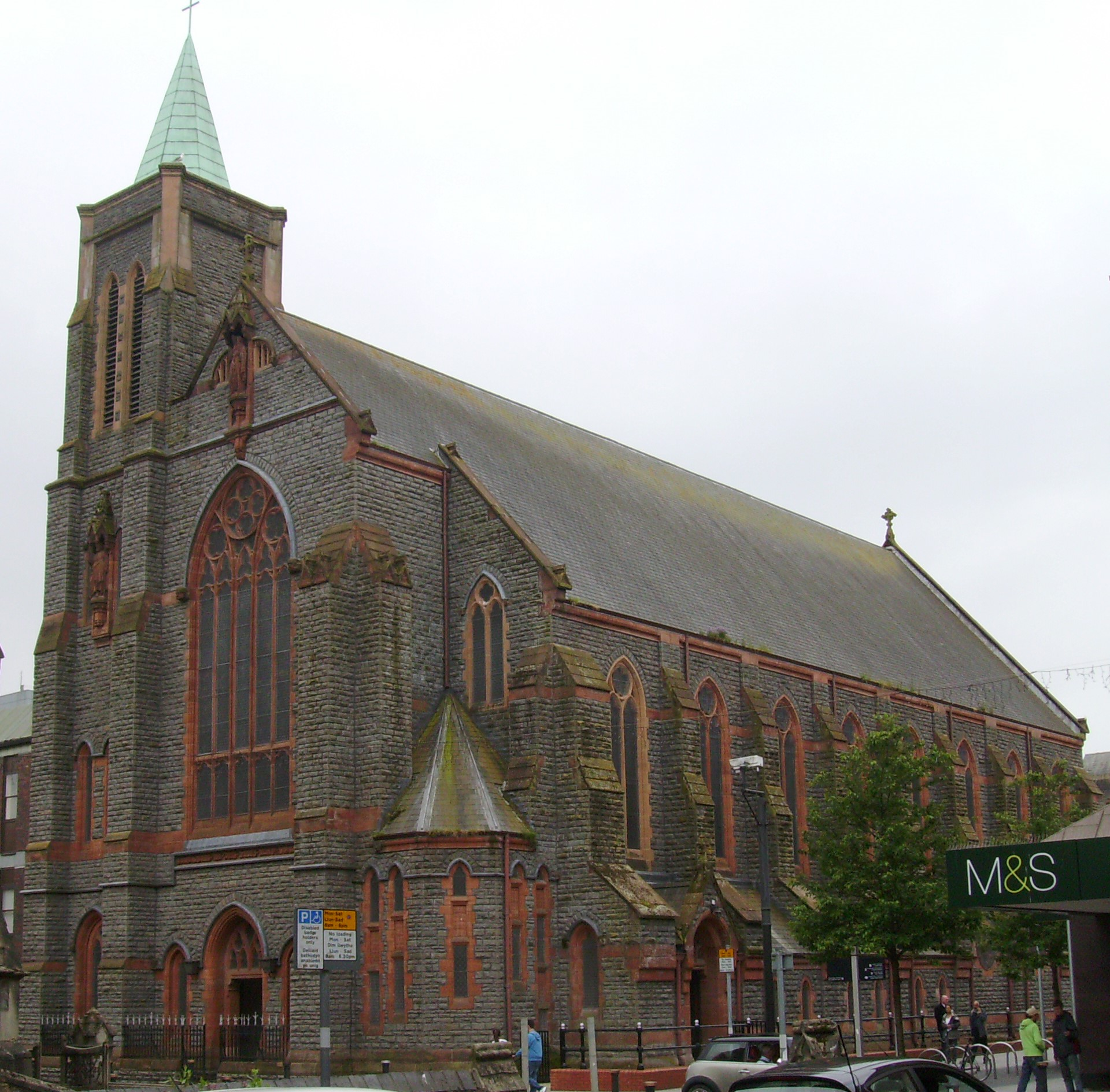
St David's Cathedral

St Helen's, Barry

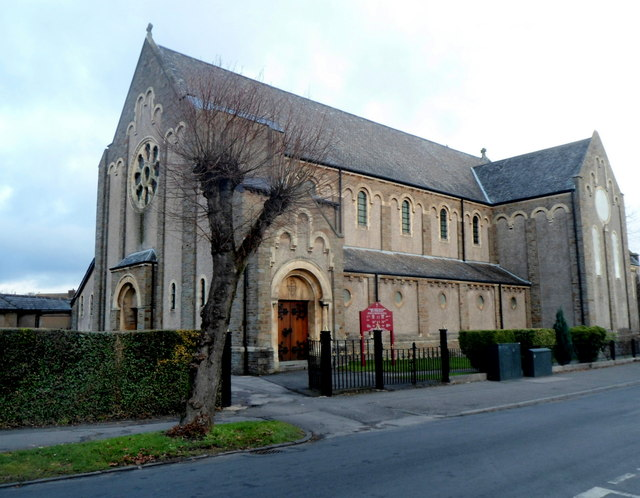
St Joseph's, Penarth
