= St Joseph's Church, Cardiff =

St Joseph's Church
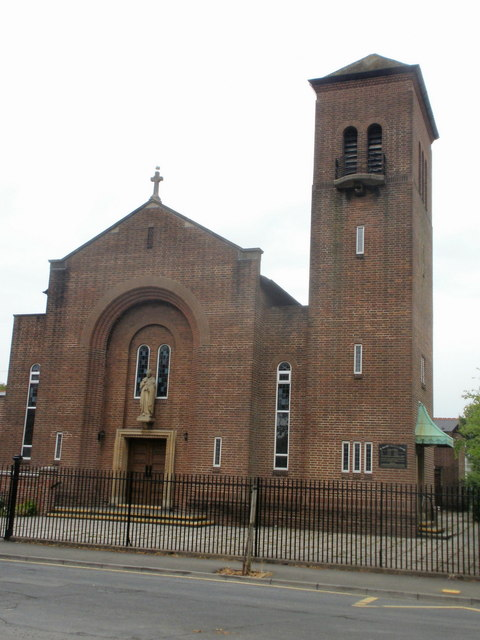
- The west end of the church, as viewed from New Zealand Road.
- St Joseph's Church
- 51.5010°N 3.1892°W
- Location: Gabalfa, Cardiff
- Country: Wales
- Language: English
- Denomination: Roman Catholic
- Religious institute: Rosminians
- Website: Parish Website

History
- Status: Active
- Dedication: Saint Joseph

Architecture
- Architect: F. R. Bates
- Style: Round-arched style
- Years built: 1934–1936
- Groundbreaking: 1934
- Completed: 28 October 1936
- Construction cost: £11,000

Specifications
- Materials: Red brick

Administration
- Province: Cardiff-Menevia
- Archdiocese: Cardiff-Menevia
- Deanery: Cardiff Deanery

Clergy
- Priest: Fr Philip Scanlan

St Joseph's Church, is a Roman Catholic church in Cardiff, Wales. It is administered by the Rosminians. It serves the areas of Gabalfa, Cathays, and Maindy.

== History ==
=== Early history ===
The Rosminians arrived in Cardiff in 1854. They first established St Peter's Church, Roath, and St Alban's Church, Splott. The first church building of St Joseph's used parts from an iron church at St Alban's parish, which received a new building in 1911. This opened on shrubland in Gabalfa on 1 June 1913, served by priests from St Peter's parish. In 1921, it became an independent parish, serving around 1,000 Catholics. The presbytery building was completed later, in 1927.

The current church building received funding in 1934 from an £11,000 donation from Thomas Callaghan after the death of his wife Edith. It was designed by the architect F. R. Bates, with rounded arches and red-brown brick construction. This opened on 28 October 1936. It has a baptistery, bell tower, choir loft, and aisled nave.

=== Modern history ===
The interior of St Joseph's Church was changed significantly after the Second Vatican Council. The church hall was added in the late 2000s.

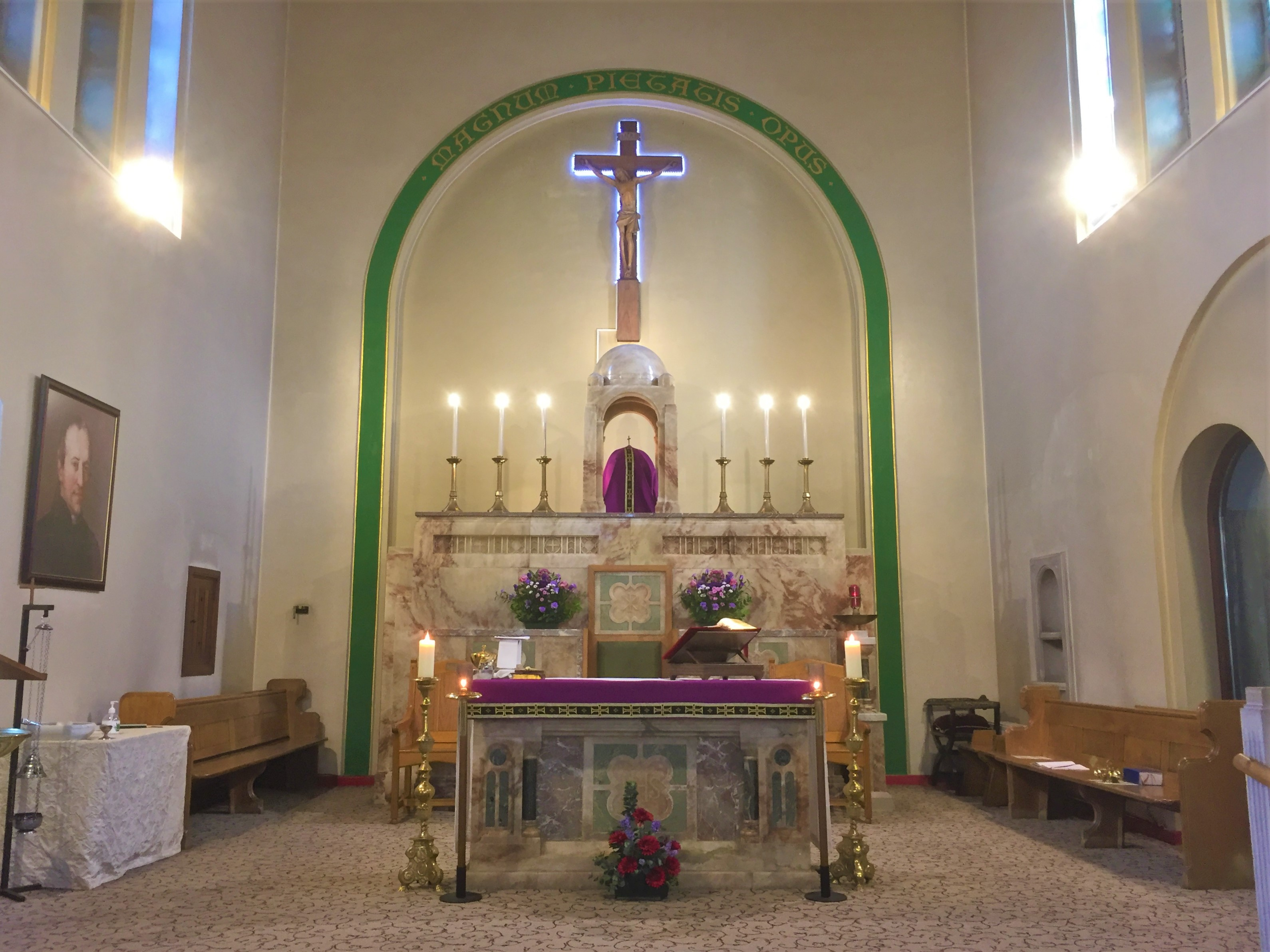
The sanctuary, as viewed from the central aisle

== Music ==
=== Organ ===
The organ at St Joseph's was built in 1947 by Conacher and Co, with six ranks of pipes. This organ remained in the church until 2008, when water damage meant that the organ was scrapped. It was replaced with an electric organ in 2008.

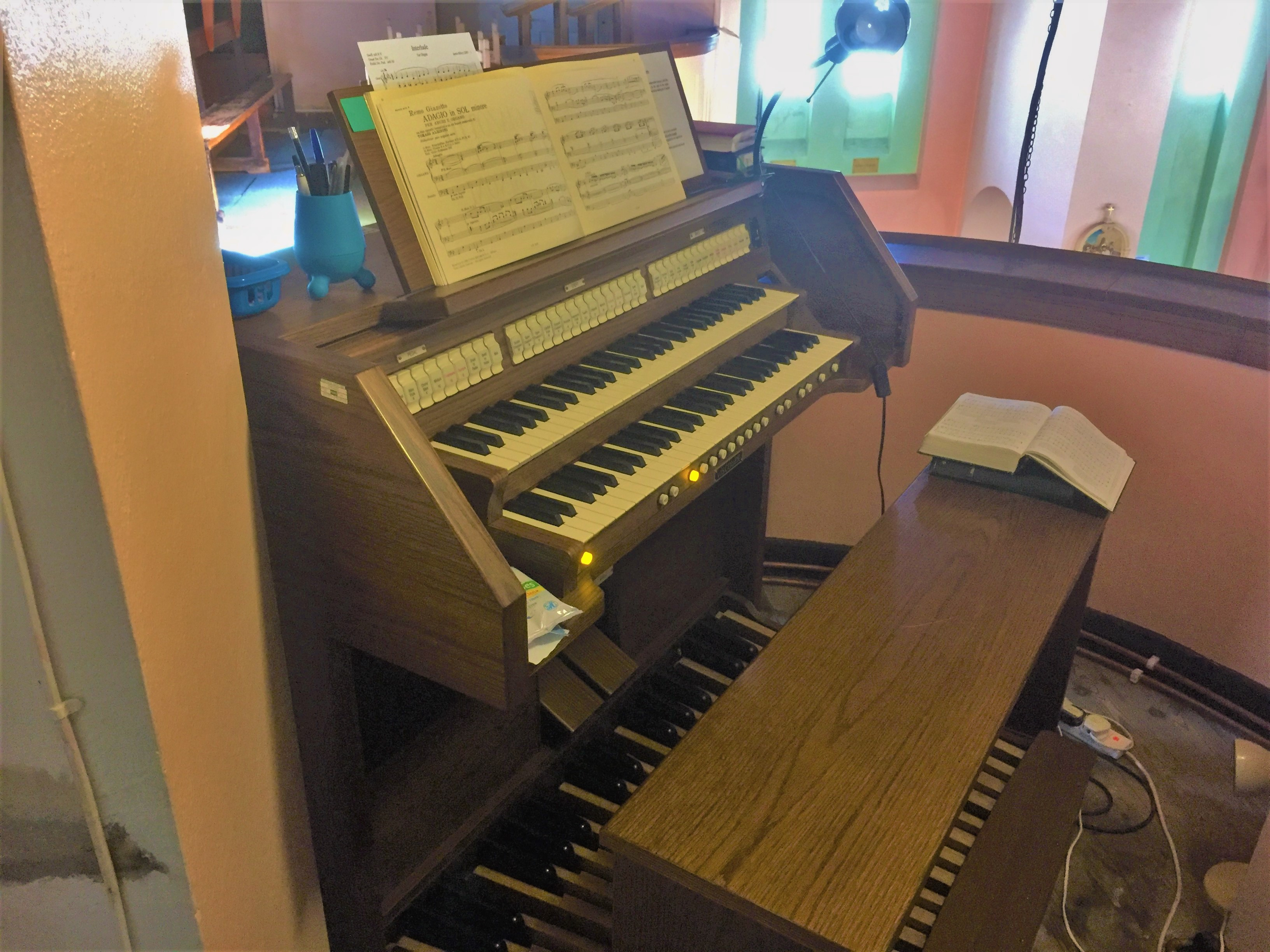
The current Viscount electric organ in the choir loft
