= St Alban-on-the-Moors Church =

Church in Cardiff, Wales

St Alban-on-the-Moors Church, Splott
- The Cardiff Oratory; St Alban's Church, Splott
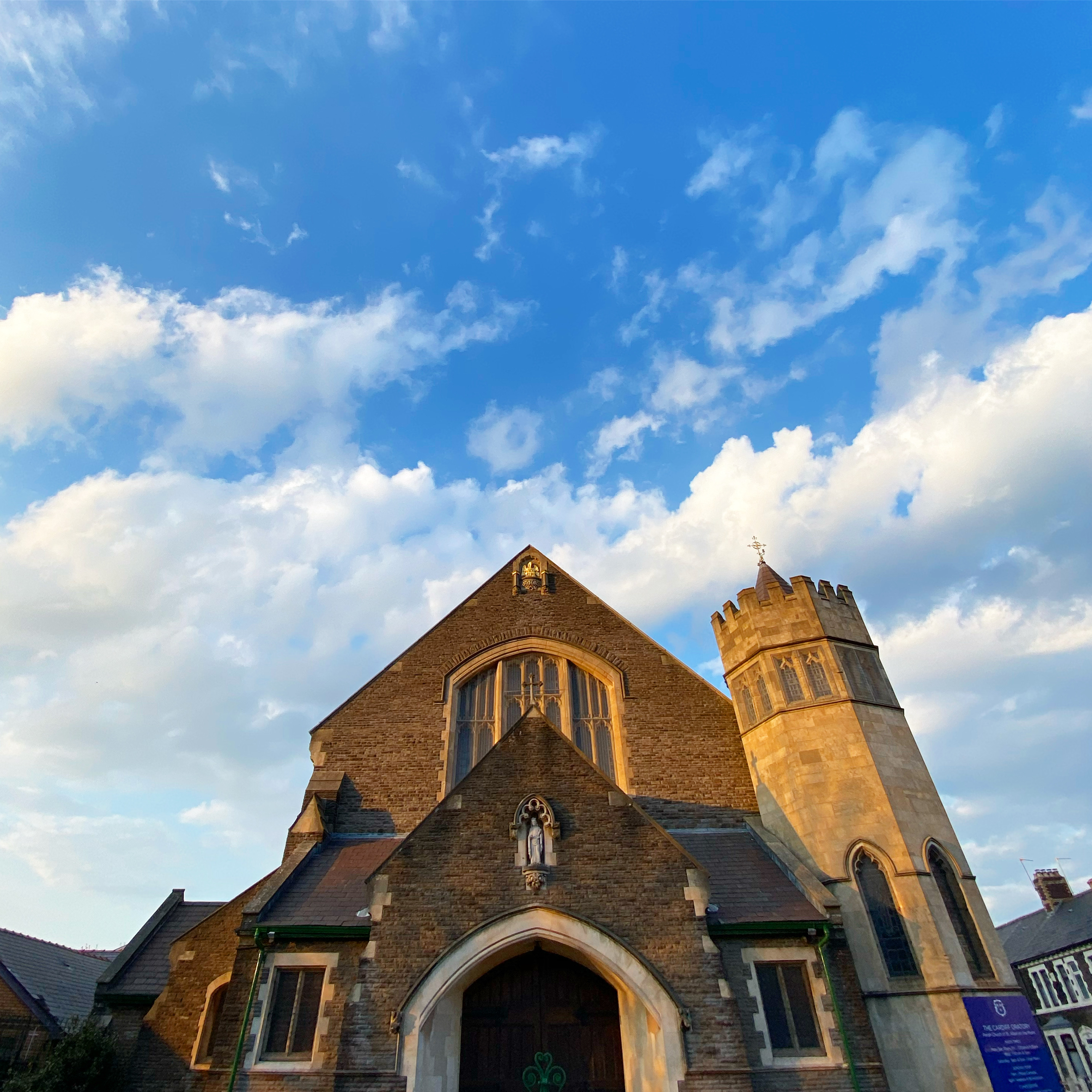
- St Alban-on-the-Moors Church, Splott
- 51°29′10″N 3°8′58″W
- Location: Splott, Cardiff
- Country: Wales
- Language(s): English, Latin
- Denomination: Roman Catholic
- Website: cardifforatory.co.uk

History
- Status: active
- Founded: 1891
- Dedication: Saint Alban
- Consecrated: 16 July 1911

Architecture
- Heritage designation: Grade II listed building
- Architect: F. R. Bates
- Style: Perpendicular Gothic
- Completed: 1911

Specifications
- Materials: Pennant sandstone, Bath stone

Administration
- Province: Cardiff-Menevia
- Archdiocese: Cardiff-Menevia
- Deanery: Cardiff

St Alban-on-the-Moors Church, Splott, also known simply as The Cardiff Oratory or St Alban's Church, is a Roman Catholic church in Splott, Cardiff, Wales. Since 2019, the church is administered by the Fathers and Brothers of the Cardiff Oratory.

== History ==
=== Original building ===
The initial church was an iron church finished in 1891, with parts from other churches (including Cardiff Metropolitan Cathedral and St Peter's Church). This was rebuilt as St Joseph's Church in Gabalfa when the new St Alban's building was finished.

=== Current building ===
The current building was designed by the Newport architect F. R. Bates. The presbytery was completed later.

St Alban's became a Grade II listed building in 1997.

=== Cardiff Oratory ===
In May 2019, the Archbishop of Cardiff transferred the administration of the church and its parish from the Rosminians to the Cardiff Oratory. The priests there moved to St Peter's and St Joseph's, the two other Rosminian parishes in Cardiff.

Since the Oratorians' arrival, the church has seen extensive restoration works, commensurate with the increase in attendance at Masses and other liturgies. The Oratorians have expanded the available Masses and devotions offered at the church.

In May 2020, a wedding was held during a national COVID-19 pandemic lockdown, allegedly against Welsh Government guidance. It was also reported that the wedding was illegal because the required notice had not been given. In the end, no citations or other action were taken by police in response to allegations of violating government guidance.

In June 2021, in conjunction with the parish's patronal feast day, the Oratorians arranged for a first-class relic of St. Alban to be solemnly enshrined in the church by the Abbot of Farnborough.

== Architecture ==
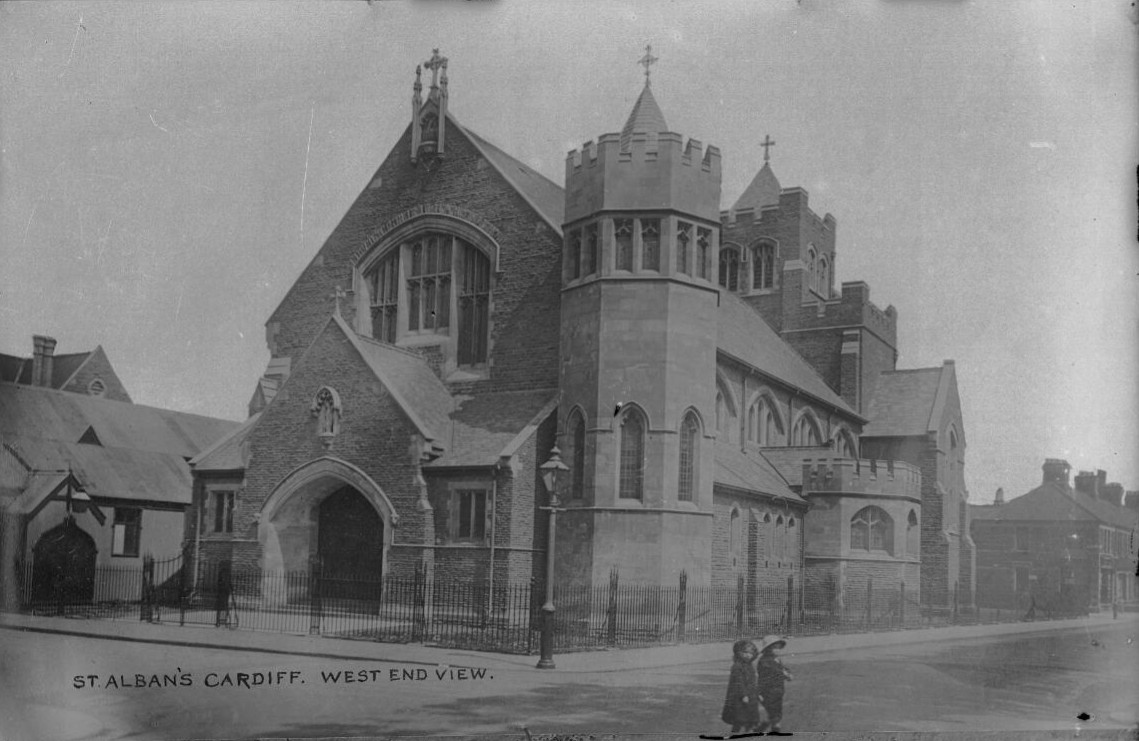
The church after its opening in 1911

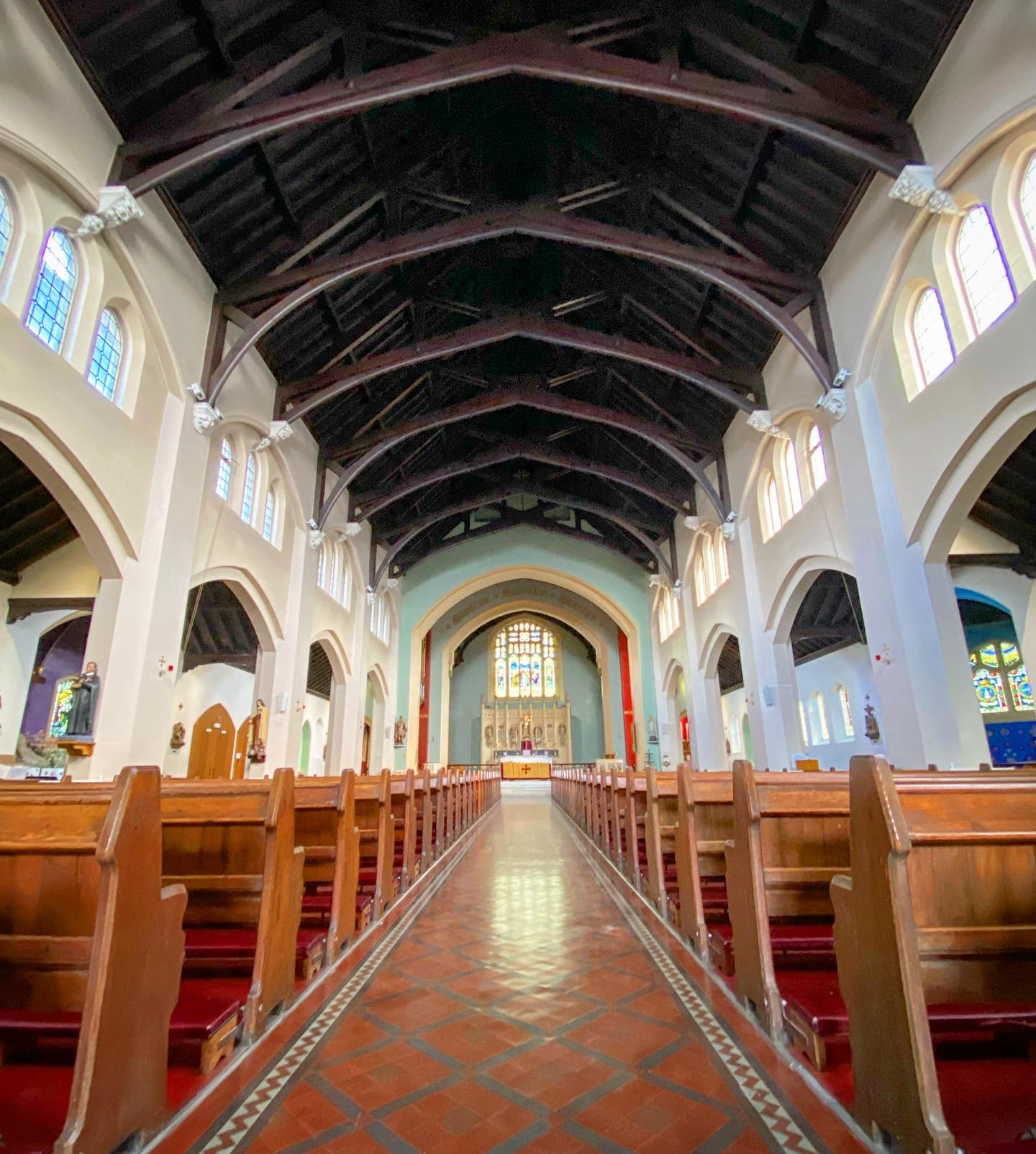
Looking east in the nave of the church

The church is built in the Perpendicular Gothic style, using Pennant sandstone and Bath stone. Its towers are unusual, having both a central rectangular tower and a west octagonal tower. Construction was finished in 1911. The new building was officially opened on 16 July 1911.

== Liturgy ==
In addition to the Usus Recentior form of the Mass, the Oratorians offer regular celebrations of the Usus Antiquior and the Ordinariate Use. Sung and solemn celebrations of the Divine Office are offered on every Sunday and solemnity. The Benediction of the Blessed Sacrament is celebrated six days each week, with a weekly High Mass on Sundays in English and in Latin.
