= St Mary of the Angels Roman Catholic Church, Canton =

Church in Cardiff, Wales

St Mary of the Angels Roman Catholic Church
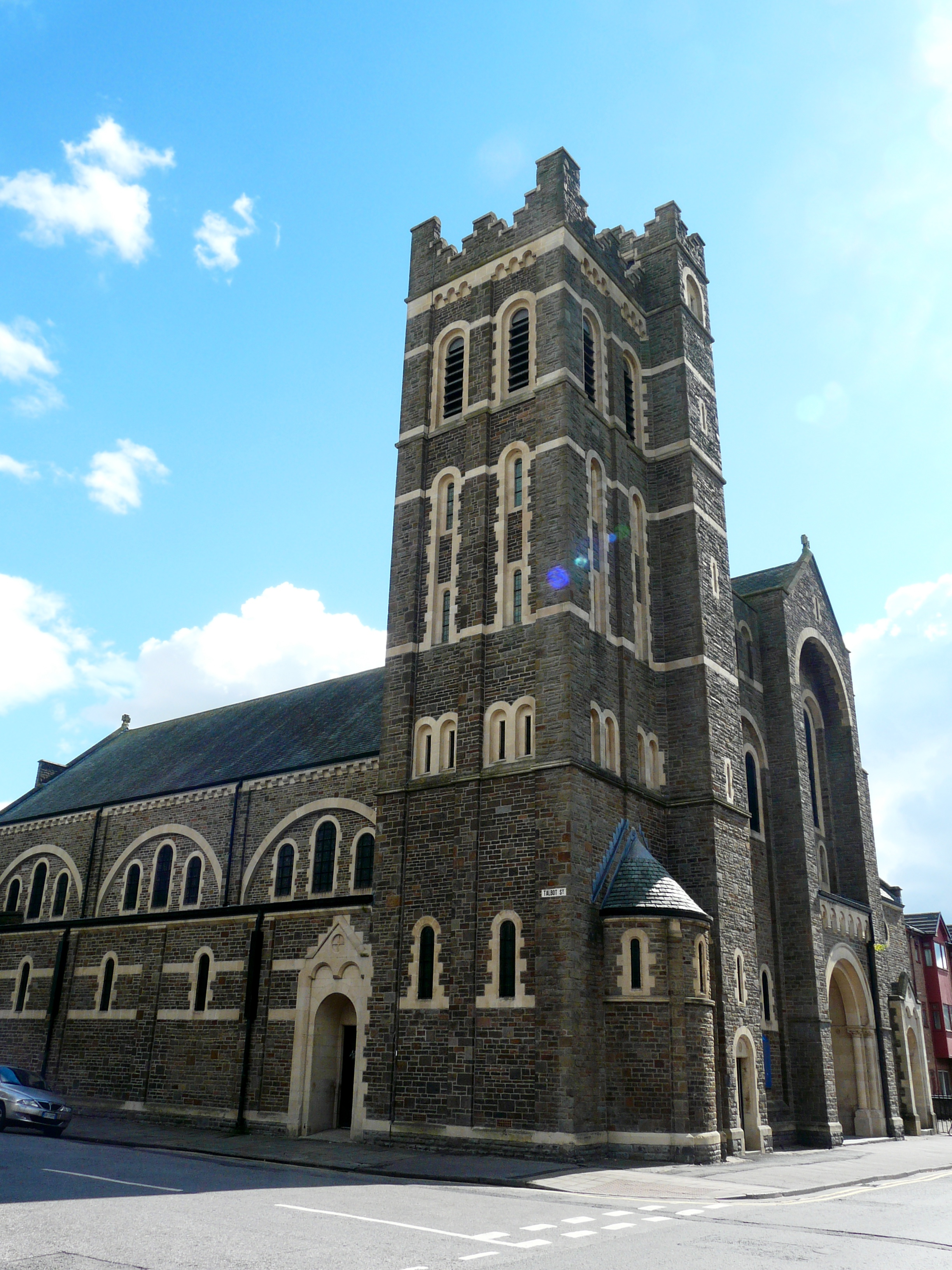
- St Mary of the Angels Roman Catholic Church
- 51°28′58.83″N 3°11′47.26″W
- Location: Canton, Cardiff
- Country: Wales
- Denomination: Roman Catholic
- Website: Church Website

History
- Status: Active
- Founded: 1907
- Consecrated: 30 October 1907

Architecture
- Functional status: Active
- Heritage designation: Grade II
- Architect: Frederick Walters
- Style: Romanesque
- Completed: 1907

Administration
- Province: Cardiff-Menevia
- Archdiocese: Cardiff-Menevia
- Deanery: Cardiff

Clergy
- Priest(s): TBA

St Mary of the Angels Roman Catholic Church (Welsh: Llanfair Yr Angylion) is located in Canton, Cardiff. It is part of the Roman Catholic Archdiocese of Cardiff-Menevia. It opened on 3 November 1907.

The new parish priest is due to be appointed in 2025/2026

== Church history ==
The church was designed by architect Frederick Walters and built by W. T. Morgan. The foundation stone of the church was laid on 20 January 1907 by Bishop Hedley and later that year, on 30 October, the altar was consecrated before the church opened on 3 December. The tower was added in 1916. The church is built using roughly dressed Pennant sandstone and cut Bath stone ashlar dressings, in a late 12th-century French style.

In January 1941, the sacristies and St Ann's Chapel in the church were destroyed by an air raid to be rebuilt 10 years later.

In 1952, the church was temporarily closed to repaint and clean the church as well as to install new lighting and amplifiers. The church was repainted again in 1962.

It became a listed building in 1975, as a building of quality by a noted ecclesiastical architect.

In 1991 the church came under the care of the Archdiocese of Cardiff after many years under the Benedictine community.

On 11 October 2022, it was announced that the parish priest, Canon Peter Collins, was to be the new Bishop of East Anglia, in succession to Bishop Alan Hopes. He was ordained bishop and installed as the fifth Bishop of East Anglia at St John the Baptist Cathedral in Norwich on 14 December 2022.

In January 2023, Archbishop Mark O'Toole appointed Rev. Canon David Hayman, the Chancellor of the Archdiocese of Cardiff, and parish priest of Pontypool, as the new parish priest. A priest in charge was in place from Easter 2023 whilst the parish was without their Parish Priest. In December 2025, Canon Hayman was announced to be replaced by Canon Benedict Koledoye in February 2026.

The church underwent an internal reordering in 2000.

The parish has taken responsibility for the parish records of Sacred Heart, Leckwith, Cardiff.

== Schools ==
The church is closely linked to St Mary's R C Primary School in Canton, and to Mary Immaculate High School in Wenvoe.

Catholic higher education for ages 16 to 18 is provided by St David's Catholic College in Penylan, supported by the church.

== In the news ==
The babies of Charlotte Church and Gavin Henson were baptised at St Mary of the Angels church. Ruby Henson was baptised on 28 June 2008 by Fr. Delaney OSB, who Church described as her favourite priest. Their son Dexter Lloyd Henson was christened in August 2009.

In Charlotte Church's Confessional Song, one line is "Poor old Father Delaney", referring to the St Mary's parish priest.

== Church Groups ==
- Altar Servers Guild of St. Stephen
- St Mary's Music Group
- Choir
- Ministers of the Word
- Extraordinary Ministers of Holy Communion
- Parish Council
- Parish Advisory Council
- Children's Liturgy
- Offertory group
- Saint Vincent de Paul Society
- Prayer Group
