= Guild of St. Stephen =

International organization of altar servers

The Guild Medal

The Archconfraternity of St Stephen or Guild of St Stephen is the international organisation of altar servers of the Catholic Church, recognised by the Holy See.

== History ==
The Guild of St Stephen was founded in 1904 by Fr Hamilton McDonald when he formed a society of altar servers at the Convent of the Sacred Heart (now Sacred Heart High School) in Hammersmith, London with the aim of improving standards of serving. The idea spread quickly and the idea was adopted at Westminster Cathedral by the then Archbishop of Westminster, Cardinal Francis Bourne. In 1905, Pope Pius X, gave his approbation to the canonical establishment of the Guild at Westminster Cathedral.

In 1906, the Sacred Congregation of Rites made the guild an Archconfraternity, enabling all parish branches to be linked with it. In 1934, the Guild spread, leading to Pope Pius XI's enabling of all Guilds throughout the British Commonwealth to be affiliated with the Archconfraternity at Westminster.

The Guild is primarily under the patronage of the Blessed Virgin Mary, as well as that of St Stephen (the Protomartyr, after whom the Guild was named), St. Thomas More, and St. Pius X.

== Purpose ==
The purpose of the Guild of St. Stephen is threefold:

1. To encourage, positively and practically, the highest standards of serving at the Church's liturgy and so contribute to the whole community's participation in a more fruitful worship of God,
2. To provide altar servers with a greater understanding of what they are doing so that they may serve with increasing reverence and prayerfulness and thereby be led to a deepening response to their vocation in life,
3. To unite servers of different parishes and dioceses for their mutual support and encouragement.

== Medals and the Guild Logo ==
Upon enrollment into the Guild, the server is presented with the Guild Medal, which is made of bronze and is worn around the neck, hanging from a red cord representing the blood of the martyrs. It is not permissible to change the colour of the cord as this is symbolic of the martyr patrons of the Guild.

Guild Medal Reverse Aspect

The medal's meaning is twofold:

1. That the parish priest, or local director of the Guild, has decided this particular server is eligible and worthy to be admitted to the Guild.
2. The server accepts and wears the medal as a sign of commitment to serve regularly and to the best of his or her ability.

The letters "XP" are in the centre of the medal, being the first two letters of the name "Christ" in Greek.

At the top is the crown of victory given by God to everyone who overcomes evil, especially those who die for him.

At the bottom are palm branches, traditional signs of martyrs who died for Christ. The motto of the Guild, "Cvi Servire Regnare Est," which means "To Serve is to Reign," is located around the edge of the front of the medal.

The Latin words "Sancti Stephani Archi Sodalitas", or "Archconfraternity of Saint Stephen," are located around the edge on the back.

The material of the medal varies depending on how long a server has been a member of the Guild, briefly:

- The Bronze Medal is that which is given to a server upon enrollment;
- The Silver Medal, after 10 years of membership of the Guild.
- The Silver Medal of Merit, after 20 years of membership of the Guild,
- The Gold Medal, after 50 years of membership of the Guild.

A Gold Medal of Merit is also available which is granted to a server after 50 years of serving but was not necessarily a member of the Guild that whole time.

Gold Medal awards are recommend by the local Director of the Guild and approved exclusively by the Central Council.

A handbook for servers is also published by the Guild, it was written by Canon Edward Mathews, a priest of Westminster Diocese.

== Organization ==
The Guild of St Stephen is led by the Superior General of the Archconfraternity, the Archbishop of Westminster. A National Director is appointed by the Superior General and reports directly to him.

A lay Central Council, consisting of the National Director, a President, Vice-President, Secretary, Treasurer and other elected members, assists in the running of the Guild. The Central Council is responsible for running the business side of the Guild (including the Guild Shop) and currently has members from throughout England and Wales ensuring a national and international outlook. The Central Council meets either in-person or virtually monthly (except August and December).

Each year the Guild of St Stephen arranges events including a National Mass alternating from Westminster Cathedral and other Cathedrals and venues around England and Wales, an AGM, Dinner and other events. The Guild publishes via its website and social media various recourses to assist local serving Guilds and Parishes to further its mission, and provide practical assistance to servers in accordance with its stated objectives.

Many ordinaries appoint a Director of the Guild for their own area to co-ordinate the Guild at a local level, either a member of the clergy or lay person, and together these form a National Council of Directors, an advisory body to the National Director.

The Guild may be erected in any parish with the permission of the local Ordinary and shall then be affiliated to the Archconfraternity, the affiliating organisation is a 'Confraternity'. Thus, in each parish, while maintaining its objects and keeping the rules of the Archconfraternity, the local Guild can be independent in its constitution and organisation.

The Archconfraternity is a member of CymFed, the Catholic Youth Ministry Federation of the Catholic Bishops' Conference of England and Wales.

The Archconfraternity is a registered charity in England and Wales.

== Membership ==
Membership of the Guild is open to any person, who has made their First Holy Communion, without limit of age, or gender (with the permission of the local ordinary), who can serve Mass, and has shown a wish to live up to the objects and standards of the Guild.

Servers must be given adequate training and reach the necessary standard before being admitted to the sanctuary. It is advisable that they should serve satisfactorily for a minimum of six months before being enrolled as a member of the Guild.

The parish priest, or the local director of the Guild, decides whether a candidate is eligible and worthy of admission to the Guild, and is empowered to perform the ceremony of enrollment and invest the server with the Guild medal.

Members of the Guild of St Stephen are bound to follow various rules, including:

- Serving at the altar with reverence, understanding and regularity and with due attention to personal cleanliness and tidiness;
- Saying short prayers in preparation for and in thanksgiving after, serving Mass;
- Observing silence in the sacristy and great reverence in the sanctuary;
- Reciting the Prayer of the Guild of St Stephen every day.

== The Guild Prayer ==
O God, you accept our ministry and allow us to serve at your Altar; grant that while serving you we follow the example of our Patron, St Stephen, the first martyr, and that we may, like him come to see Jesus standing at your right hand in the kingdom of heaven.

We ask this through Jesus Christ, your Son.

Amen
