= St Peter's Church, Roath =

Church in Cardiff, Wales

St Peter's Church
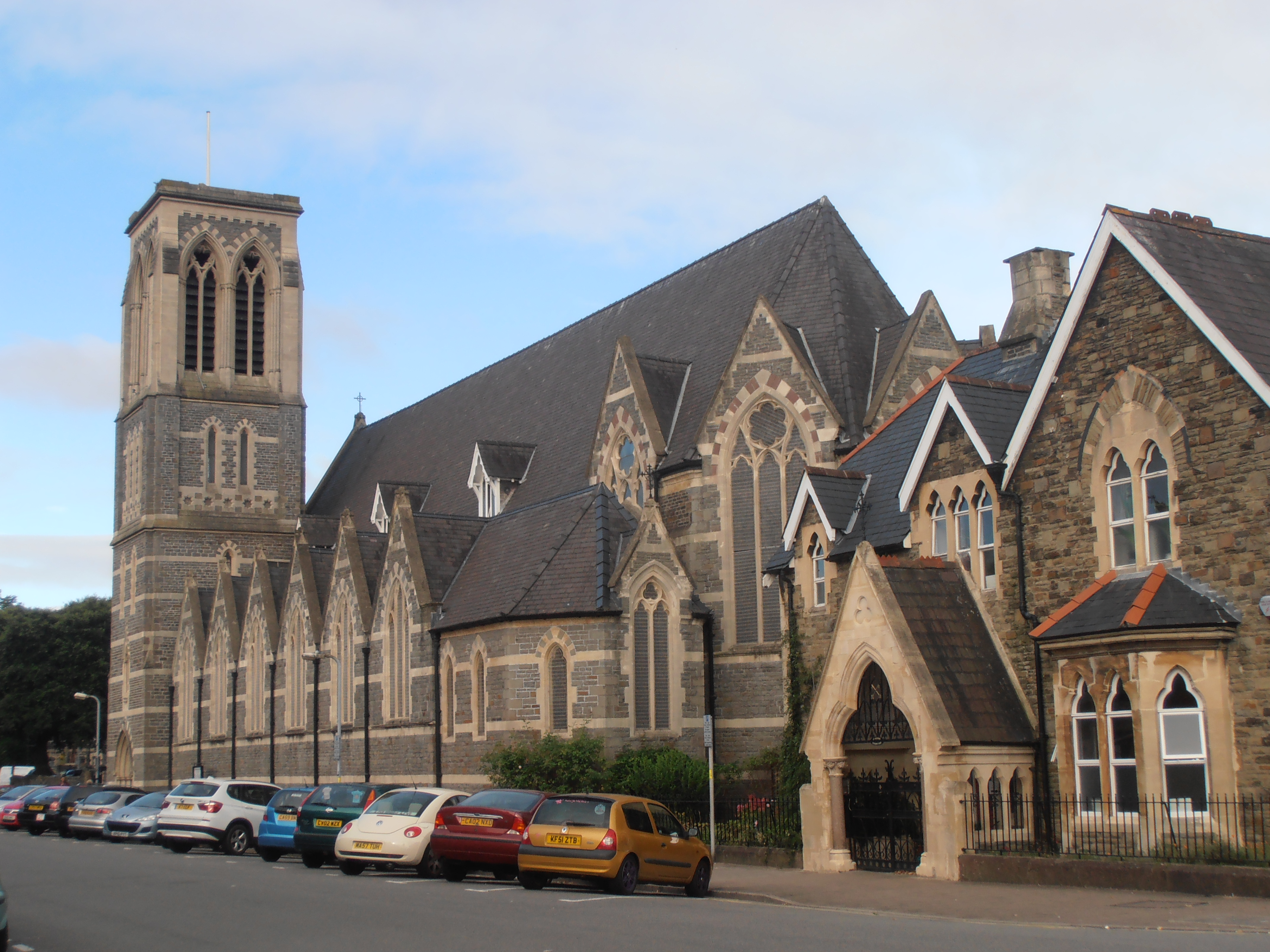
- St. Peter's Church, as viewed looking down St. Peter's Street, Plasnewydd
- St Peter's Church
- 51.4868°N 3.1684°W
- Denomination: Roman Catholic
- Website: https://www.stpeters-roath.co.uk/

History
- Status: active
- Founded: 1858
- Dedication: St Peter
- Consecrated: 28 June 1948

Architecture
- Heritage designation: Grade II*
- Designated: 19 May 1975
- Architect: Charles Hansom
- Architectural type: Gothic Revival
- Style: Geometrical
- Groundbreaking: 1858
- Completed: 1883

Specifications
- Capacity: 1000
- Materials: Pennant sandstone, Bath stone, Radyr stone

Administration
- Province: Cardiff-Menevia
- Archdiocese: Cardiff-Menevia
- Deanery: Cardiff
- Parish: St Peter in Roath

St Peter's Church, Roath is the oldest surviving Roman Catholic church in Cardiff, the capital of Wales. It is administered by the Rosminians.

== History ==
When the Rosminians (the Institute of Charity) first arrived in Cardiff in 1854, the town had a significant Roman Catholic population but only one place of worship, St David's chapel in the town centre (this building would be replaced in the 1880s by the church which became Cardiff Metropolitan Cathedral). In 1858, a site was secured near City Road (then called Plwcca Lane) on a 999-year lease, and the necessary funds were raised. Owing to anti-Catholicism in the area, plans to extend East Grove, forming a junction with Richmond Road, were scrapped because the objectors did not want a Catholic church fronting a main street. Charles Hansom designed the original church in 1860. The church was initially designed with a tower and spire, but these designs proved over-ambitious, and when the church was opened in 1861, it was without either.

The early days of St Peter's were not easy. The area was much-afflicted by poverty and drunkenness, and was far away from the Catholic districts, making work challenging for early priests, and low attendance figures were often a problem. After the conversion of John Crichton-Stuart, 3rd Marquess of Bute, to Catholicism in 1868, and a rigorous fundraising programme, the situation began to improve, with the founding of a school in 1872. The presbytery was also added, in Gothic Revival style, designed by W. P. James. In 1883, the tower was finally added at the expense of Lord Bute (the planned spire was never added). The stained glass in the sanctuary dates from 1882, each window costing £160. A statue of Saint Peter over the church entrance was added in 1912, and additional dormer windows were installed in 1926.

As the Cathedral in the city centre had been very badly damaged during a 1941 air raid, episcopal functions moved into St Peter's between 1941 and 1945. St Peter's was also hit by an incendiary bomb, seeing extensive damage to the roof of the lady chapel. This damage was later repaired, and the church was finally consecrated in 1948 after clearing the last of its debts. A parish hall was built in 1955, and the church became a Grade II* listed building in 1975.

The school was moved to a different location in 1977, and the old building was demolished in 1981.

Between 1970 and 1987, the priest at St Peter's was Father Gil Jones, who welcomed the visiting Pope John Paul II to Cardiff on 2 April 1982.

The church was extensively redecorated in 2001.

=== Organs ===
The first organ at St Peter's was a two-manual English-style instrument built by Thompson and Shackell. It was completely rebuilt in 1963 by R.V. Gill.

In 2004, a large donation in the will of Sir Julian Hodge allowed for a new organ to be installed, which was named in his honour. The three-manual Continental-style organ was built by the Swiss firm Späth Orgelbau and was completed in 2006. The inaugural recital was given by Dame Gillian Weir on 4 November 2006.

== Gallery ==
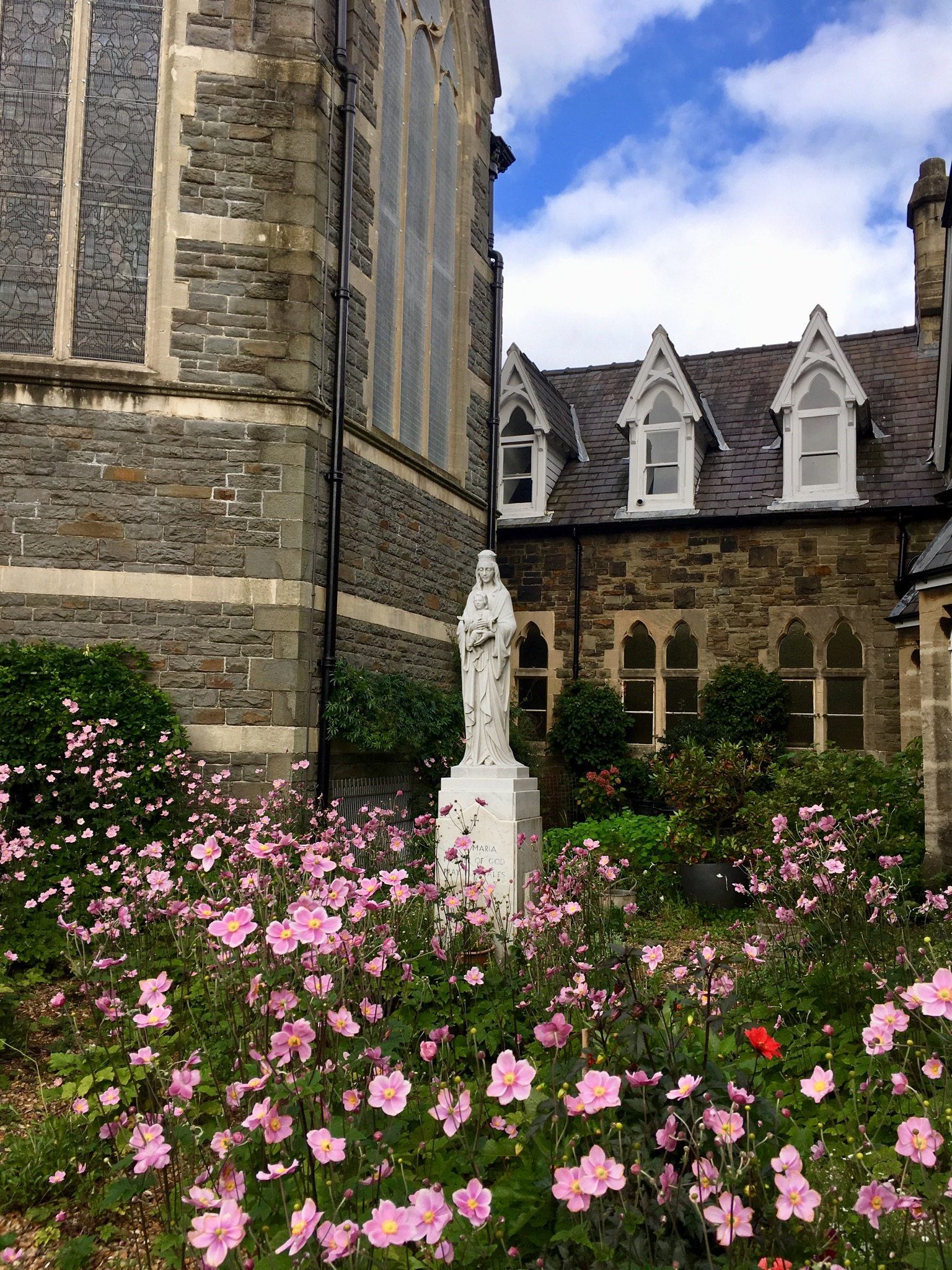
Statue of the Madonna

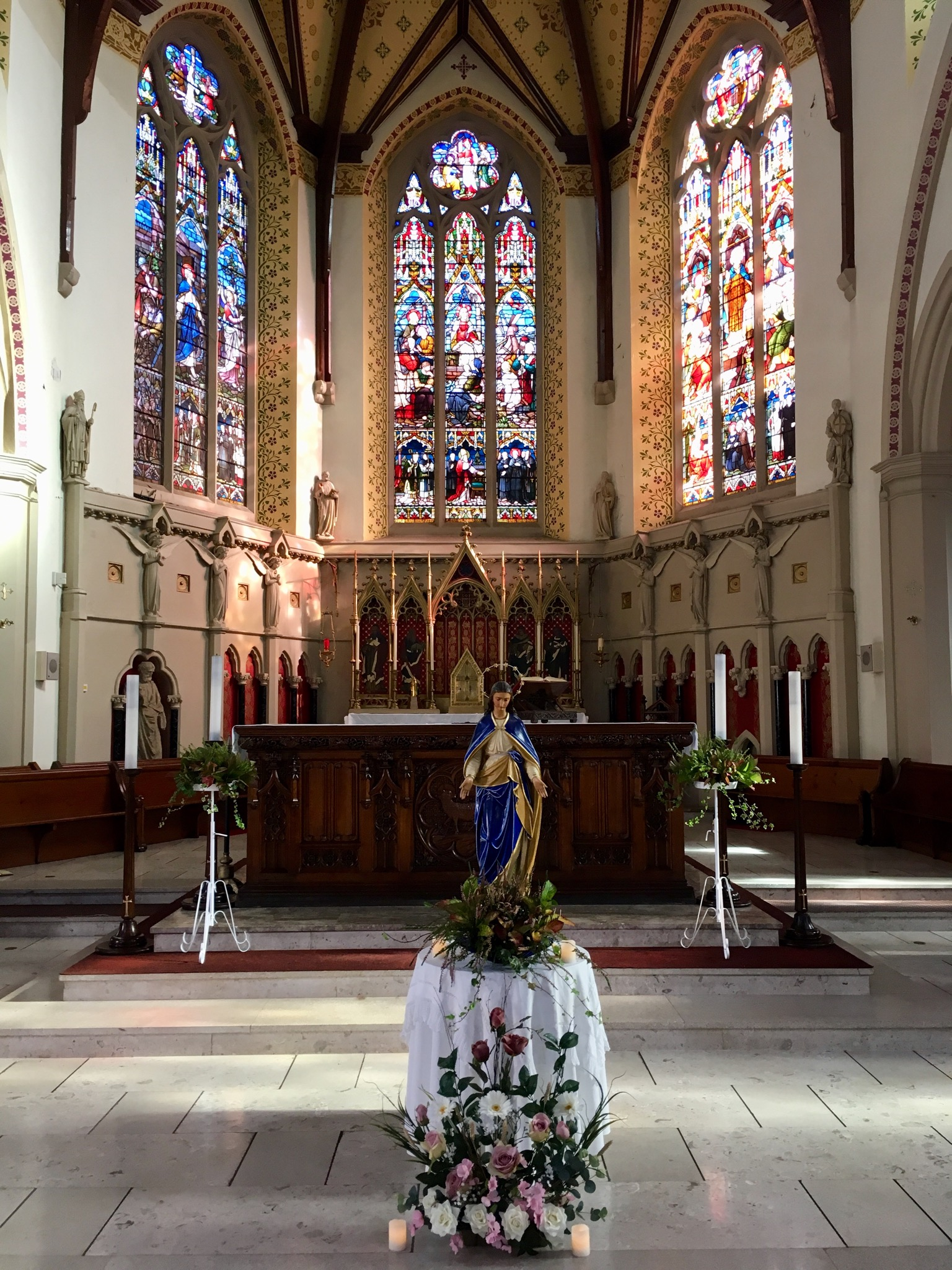
The main altar

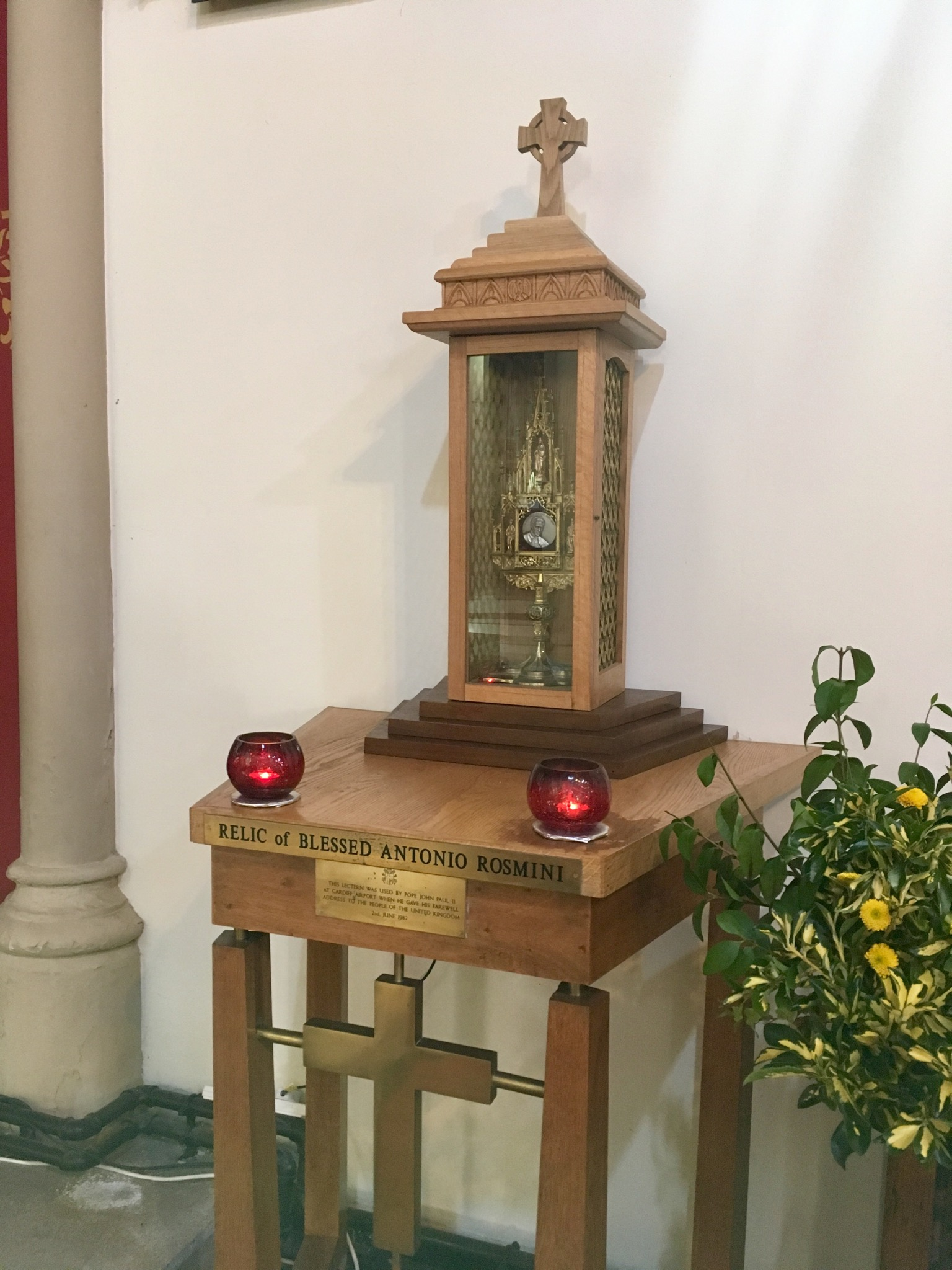
Relics of Antonio Rosmini and Pope John Paul II

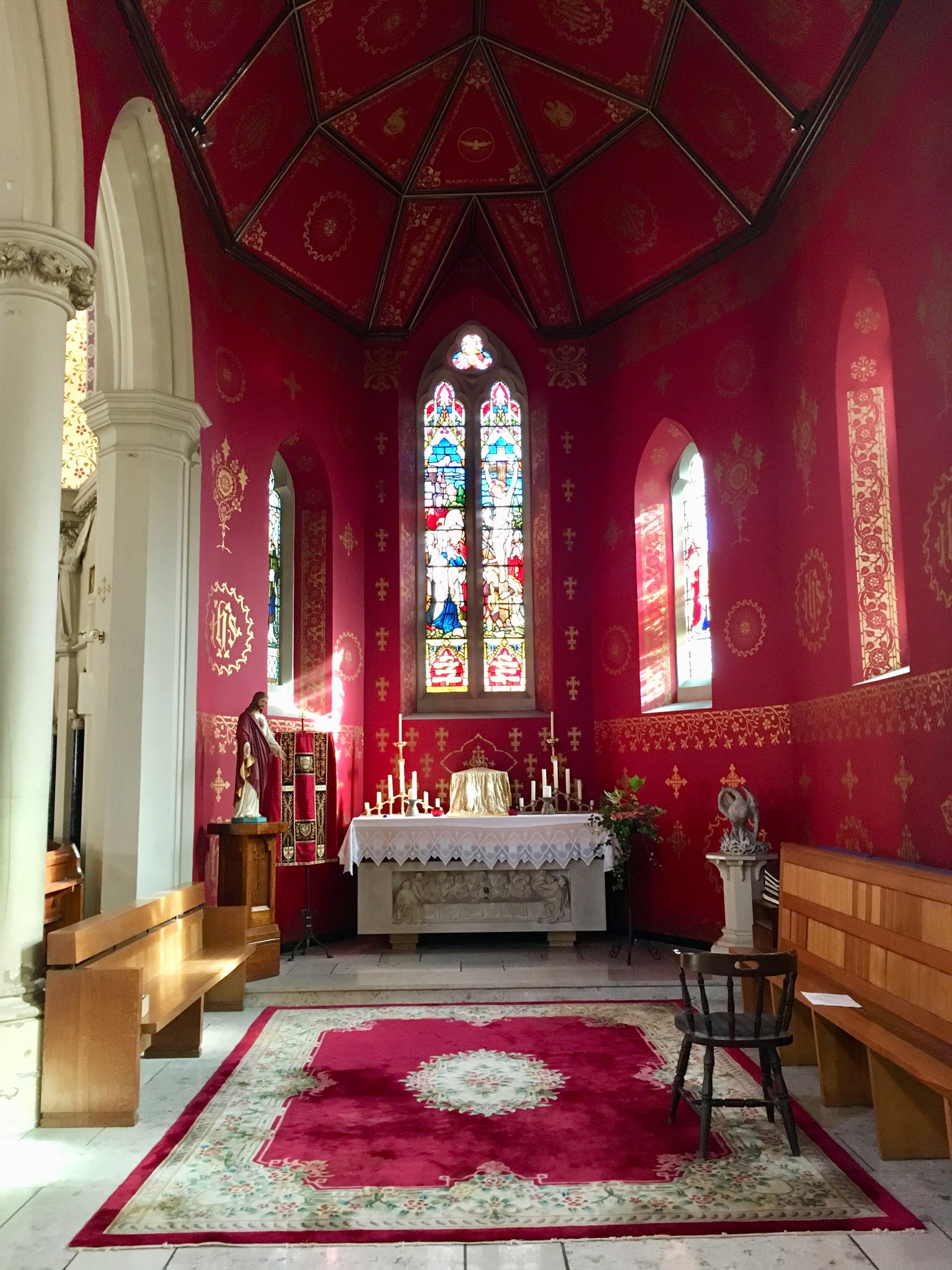
A side chapel

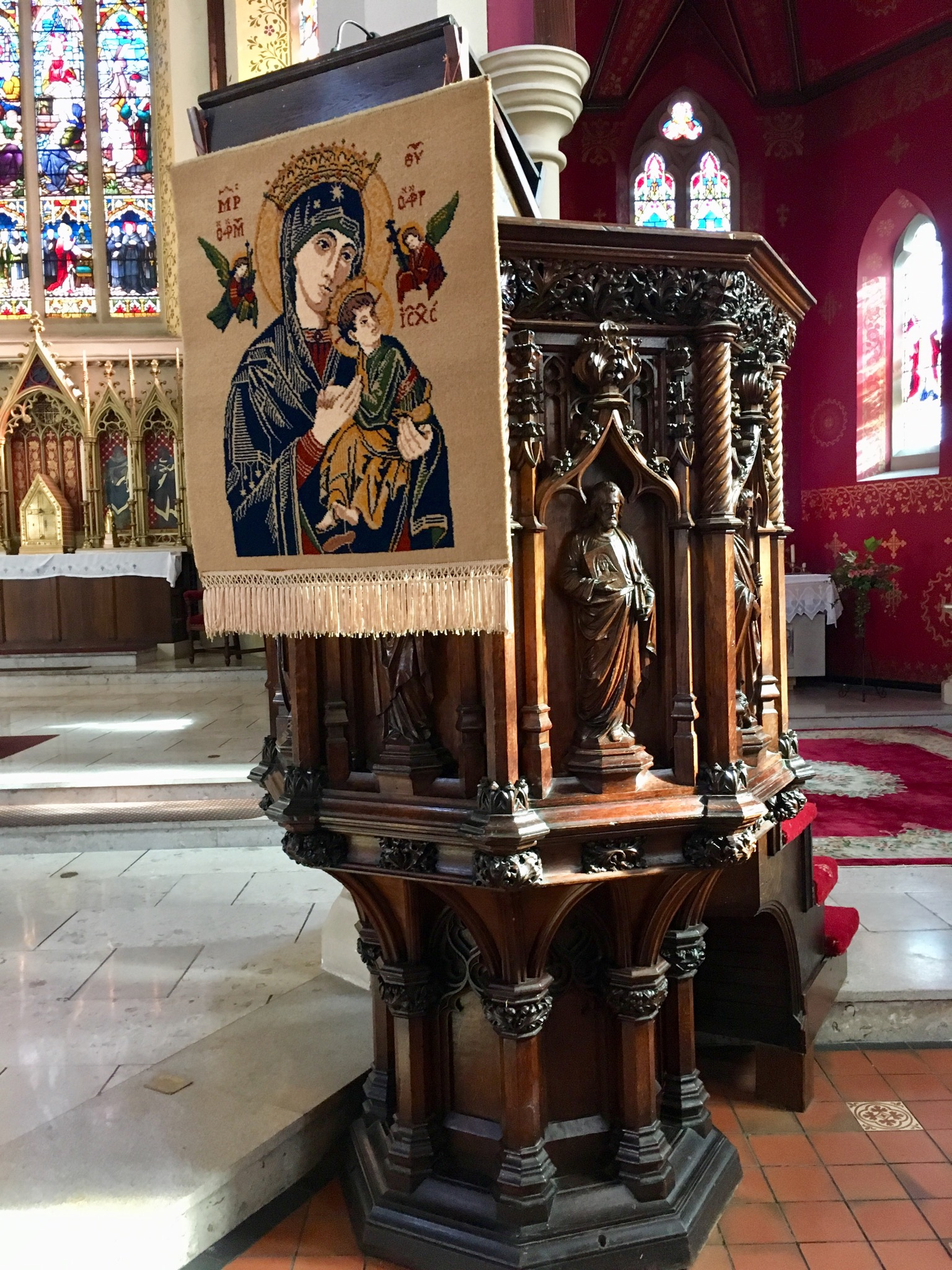
Pulpit
