= Caerau, Cardiff =

Community in Cardiff, Wales

Caerau
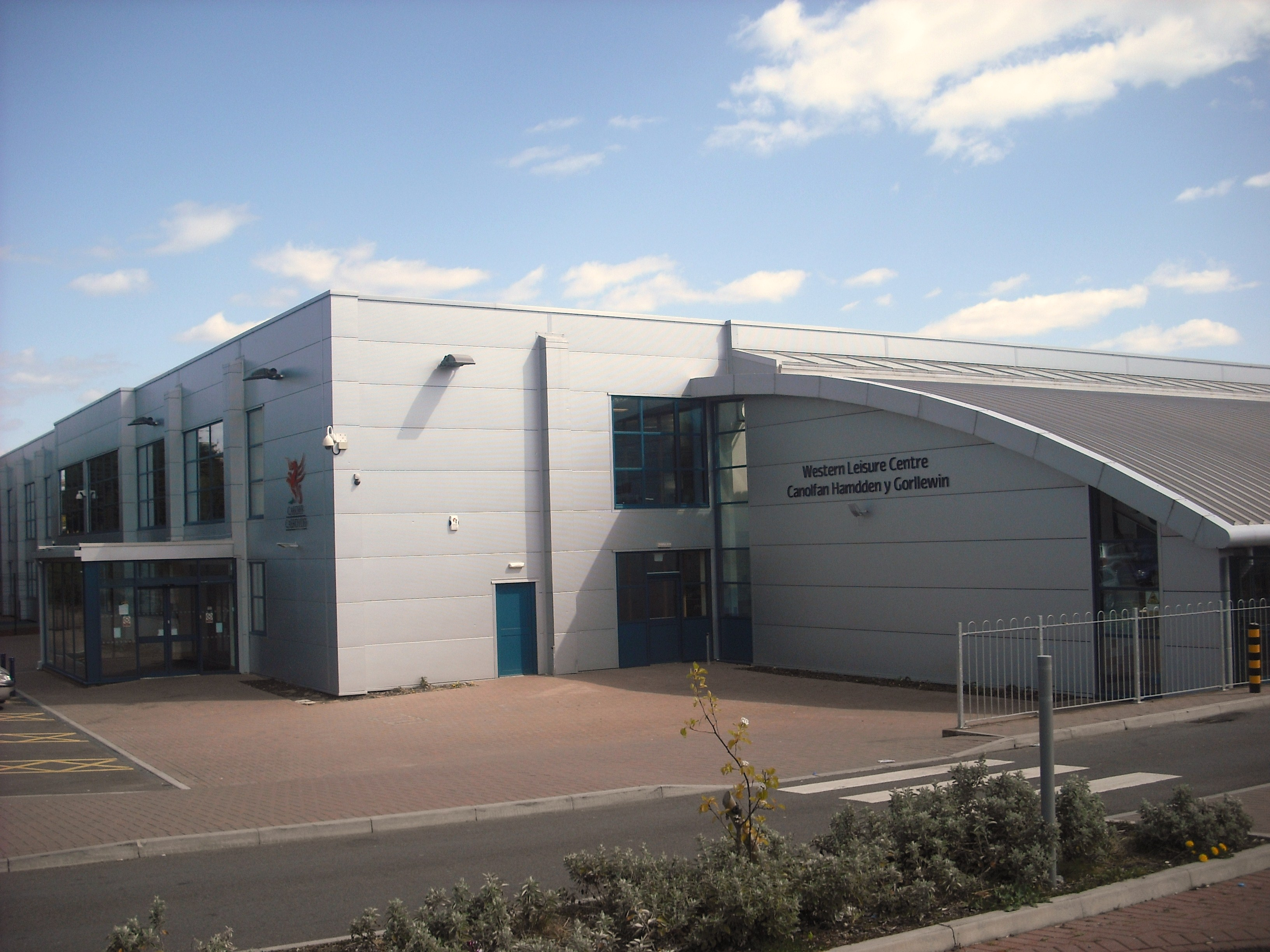
- Western Leisure Centre

- Location within Cardiff
- Population: 11,318 (2011)
- Community: Caerau
- Principal area: Cardiff
- Preserved county: South Glamorgan
- Country: Wales
- Sovereign state: United Kingdom
- Post town: CARDIFF
- Postcode district: CF5
- Dialling code: 029
- Police: South Wales
- Fire: South Wales
- Ambulance: Welsh
- UK Parliament: Cardiff West
- Senedd Cymru – Welsh Parliament: Caerdydd Penarth
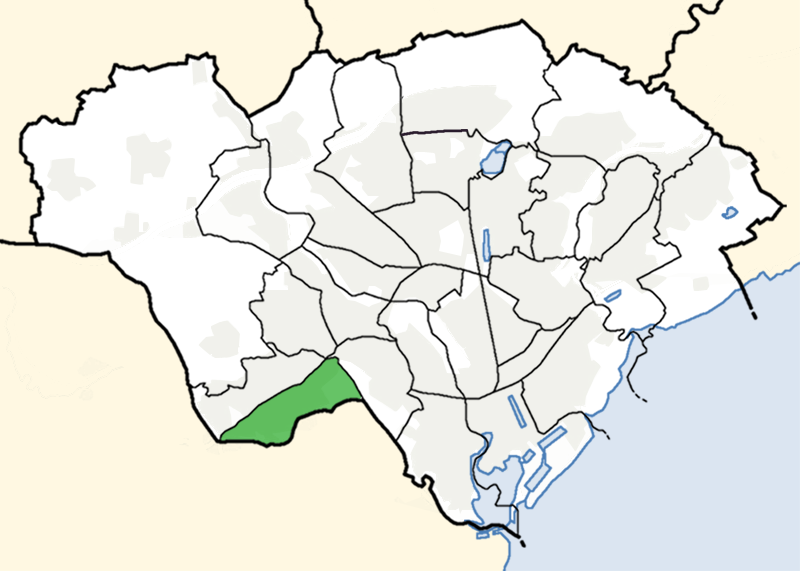
- List of places UK Wales Cardiff 51.473611°N 3.245556°W

Caerau ([ˈkai̯r.ai]) is a community in the west of Cardiff, capital city of Wales. Often considered part of Wenvoe by gully, Heol Trelai is the main road or avenue, lined with large trees. Dominated mostly by private housing, it has the Western Leisure Centre, supermarkets, schools and churches.

== History ==
Caerau, named after the Welsh language word for 'Forts', sits at the base of a hill slope on the edge of Cardiff.

In 2012, Caerau Hillfort underwent a dig by archaeological television programme Time Team. The research showed that the Iron Age site consists of a substantial hilltop surrounded by multi-vallate earthworks (rings of banks and ditches) that have been cut through at the southeastern extent by a major road. It also uncovered that Caerau was likely a tribal capital for the Silures, who were powerful local people who strongly resisted Roman incursions into their land. The dig unearthed pottery and armoury that dated back to 1,000 B.C. In 1894, a Roman villa was discovered on the Racecourse and excavations were carried out in 1922. The results showed several outbuildings and bathing facilities used to exist there.

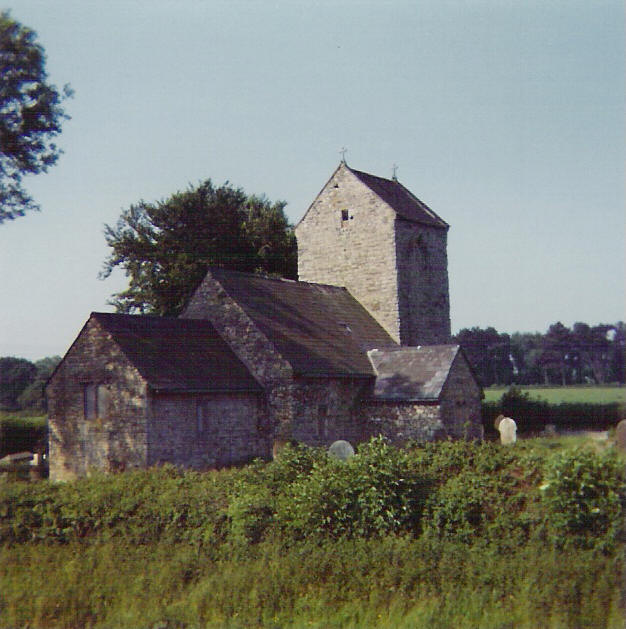
St Mary's Church, Caerau

The former village of Caerau officially became part of Cardiff in 1922. Many homes and schools were built on the old Ely Racecourse, although enough of it was preserved to become Trelai Park. The historic parish church of St. Mary is now in an advanced state of ruin.

== Amenities ==
Caerau features numerous shopping parades. Two large supermarkets (Aldi and Farmfoods) are located just off Cowbridge Road West on nearby Treseder Way. The area also has a large Lidl store and a small Lloyds Pharmacy on Caerau Lane. Other amenities include a laundrette, pet supply store and multiple newspaper and convenience stores.

Caerau Rugby Football Club won the Mallet Cup in 2000 and 2007, and Caerau Football Club was formed in 1955.

== Education ==
Primary Schools:

- Millbank Primary School
- Pencaerau Primary School
- Trelai Primary School
- Ysgol Gymraeg Nant Caerau

Secondary Schools:

- Cardiff West Community High School
- Mary Immaculate High School

== Transport ==
The district is on Cardiff Bus's bus route, with high frequency electric buses operating on routes 17 (Ely /Canton / Wood Street) and 18 (Canton/Wood Street) through Caerau and 13 (/Drope/Ely) also run along Cowbridge Road West (A48), along the very northern edge of Caerau, which is the main road for the area, linking it to Culverhouse Cross to the west and Ely, Canton and the city centre to the east.

== Politics ==
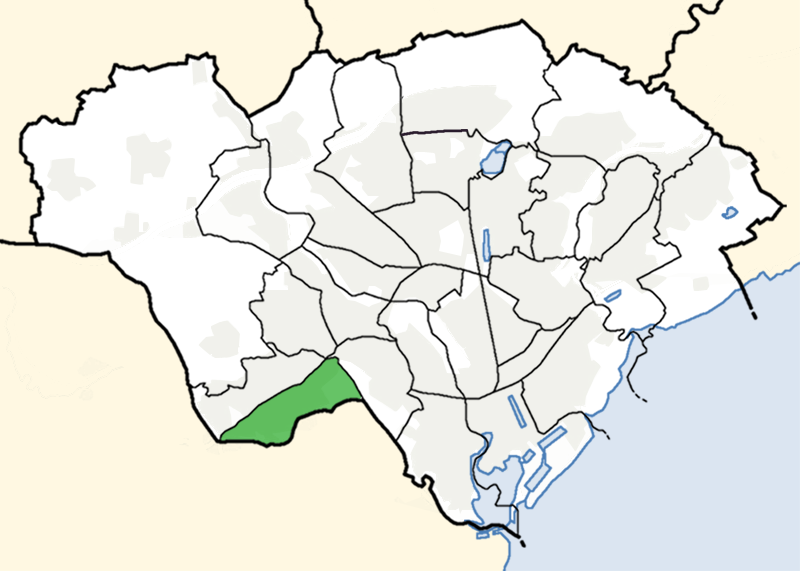
Caerau electoral ward in Cardiff

Caerau is both an electoral ward, and a community of the City of Cardiff. There is no community council for the area. The electoral ward of Caerau falls within the parliamentary constituency of Cardiff West. It is bounded by Ely to the northwest; Canton to the northeast; and the Vale of Glamorgan to the south.

Caerau has been represented by Labour councillors Peter Bradbury and Elaine Simmons since May 2012. Prior to this, the ward had been represented by Liberal Democrat councillors, including previous Lord Mayor Jacqui Gasson who'd served the ward for 24 years.

== Notable people ==
- Noel Sullivan, member of early 2000s pop group Hear'Say.
- Jason Mohammad, BBC Wales newsreader.
- Nicky Piper, (born 5 May 1966) Super middleweight and light heavyweight boxer. His career was at its peak in the 1990s.
- Henry Morgan, 16th century pirate
- David Cotterill, Welsh Footballer.
- Steve Robinson, World champion boxer
