= 2023 Cardiff riot =

Incident of violent disorder in Wales

2023 Ely riot
- Date: 22–23 May 2023
- Location: Ely, Cardiff, Wales, United Kingdom
- Methods: Rioting, arson, assault

Casualties
- Arrested: 9

Rioting took place in Ely, a residential district of Cardiff in Wales, on the night of the 22 and 23 May 2023. Following confrontations with rioters, up to 12 South Wales Police officers were injured; a member of the public was attacked, multiple vehicles were set on fire and damage to property was reported.

Initial reports stated that the rioting followed the death of two teenage boys in a road traffic collision in the area; rumours spread on social media immediately after the crash suggested that police were involved in the collision. The Police and Crime Commissioner for South Wales Alun Michael said the police were not chasing the boys at the time, and the police later said, after CCTV footage was discovered and verified, that they had earlier been following them.

An investigation into the road traffic accident would later lead to the IOPC serving gross misconduct notices to two officers involved in the incident. Thirty one people have since been charged in connection with the riot.

== Background ==
Ely is a large residential area with approximately 14,600 residents on the outskirts of Cardiff, about 3 miles (5 km) from the city centre. According to the BBC, it houses "a close-knit working class community", and has a high level of deprivation. It was the scene of a five-day riot in 1991; community regeneration projects commenced in the aftermath of those events.

The 1991 riots compounded the area's poor reputation for crime and youth delinquency, but community initiatives have sought to address these issues and many locals feel that Ely has been unfairly stigmatised. In 2011, Mark Drakeford, the local Welsh Assembly member, pointed to the loss of major employers, including the Arjo Wiggins paper mill and the Ely Hospital, as key factors behind local economic deprivation.

On 26 May family members said that the electric bike ridden by the two teenagers had been an early 16th birthday present.

== Events of 22 and 23 May 2023 ==
=== Fatal road traffic collision ===
At 5.59 pm on 22 May, two teenage boys were seen travelling on an electric bike, towards a police van, on Frank Road in the area. At 6.00 pm the bike turned round and was followed by the van. At 6.01 the van turned onto Howell Avenue and at 6.02 reached Grand Avenue. At 6.06 the van was on Cowbridge Road West when it received reports of a road traffic collision. Shortly after 6 pm the boys died in a road traffic collision on Snowden Road. They were identified as two friends who lived nearby.

Rumours quickly spread on social media that the police had been involved in the collision. Alun Michael, the Police and Crime Commissioner for South Wales, stated the following morning that the police arrived at the scene only after the fatal crash had taken place. Later, BBC News verified time-stamped CCTV footage appearing to show a police van following two people riding an electric bicycle on Frank Road, 1/2 mile (900 m) away from the crash scene, at 5:59 pm. The police force confirmed that they had been following the teenagers at that point.

=== Rioting ===
Several hours of rioting occurred, lasting from the evening of 22 May into the early hours of the morning of 23 May. An estimated 100 to 150 people gathered at the site of the crash. At 8:21 pm, police tweeted that they were trying to de-escalate disorder at the scene; at 11:15 pm, they reported "large-scale disorder" in the area. By 1:10 am on 23 May, police reported multiple cars being set alight. Fireworks and other projectiles were thrown at police, while a man was assaulted when rioters mistook him for an undercover police officer. Rioters were described as consisting of "scores of youths, many covering their faces with masks". The rioting was livestreamed on social media. The police moved to disperse rioters at around 3 am. Mounted police officers were stationed outside the local police station, out of concerns it would be targeted by rioters.

Police have said that the link between the crash and subsequent disorder was "unclear". The Guardian described the rumours of police involvement as "false" and as the "trigger" for the rioting which followed.

== Aftermath ==
By the late morning of 23 May, the BBC reported that up to 12 police officers had been injured. An unconfirmed number of arrests had been made and investigations were ongoing.

On the morning of 24 May, Alun Michael stated on BBC Radio 4's Today programme that he had been assured by the police that they had not been chasing the boys and that there was no police vehicle on the same road as the crash at the time it occurred. He also said that the circumstances of the collision would need to be thoroughly investigated.

On 24 May a family friend said they believed the boys had evaded police by riding along Stanwey Road, which is blocked to traffic at one end, then turned onto the adjacent Snowden Road, where the crash occurred. The source said, "The reason why the police wasn't on the scene is because the boys have gone through a blocked street and the police knew they couldn't go that way so they have turned onto Grand Avenue, which led the boys to cut through onto Stanway Road onto Snowden Road. ... The police have already stated they were on Grand Avenue and they were not on the scene. They weren't on the scene because they lost them.”

Interviewed by the BBC, First Minister of Wales Mark Drakeford suggested that Alun Michael had been "entitled" to rely on information supplied to him by South Wales Police in the aftermath of the crash. He said that calls for Michael to resign were to "trivialise the reaction to these tragic events" adding, "I'm very determined not to turn anything that happened in Ely into a political football involving individuals."

On 25 May it was reported that nine people had been arrested for allegedly taking part in the riot: four men, aged 16, 17, 18 and 29, were arrested in Ely and one man, aged 21, was arrested in Tremorfa on the morning of 25 May. All were in custody on suspicion of riot. They followed four arrests made earlier, including two 15-year-old boys from Ely and Llanrumney, a 15-year-old girl from Roath and a 16-year-old boy also from Ely. All were all on bail pending further inquiries.

On the evening of 26 May a vigil in memory of the boys, attended by at least 800 people, was held in Snowden Road, the scene of the crash. The families asked attendees to bring blue balloons and had requested the police not to be present. The family of one of the boys also asked for "peace within the community" and asked people to allow the police to investigate and "get the answers we so desperately need".

The Independent Office for Police Conduct (IOPC) opened an investigation into: i) the nature of the police interaction with the two boys prior to the collision and the appropriateness of the police officers’ decisions and actions; ii) whether at any time the decisions and actions of the officers in the police vehicle constituted a pursuit; iii) whether the interaction between the police officers and the boys was reported appropriately by the officers prior to and following the collision; and iv) whether the actions and decisions of South Wales Police over the interaction were in line with legislation, local and national policies and procedures.

On 1 June, initial evidence presented at the inquest, at Pontypridd Coroner's Court, was that one boy died from blunt injury to the head and one from blunt injury to the head and trunk. The coroner described the deaths as violent or unnatural. They had been found by a member of the public.

On 13 June the IOPC issued a statement, saying, "As part of our investigation, we have served gross misconduct notices on two police officers, the driver and passenger in a marked police van, which was seen on CCTV footage driving behind the boys' electric bike a short time prior to the fatal collision on 22 May."

The funeral for the two boys was held on 6 July 2023, at the Church of the Resurrection, the Anglican parish church, on Grand Avenue in Ely, followed by burial in Western Cemetery and a wake at the Vale Sports Arena. The church, which holds about 1,200 people, was completely filled by the service, with another estimated 800 mourners outside. It followed a procession of two limousines, four hearses and eight white Rolls-Royce cars, along with around a dozen motorbikes arranged by the boys' friends.

Thirty one people have since been charged in connection with the riot.
