= Ely riot =

Ely riot or Ely riots may refer to:

- Ely and Littleport riots of 1816, in the Isle of Ely, Cambridgeshire
- Cardiff Ely bread riots, in Cardiff in 1991
- 2023 Cardiff riot, in Ely, Cardiff in 2023
