= Innovate Trust =

Independent charity registered in the UK

Innovate Trust is an independent charity registered in the UK. Based in Cardiff operating across South East Wales. Innovate Trust provides supported living services to adults with learning disabilities, mental health conditions, physical disabilities or sensory impairments in Cardiff, the Vale of Glamorgan and Rhondda Cynon Taf.

The charity is based on Cowbridge Road East in Canton, Cardiff. The charity employees over 850 individuals across a 20-mile radius, primarily as support workers. Innovate Trust is one of the largest supported living providers operating in South East Wales. The charity was originally established by a group of student volunteers, including the charities main founder Jim Mansell CBE, from Cardiff University in the academic year of 1967/68. The charity was originally called Cardiff Universities Social Services or C.U.S.S. before being renamed to "Innovate Trust" on 22 April 2002 by Rhodri Morgan AM.

== History ==
=== Early development (1967–1973) ===
Innovate Trust was formally named Cardiff Universities Social Services (C.U.S.S.). It was established as a student volunteering project in the academic year of 1967. The volunteers worked supporting adults with learning disabilities at Ely Hospital to go on day trips, learn new skills and to act as a social contact. The volunteers worked with a group of 25 adults with learning disabilities.

=== The first supported living home (1974) ===
After the success of the early volunteering project, the students felt more could be done to improve the lives of those with learning disabilities. After much planning and preparation, working with Cardiff University, Cardiff Council and Ely Hospital the volunteers opened the UK’s first traditional group home on 13 July 1974 at 12 Ruthin Gardens, Cathays, Cardiff. Five adults with learning disabilities from the hospital moved into the property with three student volunteers. During the day the group home tenants would spend their time at Trelai adult training centre whilst the students were attending lectures.

=== Expansion and further development (1975–1983) ===
After the success of the group home experiment, the charity relocated the tenants to a more stable residency at Kings Road in Cardiff. The volunteers spent the next nine years raising awareness of this new model of support delivery, sharing their lessons with local authorities, hospitals and universities. The charity went on to open more group homes, funded by the Welsh Office consisting of both volunteers and paid staff support workers. Part of the charities work in this time included producing reports, evaluations and recommendations for the Welsh Office and Cardiff Council.

In 1977, the charity opened a short respite centre for adults with learning disabilities on Boverton Street in Cardiff. This home was used to provide a break for carers and adults with learning disabilities who still lived at home with their families. The property was moved to Hamilton Street in Canton, Cardiff in 1980 where it is still operated by the charity.

In response to the charities work with learning disabilities, the social services department at Cardiff County Council set up a new department in 1981, called NIMROD or New Ideas for Mentally Retarded in Ordinary Dwellings, in order to replicate and extend the Cardiff Universities Social Services model of providing support to adults with learning disabilities, opening a number of supported living homes in Cardiff and the surrounding areas.

In 1983, partially in response to the Ely Hospital Scandal, the Welsh Office launched the "All Wales Strategy for the development of Services for mentally handicapped people". This new piece of legislation, requiring local authorities to move away from the institutionalised model of support, highlighted Cardiff Universities Social Services as an archetypal model to be shared across Wales.

=== Sharing the C.U.S.S. model (1984–1990) ===
In response to the All Wales Strategy, supported living expanded rapidly across Wales, and the rest of the UK, with Cardiff Universities Social Services taking a leading role in either directly setting up new services or advising newly formed bodies on resettlement and supported living.

In 1985 C.U.S.S. helped develop the Opportunity Housing Trust (renamed to Mirus in 2012), a large organisation set up to extend the C.U.S.S. supported living model across Wales by providing advice, guidance and transferring staff and trustees to the newly formed charity.

In 1988, after many years of rapid expansion, Cardiff Universities Social Services, working with Mencap Cymru, the Welsh Office and parents groups split its operations, combined with new contracts from local authorities to create Catrefi Cymru; another all wales supported living charity adopting the C.U.S.S. approach.

=== Diversification (1991–onward) ===
After several years of expansion and later reduction, the charity remained with a large number of supported living homes in Cardiff and the Vale of Glamorgan but began to expand the range of services they provided for adults with learning disabilities across South East Wales. In 1991 the charity launched a bespoke employment agency for adults with learning disabilities called Quest. In 1997 the charity established two emergency accommodation centres for adults with learning disabilities in crisis to stop them from becoming homeless.

In 2001, the charity was renamed to Innovate Trust and made a formal partnership with Student Volunteering Cardiff - SVC (previously known as Cardiff Student Community Action – CSCA) a charity that had been working alongside C.U.S.S since its origins. In 2003 the charity added a catering division to support adults with learning disabilities to learn to cook and to have meaningful employment, consisting of a catering company and three cafes across Cardiff and the Vale.

In 2013 the charity expanded its operations to provide supported living services for an additional 89 adults with learning disabilities in Rhondda Cynon Taff, also opening a new regional office in Talbot Green Business Park, Pontyclun. In 2014 the charity launched a new department called Green Days carrying out environmental work, training and outdoor opportunities for adults with learning disabilities

In 2017, Innovate Trust launched a new research project in partnership with Nesta, the Welsh Government and Cardiff University exploring 'intelligent personal assistant' technology and the use of smart speakers for supported living tenants. The charity was awarded the Wales Council for Voluntary Action’s digital inclusion award for its innovative and inclusive use of technology. This is the first known project of its kind and received a lot of attention from various media outlets. After the initial research project the charity expanded this technology to all 197 individuals it supports in Cardiff and the Vale of Glamorgan.

== See also ==
- Supported living
- Social care in the United Kingdom
