= Bartley Wilson =

English association football club manager

Personal information
- Full name: Walter Bartley Wilson
- Date of birth: 3 January 1870
- Place of birth: Bristol, England
- Date of death: 19 November 1954 (aged 84)
- Place of death: Cardiff, Wales

Managerial career
- Years: Team
- 1933–1934: Cardiff City

Walter Bartley Wilson (3 January 1870 – 19 November 1954) was an English lithographic artist and the founder of Cardiff City Football Club. Born in Bristol, he moved to Cardiff in 1897 where he became involved with Riverside Cricket Club. Encouraged by the increasing popularity of football, he helped found Riverside A.F.C., the club that would eventually become Cardiff City F.C.

Wilson was instrumental in the club moving from local amateur league to being a fully professional football club in 1910 by joining the Second Division of the Southern Football League. He also led the club's efforts to secure ground on which to build a home stadium, which went on to become Ninian Park, and was appointed manager in 1933 for a brief spell.

== Early life ==
Wilson was born on 3 January 1870 in St Mary Redcliffe, Bristol. The son of Thomas Wilson, a former publican who had become a brushmaker, and Sarah Hathaway, a teacher, Wilson was orphaned in his youth. He was born with a clubfoot and was unable to walk without using sticks. Along with his cousin, Arthur Spurll (who would go on to become editor of the Bristol Evening Post), he was brought up by his grandmother Jane Hathaway in Barossa Place, Bristol.

== Establishment of Cardiff City F.C. ==
=== Early years ===
In 1897, Wilson left Bristol and moved to Cardiff. He was a fan of cricket and soon became involved with the Riverside Cricket Club. He and the club's officials were worried that the cricket team would become separated during the winter months. Wilson noted that association football had taken root within his home of Bristol; Bristol City and Bristol Eastville Rovers both turned professional in 1897. Wilson came up with the idea of forming a football team in his now adopted city of Cardiff and advertised the idea in the Riverside Pavilion. The first meeting took place at 1 Coldstream Terrace but drew a poor turnout with only five attendees. However, a second meeting drew around a dozen members and subsequently Riverside A.F.C was formed in 1899. The committee with Bartley Wilson elected as secretary was made up of A.J. Stone, George Pearce, Jimmy Redfern, Stanley Barrett, Andrew Sheen, E.W. Holder, Billy Canter and Frank Burfitt. The group decided on a kit of chocolate and amber quartered shirts and set an annual membership fee of 2s 6d.

The club was formed too late to join the Cardiff & District League in the 1899–1900 season and instead began playing friendly matches against local sides, with their first match taking place on 7 October 1899 against Barry West End. Wilson combined his role as club secretary alongside his day job at a local printers. He spent much of his free time at the club's headquarters, a disused stables in Mark Street less than 100 yards (91 m) from his home. In 1900, the club secured admission to the Cardiff & District League to play in an organised division for the first time. Wilson oversaw the amalgamation of Riverside and Riverside Albion in 1902. Three years later, Cardiff was officially named a city by King Edward VII and Wilson immediately applied to the South Wales and Monmouthshire Football Association (SWMFA) to change the name of the team to Cardiff City. However, the club was deemed to be playing at too low a level to represent the city. To improve the club's status, the Committee successfully applied for election to the South Wales Amateur League.

In September 1908, Riverside A.F.C were officially granted permission by the SWMFA to adopt the name Cardiff City, although they were given the caveat that, should a professional club emerge in the city, the club would be required to forfeit the name.

=== Southern Football League ===
His foresight was remarkable. We decided that this bigger piece of land could hold at least 10,000 – we never realised that one day it would hold 60,000!

— Cardiff City Committee member Ivor Parker describing Wilson's vision for the Sloper Road site.

With the new name in place, Wilson sought to capitalise on the growing popularity of the sport. However, when approached by Harry Bradshaw, the secretary of the Southern Football League, the club were forced to turn down the offer of a place in the league due to the poor facilities of their Sophia Gardens ground. The club arranged friendlies against several sides from The Football League; Bristol City, Middlesbrough and Crystal Palace all travelled to Cardiff. Wilson and the club's Committee were encouraged by the turnouts for the matches and decided to focus on securing an appropriate ground to play at. He approached Bute Estate in the hope of purchasing land at Leckwith Common but local Councillor John Mander instead offered the club a piece of land on Sloper Road with the added incentive that Cardiff Corporation would assist in the construction of the ground. The club became leaseholders of the land on 1 April 1909 and set about flattening the former rubbish tip on the site to erect a new football ground.

Wilson and solicitor Norman Robertson officially registered Cardiff City Association Football Club Ltd as an entity on 21 April 1910 with Robertson's office listed as the club's registered address. In 1910, Cardiff City became a professional club, joining the Southern Football League. Following the club's admission, club director Herbert Frew Jones credited Wilson with the club's progress from an amateur side with 12 members to a fully professional club in just over a decade, stating "It was always Bart who was the prime mover. Cardiff City would never have been Cardiff City if it had not been for Bart". Wilson was initially placed in charge of the first team and secured the first transfer in the club's history by signing Jack Evans from amateur side Cwmparc for 6s. Wilson later joked that Evans' fee was "all we had and it included his train fare from Treorchy!" The club appointed its first official manager soon after with Davy McDougall taking over responsibility for the first team. McDougall remained in charge for a single season before the club decided a more experienced manager was needed and appointed Fred Stewart in his place. Wilson instead took charge of the club's reserve side.

=== The Football League ===
In 1920, Cardiff became the first Welsh club to be elected into The Football League, joining the Second Division. The club entered a period of success, winning promotion to the First Division in its first campaign, finishing as runners-up in the 1923–24 season and reaching two FA Cup finals, winning the second in 1927. However, this was followed by a sharp decline as the club suffered successive relegation to the Third Division South by 1932.

The team's struggles also affected the club financially and Wilson was one of several staff members forced to take a pay cut of 20 percent in April 1932. The following year, Fred Stewart resigned from his role as manager after 22 years in charge with Wilson appointed his successor at the age of 63. Wilson appointed former club captain Jimmy Blair as a coach but the club were severely limited financially. His most significant signing ahead of the new season was the return of Ernie Curtis, part of the 1927 FA Cup winning side, for £1,250. Wilson's time in charge proved disastrous and the club was bottom of the Third Division South at the season's mid-point in January. This was followed by five defeats in the following six matches and, on 7 March 1934, Wilson resigned his position to be replaced by Ben Watts-Jones. Wilson instead returned to his administrative role within the club. A Western Mail reporter did however offer support to Wilson, writing that the manager had "been unduly handicapped in his duties because the directors have taken too strong a grip on the managerial side instead of allowing the manager to manage".

To mark his 80th birthday, Wilson was presented with a golden pencil after the club's players, led by Ken Hollyman, pooled money to purchase a gift. Wilson retired in May 1954 having been employed in some capacity by the club he helped found over 50 years previously for 44 years. The board of directors agreed to pay him a wage of £4 a week for the remainder of his life. During his tenure with the club, he had served as first team manager, reserve team manager and secretary in various spells and had also written the club's match reports in the South Wales Echo for a period.

== Personal life ==
Wilson married Sarah Ellen in December 1894 and the following year, the couple moved to 6 Green Street, Riverside, Cardiff. Together they had three children, John Bartley, Alma May, and Donald Bartley. John was killed during World War I while serving with the 17th Welsh Regiment in France. In addition to his job at Cardiff City, Wilson managed a local cricket side during the late 1920s. During World War II, Wilson and his wife were forced to move in with their daughter in Fairwater after their home in De Burgh Street in Cardiff was irreparably damaged by a bombing raid. They eventually purchased a new house in Llanfair Road.

Wilson's wife died in August 1951 and was buried in plot 246 of Western Cemetery in Ely, Cardiff, which Wilson had purchased from Cardiff Council. Wilson died on 19 November 1954 at his home in Llanfair Road, Canton and his funeral, attended by numerous Cardiff City players, was held at St John's Church. He was buried in Western Cemetery next to his wife. His funeral had originally been scheduled for 23 November but was postponed until the following day after torrential rain caused flooding at the site. In the confusion, Wilson's headstone had been placed under a nearby tree and was forgotten after the ceremony was rearranged. His unmarked grave was discovered in December 1998, and Cardiff City initially commissioned a new headstone for the site until the original was discovered in bushes nearby where it had lain for more than 40 years. The original was subsequently renewed by the club and a rededication ceremony was held.

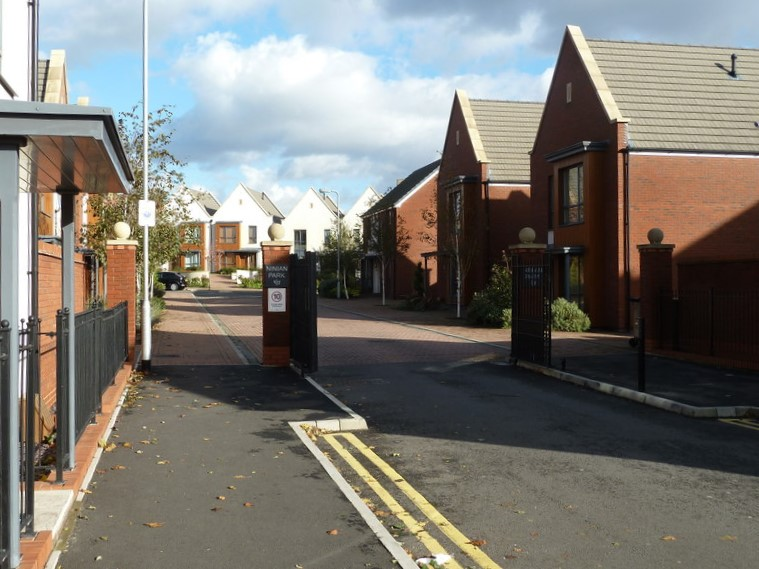
Bartley Wilson Way, on the former site of Ninian Park

== Legacy ==
In 2010, Ninian Park was demolished following Cardiff City's move to a new stadium. A housing estate was built on the site of the old ground with the road being named Bartley Wilson Way in honour of the club's founder.

== Managerial statistics ==
Team	Country	From	To	Record				
Team	Country	From	To	G	W	D	L	Win %
Cardiff City	(Wales)	May 1933	7 March 1934	28	8	4	16	28.57
Total				28	8	4	16	28.57
