= Skills and Volunteering Cymru =

Cardiff-based opportunities charity

Skills and Volunteering Cymru (SVC), formerly Student Volunteering Cardiff, is an independent charity registered in the UK and based in the Cardiff area. SVC offers volunteering opportunities to both students and community members in and around the city of Cardiff working with the elderly, young, disadvantaged, and vulnerable. The mission of SVC is to enhance the lives of disadvantaged and vulnerable members of the local community.

The charity is based on Museum Place in central Cardiff. There are a team of six staff and a Board of Trustees made up of students who study in the city of Cardiff and community members.

== History ==
Student volunteering in Cardiff can be traced back to 1969 when students at Cardiff University became volunteers at Ely Hospital, a hospital for people who had learning disabilities. In 1971, a branch of Student Community Action (SCA) was formed by students of Cardiff University. Students provided support that enabled the people to develop both social and practical skills and gain confidence, and in 1974 went on to start Cardiff University Social Services (CUSS), now Innovate Trust, who set up the first Supported House for people with learning disabilities in the country. CUSS continued to work closely with SCA, who focused its areas of work on disadvantaged adults and children living in Cardiff. In 2001, the opportunity arose for the formation of a partnership between Innovate Trust and SCA. Supported by the University Union and Innovate Trust, and funded by several organisations, the formation of Student Volunteering Cardiff (SVC) allowed the vision of the original students of both organisations to be carried forward to benefit further generations of Cardiff people.

In 2015 SVC moved premises from the Cardiff University Students’ Union, where they were previously based, to 5-7 Museum Place. At this time, SVC also opened up their volunteering opportunities to members of the Cardiff community, as well as students from other universities across Cardiff, in addition to Cardiff University. In 2018 SVC also expanded its volunteering projects to benefit those living in the surrounding areas.
