= St Mary the Virgin Church, Caerau, Cardiff =

Ruined church in Cardiff, Wales

Coordinates: 51.4678°N 3.2466°W

St Mary the Virgin Church

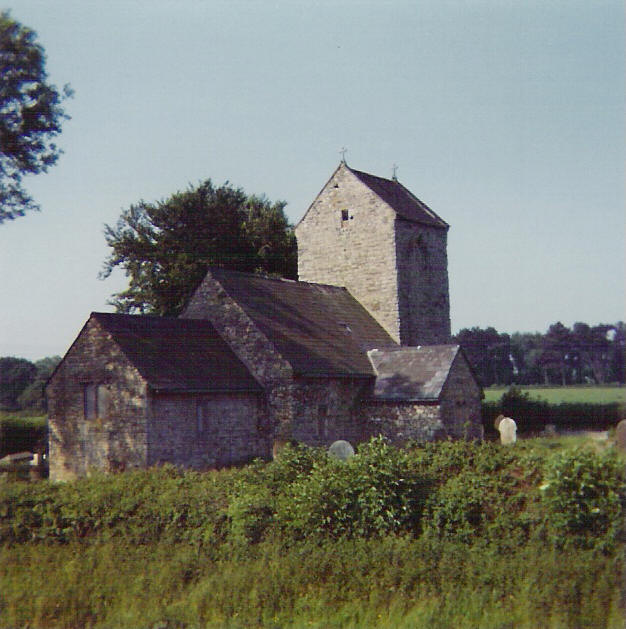
Church before it was deconsecrated in 1971

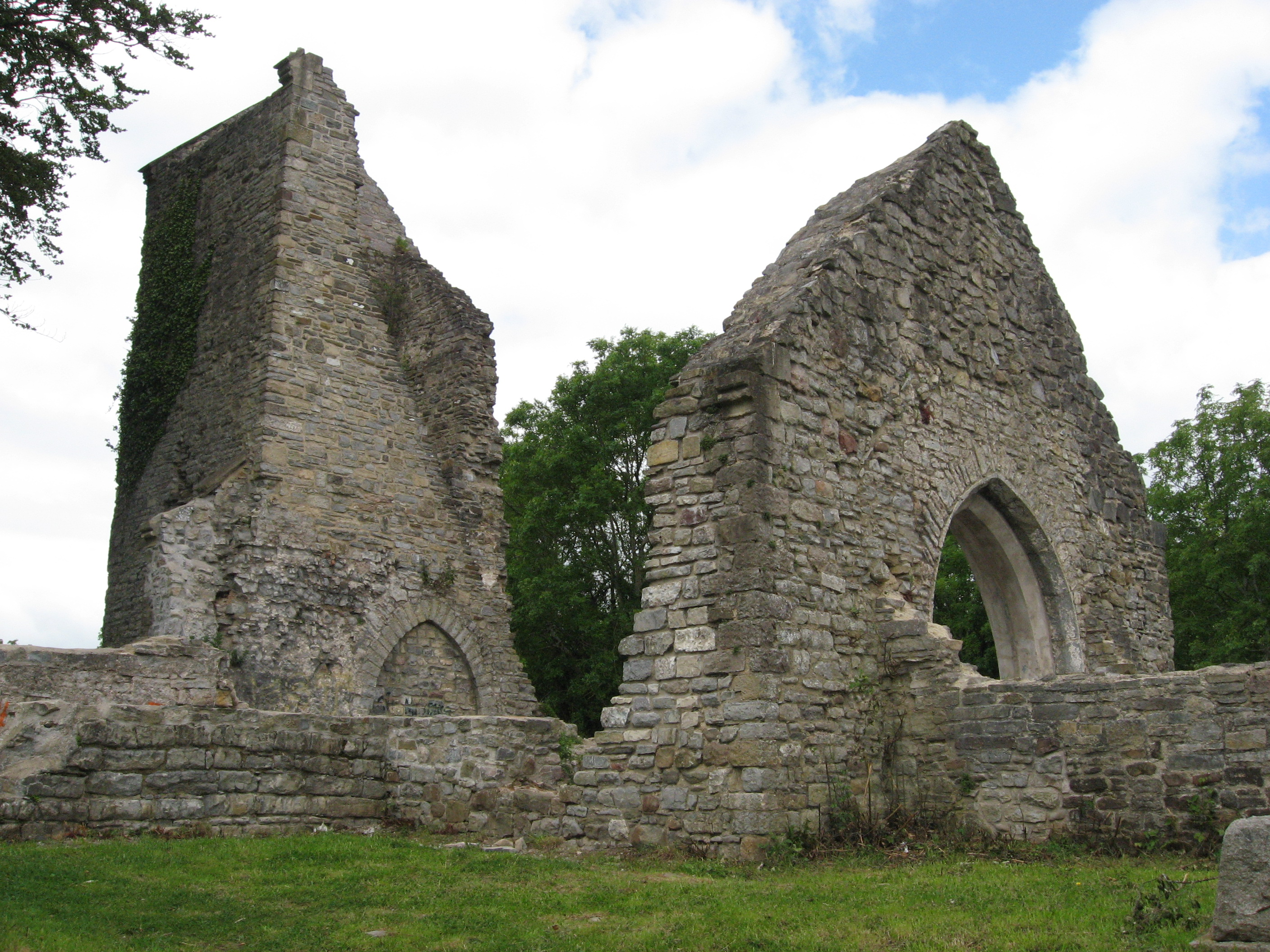
Church in ruins in 2011

St Mary the Virgin Church is a deconsecrated and ruined church in the parish of Caerau with Ely, Cardiff, Wales. It was built in the 13th century on a Roman encampment and closed for the last time in 1973.

== History ==
The ruins of the church stand on the site of Caerau Hillfort on a natural plateau at the Caerau end of a hill range extending from Leckwith to Caerau. The church is first mentioned in the Taxatio Ecclesiasticus of Pope Nicholas IV in 1291 and was probably built in 1260. Since then it has undergone many repairs and alterations. It was substantially rebuilt by the Rev Victor Jones in 1960-61. In 1973 it was closed and deconsecrated and has subsequently deteriorated into a ruin due to continuous vandalism. Since 1999 a group of former and current parishioners, the Friends of St Mary’s Church at Caerau, have been campaigning to preserve and commemorate the remains of the church.

Archaeologia Cambrensis in 1901 describes its 1848 state as follows:

Caerau (St. Mary). September 27, 1848.

A small church on an abrupt eminence, where was a Roman encampment. It consists of a nave and chancel, west tower, and south porch. The tower is small, of rude construction, with pack-saddle roof, having the east and west sides gabled. The belfry windows long and square-headed, and a few other slits for openings, and some traces of a west door. Against the north wall of the tower are some rude steps. On the north side this tower has no opening whatsoever. The porch is large, and entirely vaulted in stone; its doors very plain. On the south side of the nave is a window, formed of two trefoil-headed lights. On the north, near the east end of the nave, a low single, labelled window with trefoil feathering, apparently Third Pointed. The tower opens to the nave by a low Pointed arch. The chancel arch is Pointed and continuous. The chancel has some square-headed windows of two lights, of debased character. The font has a cylindrical bowl on a shaft of like form. On the north side of the nave is a stone bench. The walls are white washed.³

— Archaeologia Cambrensis, 1901, Vol. 1, 6th Series pp 247-248.

The building became Grade II listed in 1980.
