= Ely (Cardiff electoral ward) =

Coordinates: 51.4792°N 3.2497°W

- Electoral ward
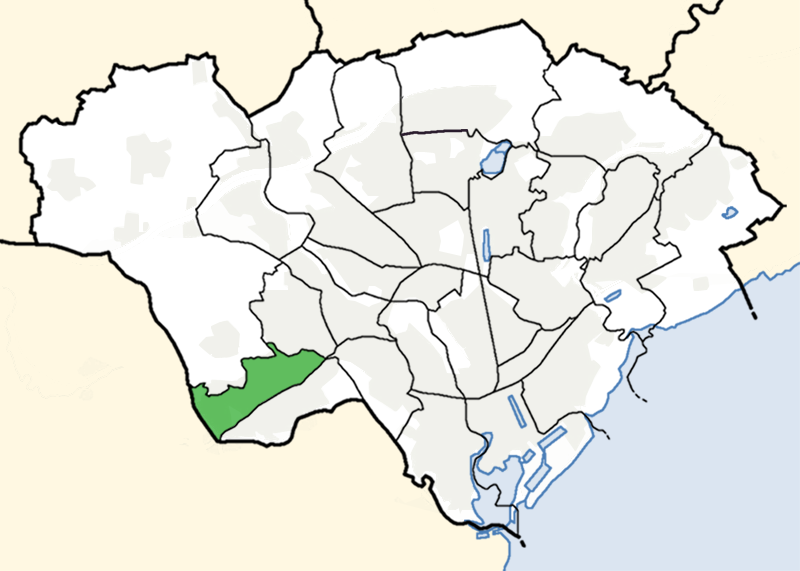
- Location of the Ely ward within Cardiff
- Population: 14,603 (2011 census)
- Community: Ely
- Principal area: Cardiff
- Country: Wales
- Sovereign state: United Kingdom
- UK Parliament: Cardiff West
- Senedd Cymru – Welsh Parliament: Caerdydd Penarth
- Councillors: 3 (Cardiff Council)

Ely is an electoral ward in the west of the city of Cardiff, Wales, which covers Ely, its namesake community. The ward elects three county councillors to the County Council of the City and County of Cardiff. It was represented by the Labour Party, until February 2019 when Plaid Cymru won one of the council seats.

== Description ==
The ward boundaries are coterminous with the community of Ely, north of Cowbridge Road West. To the south is the Caerau ward, to the north are the Creigiau & St. Fagans and Fairwater wards.

According to the 2011 census the population of the ward was 14,603.

== County elections ==
=== 2019 by-election ===
Labour councillor (since 2012) Jim Murphy died in December 2018 aged 72. A by-election was arranged for 21 February 2019 which was won by Andrea Gibson for Plaid Cymru by 52 votes over the Labour candidate, a swing of 18% in comparison with the May 2017 election. The Labour leader of Cardiff Council described it as " a bad day, in a week of absolute political chaos nationally" (referring to the formation of The Independent Group at Westminster).

In October 2019 Councillor Gibson resigned the Plaid Cymru party whip in protest at the treatment of colleague Neil McEvoy. She remained as an independent councillor.

=== Elections 1995 to 2017 ===
The ward had elected three Labour county councillors since 1995, when the new unitary authority was created. Cllr Russell Goodway has been an Ely councillor continuously since 1995 and was leader of Cardiff Council until 2004 (prior to 1995 he was a South Glamorgan councillor for the Canton ward).

2017 Cardiff Council election
Party	Candidate	Votes	%	±%
Labour	Irene Susan Goddard *	1,472	19%	
Labour	James William Murphy *	1,380	18%	
Labour	Russell Vivian Goodway	1,269	16%	
Plaid Cymru	Lowri Brown	786	10%	
Plaid Cymru	Christopher Neil Newth	745	10%	
Plaid Cymru	Andrea Emily Gibson	622	8%	
Conservative	Owen Rhys Robbins	509	7%	
Conservative	Leighton McEwan	507	6%	
Liberal Democrats	Linda Margaret Amoss	267	3%	
Liberal Democrats	Michael Rees	97	1%	
Liberal Democrats	Matthew Hemsley	84	1%	
TUSC	Richard Michael Edwards	64	1%	
Turnout			29%	

* = sitting councillor prior to the election

Councillors Goddard, Murphy and Goodway were also the winners of the May 2012 elections.

At the 2004 elections, the Ely ward's Labour councillor of 30 years, Charlie Gale, stood as an Independent in an attempt to unseat (the then unpopular) Cllr Goodway. Goodway retained his seat by only 63 votes. Goodway immediately stood down as Council leader, but accused senior Labour figures of conspiring against him.

=== 1973-1995 ===
Prior to the formation of the new Cardiff unitary authority, Ely was a ward to Cardiff City Council (a district council of South Glamorgan). Six city councillors were elected at the 1973, 1976 and 1979 elections. This was reduced to three from the 1983 election onwards.

Cllr Bill Buttle was one of the ward's representatives for 23 years, until stepping down in 1991. He was responsible for the Western Leisure Centre being built in Ely. Cllr Charlie Gale was an Ely councillor for 30 years from 1973 before standing as an Independent in 2004.
