= Jason Mohammad =

Welsh radio and TV presenter (born 1973)

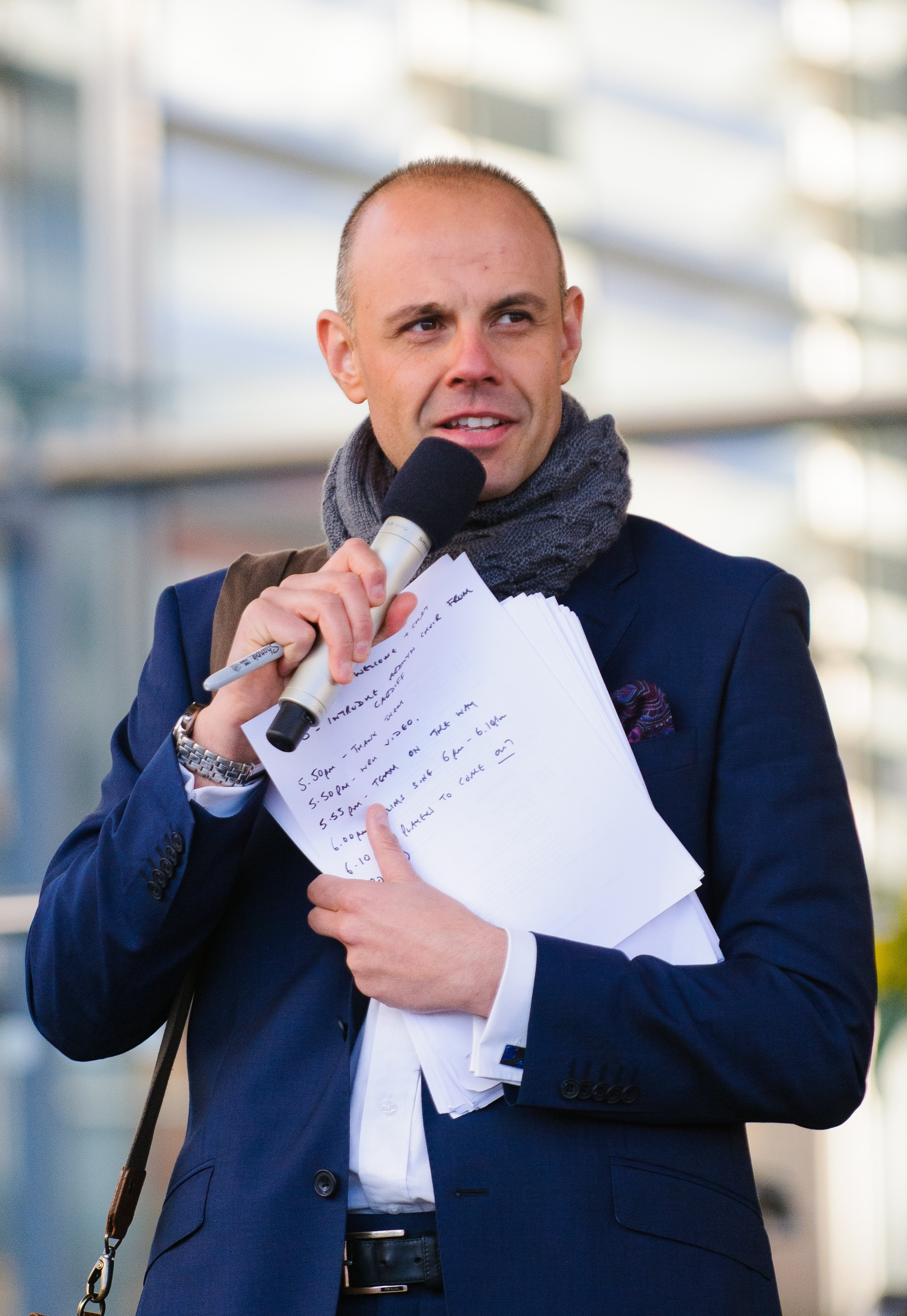
- Mohammad presenting the Wales national rugby union team celebrations for the Grand Slam 2012
- Born: Jason Mohammad; 17 September 1973 (age 53); Cardiff, Wales
- Education: Glyn Derw High School; Swansea University; Cardiff University
- Occupations: Newsreader, radio presenter, television presenter
- Years active: 1996–present
- Notable credit(s): Wales on Saturday; Wales Today; Final Score

Jason Mohammad (born 17 September 1973) is a Welsh radio and television presenter currently working for the BBC. He is the host of a range of programmes for the corporation.

== Personal life ==
Mohammad was born and brought up in Cardiff to a Pakistani father and Welsh mother, going to school at Glyn Derw High School in the Ely district of Cardiff. He studied Welsh and Politics at Swansea University, and then attended Cardiff University for a postgraduate diploma in broadcast journalism. In January 2024, he was appointed as a Pro Chancellor for Cardiff University. He is a practising Muslim.

== Career ==
=== Television ===
Mohammad joined BBC Cymru Wales in 1997 as a reporter for BBC Wales Today before becoming the anchor of Wales on Saturday. In 2013, he replaced Gabby Logan as the host of Final Score on BBC One on Saturday afternoons, regularly hosting alongside pundits such as Garth Crooks and Danny Mills. Mohammad had previously been a reporter on the programme for many years. He was also the presenter of Scrum V specials on BBC Two Wales and was the secondary snooker presenter for BBC Sport. Mohammad was part of the BBC's broadcasting crew at the Rio 2016 Summer Olympics and is an occasional presenter of Match of the Day and Match of the Day 2, deputising for Gary Lineker and Mark Chapman respectively. He previously hosted some of the BBC's live coverage of the RBS Six Nations, although they now share the live rights with ITV, leaving John Inverdale and Gabby Logan to present the live action.

For the London 2012 Olympics, Mohammad was a reporter for the BBC, a role he took up again for the Sochi 2014 Games. For the Rio 2016 Games, Mohammad presented overnight action of the evening's events. For the delayed Tokyo 2020 Games, Mohammad anchored afternoon action, broadcasting the last of the day's events and highlights.

At the Glasgow 2014 Commonwealth Games, Mohammad fronted daytime coverage of events for the BBC. For the Gold Coast 2018 Games, Mohammad once again presented coverage of events throughout the day. For the Birmingham 2022 Games, Mohammad presented morning coverage alongside Holly Hamilton.

In March 2025, Mohammad hosted the first broadcast of Eid al-Fitr prayers on British terrestrial television, from Bradford Central Mosque.

=== Radio ===
Before getting his break into the world of journalism, Jason was a member of Radio City 1386AM, The Abertawe Bro Morgannwg University Health Board radio service based in Singleton Hospital. Mohammad hosts a show on Monday to Wednesday afternoons on BBC Radio Wales. In October 2017 he sat in for Clare Balding on her BBC Radio 2 show Good Morning Sunday. From the start of the 2016–17 football season, Mohammad has been the co-host of BBC Radio 5 Live's football phone in show 606, alongside regular co-host Robbie Savage. He is also an occasional presenter of 5 Live Sport.
From 4 February 2018, he became the regular co-presenter of Good Morning Sunday on Radio 2, alongside Kate Bottley.

=== Remuneration ===
On 3 July 2019, the BBC disclosed that Jason Mohammad was paid £355,000 in the previous year, among the top ten earners at the BBC.
