= 1976 Cardiff City Council election =

Local election in Cardiff, Wales

The 1976 Cardiff City Council election was held on Thursday 6 May 1976 to elect councillors to Cardiff District Council (later to become known as Cardiff City Council) in Cardiff, Wales. It took place on the same day as other district council elections in the United Kingdom. This was the second election to the district council.

The previous Cardiff City Council elections took place in 1973 and the next full elections took place in 1979.

The 1976 election saw the Labour Party lose their majority to the Conservative Party.

== Background ==
206 Candidates from 6 parties ran. No party ran a full slate of candidates. The Conservative Party ran 73 candidates, the Labour Party ran 69 candidates, Plaid Cymru ran 33 candidates and the Liberal Party ran 21 candidates.

== Results ==
Contests took place in all except one of the wards at this election.

Cardiff District Council election result 1976
Party	Seats	Gains	Losses	Net gain/loss	Seats %	Votes %	Votes	+/−
Conservative	44	13	2	+11	58.7			
Labour	29	0	13	-13	38.7			
Ratepayers	2	+2	0	+2	2.6			
Liberal	0	0	0	±0.0	0.0			
Plaid Cymru	0	0	0	±0.0	0.0			
Communist	0	0	0	±0.0	0.0			

== Results by ward ==
=== Adamsdown (3 seats) ===
Adamsdown
Party	Candidate	Votes	%	±%
Labour	D. Evans	1,116	59.9	−14.3
Labour	R Costley	996		
Labour	I. Jones	992		
Conservative	B. Jones	747	40.1	+20.2
Conservative	D. Jones	586		
Turnout			33.4	+8.1
Registered electors		5,573		
Labour hold		Swing		
Labour hold		Swing		
Labour hold		Swing		

=== Canton (3 seats) ===
Canton
Party	Candidate	Votes	%	±%
Conservative	Bella Brown	1,901	62.4	+12.8
Conservative	Trevor Tyrell	1,628		
Conservative	D. Davey	1,483		
Labour	N. Jenkins	1,146	37.6	−12.8
Labour	P. W. Thomas	1,126		
Labour	R. Bassett	0		
Plaid Cymru	R. Lee	0	0.0	N/A
Turnout			42.8	+8.0
Registered electors		7,115		
Conservative gain from Labour		Swing		
Conservative hold		Swing		
Conservative gain from Labour		Swing		

=== Cathays (3 seats) ===
Cathays
Party	Candidate	Votes	%	±%
Labour	Derek Allinson	1,529	30.4	−14.2
Conservative	L. Jones	1,419	28.2	+1.0
Labour	John Edwards	1,390		
Labour	J. Davies	1,366		
Conservative	M. Keigwyn	1,329		
Conservative	D. Thomas	1,248		
Ratepayers	R. Castle	1,046	20.8	N/A
Ratepayers	G. Parsons	900		
Ratepayers	V. Kempton	834		
Liberal	Mike German	593	11.8	−4.3
Liberal	J. Roberts	531		
Liberal	G. Snell	467		
Plaid Cymru	T. O'Neill	448	12.1	−3.2
Plaid Cymru	D. Thomas	403		
Plaid Cymru	B. Smith	352		
Turnout			39.5	+14.8
Registered electors		9,268		
Labour hold		Swing		
Conservative gain from Labour		Swing		
Labour hold		Swing		

=== Central (3 seats) ===
Central
Party	Candidate	Votes	%	±%
Labour	Gordon Fish	1,010	37.5	−24.7
Labour	William Herbert	1,209		
Conservative	D. Marles	946	35.2	−2.6
Conservative	G. Scott-Dickens	928		
Labour	David Seligman	870		
Conservative	C. Thomas	850		
Ratepayers	D. Guy	487	18.1	N/A
Plaid Cymru	D. O'Neill	247	9.2	N/A
Liberal	P. Davies	0	0.0	N/A
Plaid Cymru	P. Riley	0	0.0	
Plaid Cymru	D. Hopkins	0	0.0	
Turnout			47.9	+14.5
Registered electors		5,620		
Labour hold		Swing		
Labour hold		Swing		
Conservative gain from Labour		Swing		

=== Ely (6 seats) ===
Ely
Party	Candidate	Votes	%	±%
Labour	William Carling	2,362	53.0	−14.3
Labour	M. Buttle	2,458		
Labour	Reverend Robert Morgan	2,402		
Labour	Thomas Lee	2,258		
Labour	J. Sloman	2,218		
Labour	Charlie Gale	2,218		
Conservative	W. Clode	1,745	36.9	+14.4
Conservative	A. Fitzpatrick	1,602		
Conservative	F. Phillips	1,596		
Conservative	M. Jones	1,557		
Conservative	M. Warren	1,545		
Conservative	R. Wheeler	1,464		
Plaid Cymru	G. Dowling	479	10.1	−0.1
Plaid Cymru	J. Syms	416		
Plaid Cymru	E. Maynard	346		
Plaid Cymru	J. Storn	333		
Turnout			32.9	+8.7
Registered electors		14,405		
Labour hold		Swing		
Labour hold		Swing		
Labour hold		Swing		
Labour hold		Swing		
Labour hold		Swing		
Labour hold		Swing		

=== Gabalfa (3 seats) ===
Gabalfa
Party	Candidate	Votes	%	±%
Conservative	M. Kingwell	2,184	45.9	+12.1
Labour	Michael Parry	2,043	43.0	−23.2
Conservative	T. Merridew	1,989		
Labour	Emrys Pride	1,971		
Conservative	G. Tatham	1,795		
Labour	Arthur Brown	1,736		
Plaid Cymru	G. Doyle	528	11.1	N/A
Plaid Cymru	C. Schoen	402		
Turnout			49.0	+23.9
Registered electors		9,707		
Conservative gain from Labour		Swing		
Labour hold		Swing		
Conservative gain from Labour		Swing		

=== Grangetown (3 seats) ===
Grangetown
Party	Candidate	Votes	%	±%
Conservative	J. O'Reilly	1,737	57.0	+9.0
Conservative	B. Moorcraft	1,671		
Conservative	Gwendoline Judd	1,647		
Labour	M. Matthewson	1,309	43.0	−9.0
Labour	D. Lydiard	1,280		
Labour	Harold Bartlett	1,233		
Turnout			41.8	+8.7
Registered electors		7,279		
Conservative gain from Labour		Swing		
Conservative gain from Labour		Swing		
Conservative gain from Labour		Swing		

=== Lisvane, Llanedeyrn and St Mellons (1 seat) ===
Lisvane, Llanedeyrn and St Mellons
Party	Candidate	Votes	%	±%
Conservative	T. Davies	1,127	88.7	N/A
Liberal	C. Mitchell	144	11.3	N/A
Turnout			41.8	N/A
Registered electors		1,735		
Conservative hold		Swing		

=== Llandaff (3 seats) ===
Llandaff
Party	Candidate	Votes	%	±%
Conservative	B. Jones	2,998	67.1	+8.1
Conservative	J. Hermer	2,922		
Conservative	H. Jones	2,838		
Plaid Cymru	Anne-Marie Petty	760	20.1	−3.1
Labour	A. Saunders	711	15.9	−5.0
Labour	J. Leno	702		
Turnout			49.1	+15.7
Registered electors		9,099		
Conservative hold		Swing		
Conservative hold		Swing		
Conservative hold		Swing		

=== Llanishen (6 seats) ===
Llanishen
Party	Candidate	Votes	%	±%
Conservative	Jeffrey Sainsbury	3,660	35.4	−1.1
Conservative	Ronald Watkiss	3,652		
Conservative	D. O'Neill	3,648		
Conservative	Lionel Pugh	3,636		
Conservative	N. Morgan	3,476		
Ratepayers	C. Milsom	3,339	32.3	N/A
Conservative	William Barraby	3,318		
Liberal	O. Langdon	1,307	12.6	N/A
Labour	T. Morris	1,173	11.3	−14.1
Labour	M. Walker	1,122		
Labour	P. Phillips	1,113		
Plaid Cymru	R. Edwards	856	8.3	−2.4
Plaid Cymru	S. Doyle	807		
Turnout			78.1	+28.4
Registered electors		13,239		
Conservative hold		Swing		
Conservative hold		Swing		
Conservative hold		Swing		
Conservative hold		Swing		
Conservative hold		Swing		
Ratepayers gain from Conservative		Swing		

=== Penylan (6 seats) ===
Penylan
Party	Candidate	Votes	%	±%
Conservative	Stefan Terlezki	7,244	65.3	+15.3
Conservative	L. Gower	6,974		
Conservative	M. Newman	6,893		
Conservative	A. Austin	6,886		
Conservative	G. Turnbull	6,876		
Conservative	A. Thomas	6,571		
Liberal	T. Thomas	1,570	14.1	−19.2
Labour	M. Jones	1,551	14.0	−2.7
Labour	P. Wing	1,541		
Labour	K. O'Brien	1,528		
Labour	R. Pound	1,491		
Labour	G. Bayliss	1,477		
Labour	K. Gaskell	1,152		
Liberal	P. Lindsey	1,129		
Liberal	R. Crowley	1,106		
Liberal	B. Jones	1,063		
Liberal	D. Hill	970		
Liberal	R. Ashford	924		
Plaid Cymru	K. Bush	733	6.6	N/A
Plaid Cymru	E. Bush	731		
Plaid Cymru	A. Couch	730		
Plaid Cymru	H. Phillips	712		
Plaid Cymru	P. Cravos	704		
Plaid Cymru	S. Price	672		
Turnout			48.6	+7.9
Registered electors		22,826		
Conservative hold		Swing		
Conservative hold		Swing		
Conservative hold		Swing		
Conservative hold		Swing		
Conservative hold		Swing		
Conservative hold		Swing		

=== Plasmawr (6 seats) ===
Plasmawr
Party	Candidate	Votes	%	±%
Labour	Albert Huish	2,068	39.4	−18.0
Conservative	W. Hall	2,047	39.0	+14.0
Conservative	F. Lloyd	2,017		
Labour	H. Davies	1,996		
Conservative	D. Pepler	1,993		
Labour	M. Phillips	1,976		
Labour	F. Tyrrell	1,958		
Conservative	L. Skye	1,908		
Conservative	B. Pearce	1,888		
Labour	J. Leonard	1,878		
Conservative	D. McIntyre	1,870		
Labour	B. Shorten	1,859		
Plaid Cymru	D. Davies	1,131	21.6	+4.0
Turnout			37.2	+12.4
Registered electors		14,094		
Labour hold		Swing		
Conservative gain from Labour		Swing		
Conservative gain from Labour		Swing		
Labour hold		Swing		
Conservative gain from Labour		Swing		
Labour hold		Swing		

=== Plasnewydd (3 seats) ===
Plasnewydd
Party	Candidate	Votes	%	±%
Conservative	D. Watkins	1,901	40.2	+9.5
Conservative	S. James	1,874		
Conservative	D. Evans	1,807		
Labour	P. Norton	897	25.7	−2.2
Labour	J. Truran	857		
Labour	J. Bonar	809		
Plaid Cymru	Owen John Thomas	674	17.6	−0.7
Plaid Cymru	M. Coughlin	611		
Plaid Cymru	R. Griffiths	571		
Liberal	G. German	260	6.8	−9.0
Liberal	P. Jarman	239		
Liberal	A. Verma	188		
Communist	J. Roxburgh	92	2.4	N/A
Turnout			46.2	−0.3
Registered electors		8,275		
Conservative hold		Swing		
Conservative hold		Swing		
Conservative hold		Swing		

=== Radyr, St Fagans, Tongwynlais (2 seats) ===
Radyr, St Fagans, Tongwynlais
Party	Candidate	Votes	%	±%
Conservative	L. Clarke	Unopposed		
Conservative	G. Millard	Unopposed		
Turnout		0	0.0	N/A
Registered electors		4,590		
Conservative hold		Swing		
Conservative hold		Swing		

=== Rhiwbina (3 seats) ===
Rhiwbina
Party	Candidate	Votes	%	±%
Conservative	William Bain	3,372	58.8	+18.1
Conservative	Martin Davies	3,359		
Conservative	G. Jones	3,222		
Liberal	H. J. O'Brien	986	17.2	−15.1
Liberal	O. Davies	793		
Plaid Cymru	K. Davies	694	14.7	−2.6
Labour	C. Beech	678	11.8	−0.5
Liberal	G. White	676		
Labour	E. Woolfe	628		
Plaid Cymru	B. Williams	582		
Labour	R. Armstrong	572		
Plaid Cymru	N. Davies	552		
Turnout			54.7	+8.2
Registered electors		10,482		
Conservative hold		Swing		
Conservative hold		Swing		
Conservative hold		Swing		

=== Riverside (3 seats) ===
Riverside
Party	Candidate	Votes	%	±%
Conservative	K. Davies	1,565	39.6	−8.1
Ratepayers	L. Mathias	1,254	31.7	N/A
Conservative	S. Doxsey	1,253		
Conservative	Alec Johnson	1,150		
Ratepayers	P. Powell	941		
Labour	A. Dixon	746	18.9	−10.6
Labour	D. Toogood	588		
Labour	K. Mullins	573		
Plaid Cymru	G. Petty	392	9.0	−0.6
Plaid Cymru	J. Kuczy's	337		
Turnout			54.4	+12.0
Registered electors		7,276		
Conservative hold		Swing		
Ratepayers gain from Conservative		Swing		
Conservative hold		Swing		

=== Roath (3 seats) ===
Roath
Party	Candidate	Votes	%	±%
Conservative	N. Lloyd-Edwards	3,062	59.0	+10.0
Conservative	Gerald Brinks	2,706		
Conservative	R. Richards	1,636		
Labour	T. Tucker	886	17.1	±0.0
Plaid Cymru	G. Bowman	645	12.4	+3.7
Liberal	J. McWilliam	594	11.5	−13.7
Liberal	P. Verma	318		
Turnout			42.0	+6.2
Registered electors		10,348		
Conservative hold		Swing		
Conservative hold		Swing		
Conservative hold		Swing		

=== Rumney (6 seats) ===
Rumney
Party	Candidate	Votes	%	±%
Labour	N. Llewellyn	2,980	52.7	+6.3
Labour	V. Jones	2,843		
Labour	Alun Michael	2,747		
Labour	John Phillips	2,693		
Labour	John Reynolds	2,685		
Labour	F. Yeomans	2,681		
Conservative	C. Nicholson	2,513	31.5	−1.2
Conservative	R. Mitchell	2,502		
Ratepayers	R. Potter	2,497	31.3	N/A
Conservative	L. Quinn	2,409		
Conservative	J. Wright	2,397		
Conservative	L. Hunt	2,366		
Turnout			42.0	+15.3
Registered electors		19,033		
Labour hold		Swing		
Labour hold		Swing		
Labour hold		Swing		
Labour hold		Swing		
Labour hold		Swing		
Labour hold		Swing		

=== South (3 seats) ===
South
Party	Candidate	Votes	%	±%
Labour	J. Smith	1,387	56.1	−4.7
Labour	Philip Dunleavy	1,363		
Labour	P. Bowen	1,230		
Conservative	E. Williams	1,084	43.9	+4.7
Conservative	E. Canning	1,061		
Conservative	S. Cooper	1,033		
Turnout			38.3	+1.0
Registered electors		6,447		
Labour hold		Swing		
Labour hold		Swing		
Labour hold		Swing		

=== Splott (3 seats) ===
Splott
Party	Candidate	Votes	%	±%
Labour	R. Ormonde	1,483	41.9	−24.0
Labour	C. Williams	1,325		
Labour	L. Bonar	1,136		
Conservative	T. Kelly	1,015	28.7	+1.3
Conservative	F. Chichester	968		
Ratepayers	R. Warburton	887	25.1	N/A
Conservative	K. Wilcox	876		
Communist	S. Garrett-Jones	151	4.3	−2.4
Turnout			47.5	+15.0
Registered electors		7,437		
Labour hold		Swing		
Labour hold		Swing		
Labour hold		Swing		

=== Whitchurch (3 seats) ===
Whitchurch
Party	Candidate	Votes	%	±%
Conservative	David Purnell	3,688	50.3	±0.0
Conservative	Victor Riley	3,526		
Conservative	T. Davies	3,429		
Labour	G. Howell	1,432	19.5	−30.2
Labour	R. Bowler	1,388		
Plaid Cymru	E. Ogwen	1,366	18.6	N/A
Labour	P. Owen	1,360		
Liberal	S. Davies	846	11.5	N/A
Liberal	S. Sofia	492		
Turnout			70.3	+19.9
Registered electors		10,437		
Conservative hold		Swing		
Conservative gain from Labour		Swing		
Conservative hold		Swing		
