= Caerau Hillfort =

Hillfort in Cardiff, Wales

Coordinates: 51.4672°N 3.2483°W

Embankment of the Caerau Hillfort

Caurau Hillfort, on the south-western edge of Cardiff.
The Neolithic enclosure features are shown in red, crossing the ridge within the later Iron Age hill fort whose ramparts are shown in grey. The medieval Church and ringwork at the eastern end of the hill are shown as blue features.

Caerau Hillfort (Welsh: Bryngaer Caerau) is a large triangular multivallate Iron Age hillfort, built on a previously occupied Neolithic site, occupying the western tip of an extensive ridge-top plateau in the western suburbs of Caerau and Ely, Cardiff, Wales. It is the largest Iron Age site of its type in south Wales and also one of the largest in Great Britain. The old parish church, St Mary's, and a small ringwork, almost certainly a medieval castle site probably contemporary with the church, stand within the hillfort on the north-eastern side.

== The hillfort ==
Caerau Hillfort is the third largest Iron Age hillfort in Glamorgan, enclosing 5.1 hectares (13 acres), and is surrounded by housing and the A4232. It was once a stronghold of the powerful Silures tribe who inhabited this part of Wales before the arrival of the Romans.

Excavations for an episode of Channel 4's Time Team, broadcast in April 2012, showed the hillfort's occupation began about 600 BC. Further excavations, in 2013–2014, revealed evidence of the site's occupation back to the early Neolithic. Finds included flint tools and weapons dating to 3600 BC. Iron Age and Romano-British pottery as well as a single fragment of a mortarium (1st century AD Roman pouring vessel) have been found from an area north-west of the southern entrance.

The steep north and south slopes of the ridge are both fortified by three massive ramparts with accompanying ditches, although these are hidden beneath trees and scrub. On the east side the hillfort defences appear to have been reduced to two ramparts in the north and one in south. There seem to have been two entrances to the hillfort, one in the middle of the east side and one west of the south corner. At the east entrance the ramparts curve round to command the approach, but there is no corresponding in turn at the south entrance. An apex in the north-west of the hillfort may be a third entrance, but it has been heavily eroded by water flowing from a spring.

The interior, now pasture, was cultivated in the past, and the characteristic traces of rig and furrow agriculture can be seen on aerial photographs. It is traversed by two earthworks which may be old field boundaries, or even the remains of a smaller, earlier hillfort or even a Neolithic causewayed enclosure.

== St Mary's church ==
St Mary's church

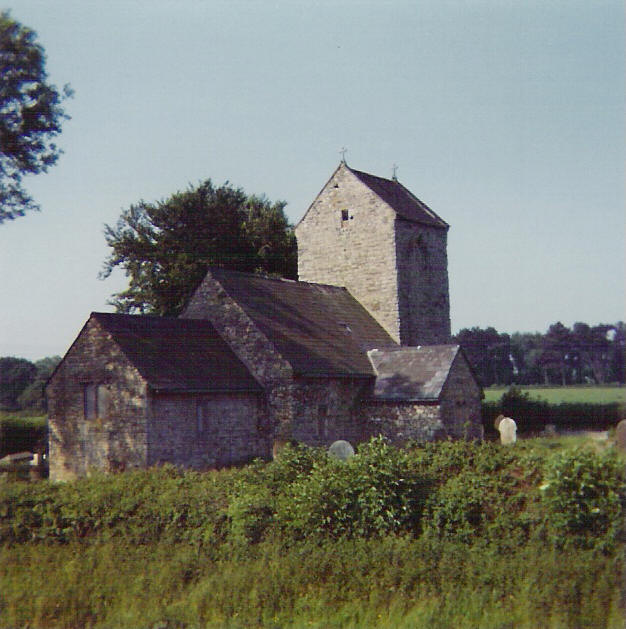
The church before it was deconsecrated in 1971

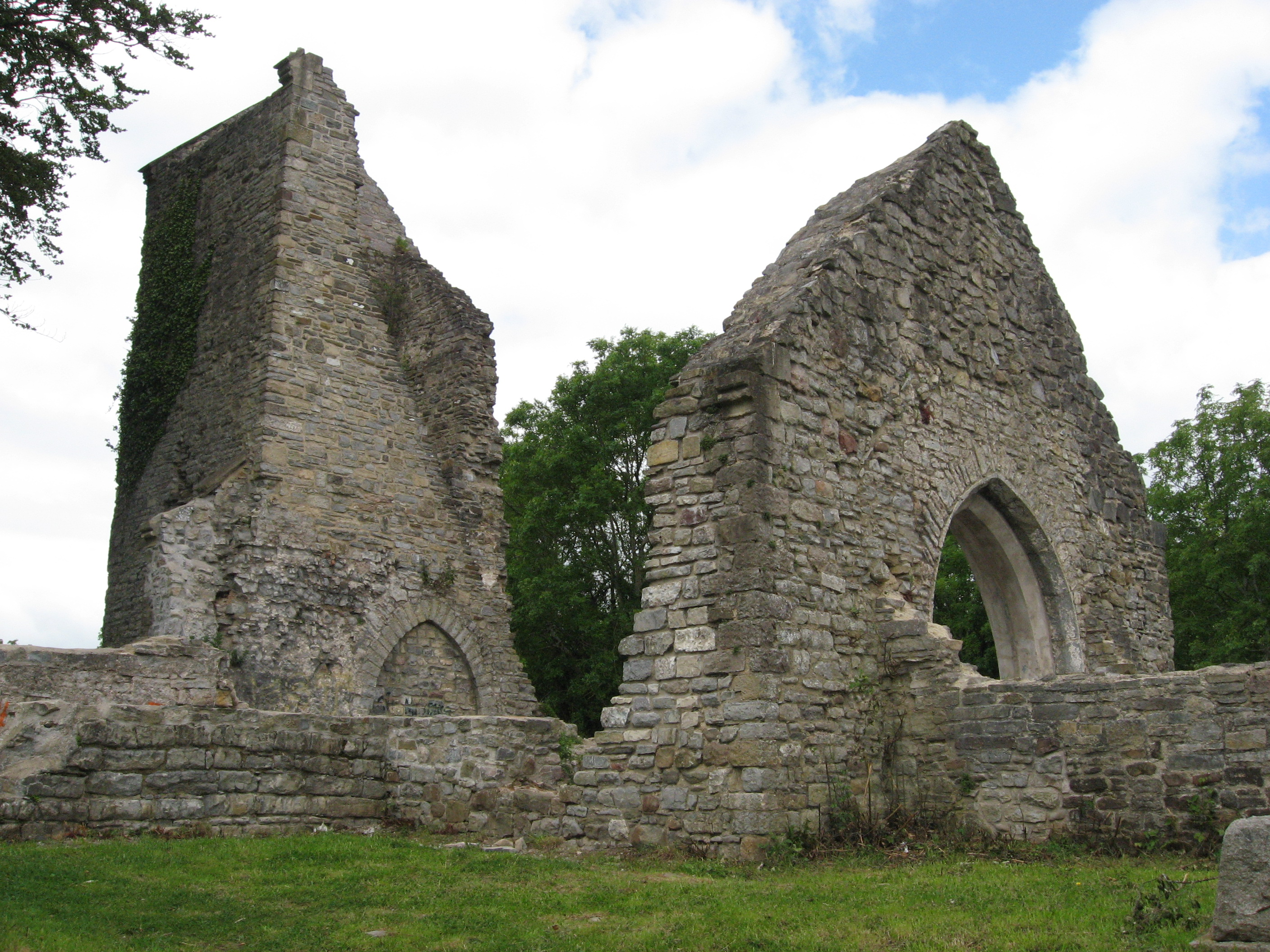
The church in ruins in 2011

St Mary's church probably dates to the 13th century, and is set within an oval churchyard. Today, it is ruinous and consists of stone walls, mostly stone rubble, nave with south porch and north vestry, chancel and a tower. St Mary's was restored c. 1885 by John Prichard, the Llandaff diocesan architect, who rebuilt the chancel, while the vestry was added in c. 1920. The church was closed in 1957 and allowed to fall into ruin, but was again restored in 1961 by Father Victor Jones. After Father Jones left the diocese, the church was again allowed to fall into disrepair.

== The ringwork ==
To the north-east of St Mary’s church is an oval medieval ringwork measuring 35 m by 20 m. The oval enclosure is defined by a rampart and ditch with an entrance facing southwest towards St Mary's church. It is possible that it is an unrecorded castle belonging to the Bishops of Llandaff, probably contemporary with the church.

== See also ==
- History of Cardiff
- Timeline of Cardiff history
- History of Wales
- List of scheduled monuments in Cardiff
