= Mahmood Hussein Mattan =

Somali man wrongfully convicted of murder

- Mahmood Hussein Mattan
- Born: 1923; British Somaliland
- Died: 3 September 1952 (aged 28); HMP Cardiff, Wales
- Resting place: Western Cemetery, Cardiff; 51°28′15″N 3°15′58″W
- Citizenship: British subject
- Spouse: Laura Mattan (née Williams)
- Status: Executed by hanging (1952); Conviction quashed (1998)
- Conviction: Murder (vacated)
- Penalty: Death

Mahmood Hussein Mattan (1923 – 3 September 1952) was a Somali former merchant seaman who was wrongfully convicted, in the United Kingdom, of the murder of Lily Volpert on 6 March 1952. The murder took place in the Docklands area of Cardiff, Wales, and Mattan was mainly convicted on the evidence of a single prosecution witness. Mattan was executed in 1952.

His conviction was quashed 45 years later on 24 February 1998, his case being the first to be referred to the Court of Appeal by the newly formed Criminal Cases Review Commission.

== Early life ==
Mahmood Hussein Mattan was born in British Somaliland in 1923 and his job as a merchant seaman took him to Wales where he settled in Tiger Bay in the docks district of Cardiff. There he met Laura Williams, a worker at a paper factory. The couple married just three months after meeting. As a multiracial couple they suffered racist abuse from the community.

The couple had three children, but in 1950 they separated and afterwards lived in separate houses on the same street. Mattan had left the merchant navy in 1949, and by 1952 had done various jobs, including working in a steel foundry.

== Conviction for murder ==
=== Murder and investigation ===
Lily Volpert, a 42-year-old woman who owned a general outfitter's shop in the Cardiff Docklands area, was murdered on the evening of 6 March 1952. After closing the shop at around 8.05 p.m., she was about to have supper with her family in the back room when the doorbell rang. Her sister and mother saw a man outside the shop door and Lily went to deal with him. A few minutes later her niece saw her talking to an apparently different man at the door. Soon afterwards her body was found in the shop by another customer. Her throat had been cut with a razor or sharp knife, and it seemed that at least £100 (equivalent to £2,505 in 2025) had been stolen.

The Cardiff City Police investigated a number of local men, including Mattan. About two hours after the murder two detectives visited his lodgings and questioned him. They searched his room but discovered nothing suspicious. There was no evidence of any blood-stained clothing, the missing money or anything that could have been the murder weapon. Later, other witnesses contradicted Mattan's alibi and the police interrogated him at length, and organised an identification parade attended by Lily Volpert's sister, mother and niece, but they did not identify him.

They also questioned two women, Mary Tolley and Margaret Bush, who had been at the shop immediately before it closed. They gave detailed statements but did not mention having seen anyone else in the shop. After Mattan had come under suspicion, they were shown a photograph of him and they said they knew him by sight but had not seen him for about a month. But following further intensive questioning, Mary Tolley made another statement in which she said Mattan had come into the shop while they were there and had then left. But her companion, Margaret Bush, still said she had seen no one there. Mattan was arrested immediately after this and on the following day, ten days after the crime, he was charged with Lily Volpert's murder.

Mary Tolley later made a further statement in which she said she had not seen Mattan leave the shop. The police suggested that Mattan had hidden and murdered Lily Volpert immediately after the two women had left. They suppressed Tolley's earlier detailed statement which had not mentioned anyone being there. They also suppressed the original statements of Lily's family, which implied that she had been seen at the door twice after that. They then argued that this had happened earlier, before the women arrived.

=== Committal proceedings ===
The prosecution case was presented at the committal proceedings in Cardiff magistrates' court on 16–18 April. Beforehand, the police confronted Mattan with another witness, a 12-year-old girl who had called at the shop at around 8 p.m. and had seen a dark-skinned man nearby. But she said Mattan was not the man she had seen. During the hearing, Mary Tolley changed her evidence again, failing to identify Mattan as the man who had come into the shop. But another witness, Harold Cover, a Jamaican with a history of violence, did identify him. He had walked past the shop around the time of the murder and had seen two Somalis outside. One was walking out of the porch and the other - a six-foot-tall man - was standing near the door. In court he said the first man was Mattan. In fact, he had earlier identified the first man as another Somali living in the area at the time, Tahir Gass, but this did not become publicly known until 1998. The outcome was that Mattan was committed for trial.

=== Trial ===
The trial took place at the Glamorgan Assizes in Swansea on 22–24 July 1952 before Mr Justice Ormerod and a jury. Harold Cover was the main prosecution witness. Another witness, May Gray, gave evidence that she had seen Mattan with a wad of banknotes soon after the murder. But Mattan's counsel suggested she was lying and motivated by a reward of £200 (equivalent to £5,010 in 2025) that had been offered by the Volpert family, of which Cover later received part. Evidence was also presented that microscopic specks of blood had been found on a pair of Mattan's shoes. But the shoes had been reclaimed from a salvage dump and there was no scientific evidence linking the blood to the murder. Although Mary Tolley gave evidence, the jury was not told that other witnesses had failed to identify Mattan.

Mattan's barrister succeeded in having a large part of the prosecution evidence ruled inadmissible because of the restrictions that then existed on questioning suspects in custody. But in his closing speech he described his client as "Half-child of nature; half, semi-civilised savage". These comments may have prejudiced the jury and undermined Mattan's defence. Mattan was convicted of the murder of Lily Volpert and the judge passed the mandatory sentence of death.

=== Execution ===
Mattan was refused leave to appeal and to call further evidence in August 1952, and the Home Secretary decided he would not be reprieved. On 3 September 1952, six months after the murder of Volpert, he was hanged at Cardiff Prison. He was the last person to be hanged at the prison.

== Subsequent events ==
In 1954 Tahir Gass, the man seen outside Lily Volpert's shop by Harold Cover, was convicted of murdering wages clerk Granville Jenkins in a country lane near Newport, Monmouthshire. Jenkins had been stabbed to death in a frenzied attack. At Gass's trial, medical evidence was presented that he was suffering from schizophrenia and was delusional. He was found to be insane and sent to Broadmoor, but less than a year later he was discharged and repatriated to the protectorate of British Somaliland, later part of Somalia and now Somaliland.

In 1969 Harold Cover was convicted of the attempted murder of his daughter in Cardiff, by cutting her throat with an open razor, and sentenced to life imprisonment.

In 1996 Mattan's remains were removed from the grounds of Cardiff Prison (which his widow had been unable to visit) and reburied in the Muslim section of Western Cemetery in Ely, Cardiff.

Mattan's middle son, Omar, was found dead on a Scottish beach in 2003, and an open verdict was returned. In July 2006, his youngest son, Mervyn Edward Mattan, known as Eddie, was sentenced to six months imprisonment for his part in a failed bank robbery. Mervyn Mattan died in June 2011, and was discovered at his home by a former girlfriend surrounded by several empty bottles of sherry. In October 2012, a coroner's inquest returned a verdict of death by dependence on alcohol.

Laura Mattan died at the Royal Gwent Hospital in Newport on 1 January 2008, aged 78.

== Posthumous appeal ==
The first attempt to overturn Mattan's conviction came in 1969 after Harold Cover's conviction for attempted murder had raised concerns about the case in Cardiff. But the Home Secretary James Callaghan decided not to reopen the case. By this stage, three years had passed since the death penalty's abolition.

In 1996 the family was given permission to have Mattan's body exhumed and moved from a felon's grave at the prison to be buried in consecrated ground in a Cardiff cemetery. His tombstone says: "KILLED BY INJUSTICE."

When the Criminal Cases Review Commission was set up in the mid 1990s, Mattan's case was the first to be referred by it. On 24 February 1998 the Court of Appeal came to the judgement that the original case was, in the words of Lord Justice Rose, "demonstrably flawed". The family were awarded £725,000 compensation, to be shared equally among Mattan's wife and three children. The compensation was the first award to a family for a person wrongfully hanged.

On 3 September 2022, the 70th anniversary of Mattan's execution, it was announced that South Wales Police, which the former Cardiff City Police is now part of, had issued an apology to Mattan's family, admitting that the prosecution was flawed.

== In popular culture ==
Nadifa Mohamed's novel The Fortune Men (2021) is based on the murder of Lily Volpert and the trial and execution of Mahmood Hussein Mattan. It was shortlisted for the 2021 Booker Prize.

In 2022 actor and writer author Danielle Fahiya presented, wrote and produced BBC Sounds Mattan: Injustice of a hanged man. It was included in The Financial Times best podcasts list of 2022.

== Bibliography ==
- Roy Davies, Crogi ar Gam? Hanes Llofruddiaeth Lily Volpert, Wasg Gomer (2000).
- John J. Eddleston, A Century of Welsh Murders and Executions, The History Press (2008).
- Alan Llwyd, Cymru Ddu: Hanes Pobl Dduon Cymru/Black Wales: A History of Black Welsh People, Hughes and Son (2005).
- Michael Mansfield, Memoirs of a Radical Lawyer, Bloomsbury (2009).
- John Minkes and Maurice Vanstone, Gender, Race and the Death Penalty: Lessons from Three 1950s Murder Trials, Howard Journal of Criminal Justice, 45(4), 403–420 (2006).
- Nadifa Mohamed, The Fortune Men, Viking (2021).
- Chris Phillips, Hanged for the Word If: The murder of Lily Volpert and the execution of Mahmood Hussein Mattan, the author (2020).
- David Thomas, Seek Out the Guilty, Long (1969) (chapter on the murder of Granville George Jenkins by Tahir Gass).
- Geoff Tibballs, Legal Blunders, Robinson (2000).
