= Western Cemetery (Cardiff) =

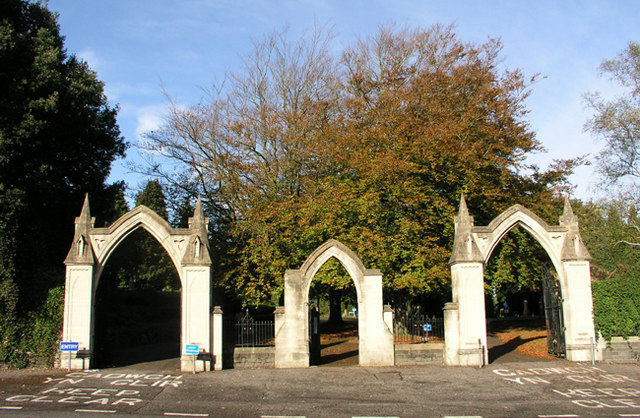
- Eastern entrance to the cemetery (2006)
- Interactive map of Western Cemetery

Details
- Established: July 1936
- Location: Ely, Cardiff
- Country: Wales
- Coordinates: 51°28′15″N 3°15′58″W
- Type: Public
- Owned by: Cardiff Council
- Website: Western Cemetery website

Western Cemetery is a major cemetery located in the western suburb of Ely, Cardiff, Wales. It is located near the Culverhouse Cross roundabout on the A48 road west of the city and provides burial facilities for people of all faiths.

== Location ==
The cemetery is located close to Culverhouse Cross and St Fagans, in the very west of the district of Ely, on the Cowbridge Road West section of the A48 road near the Culverhouse Cross roundabout. The western rim of the cemetery is framed by Michaelston Road which leads to St. Fagans. North of the cemetery is the Glamorgan Wanderers RFC rugby club.

== Cemetery ==
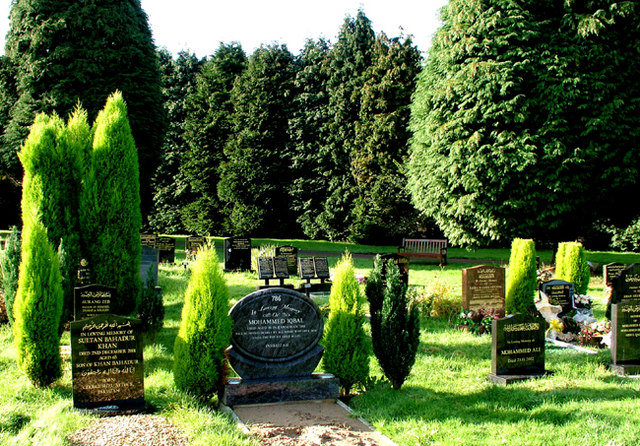
Muslim sector of the cemetery (2006)

The cemetery was opened in July 1936. The types of grave available include lawn graves, traditional graves and cremated remains. Traditional style memorials can be erected for Muslim, Greek Orthodox and Jewish burials. Memorial plaques can be installed and there is a garden where cremated remains may be scattered. There is also a Jewish prayer house. During the summer, on weekdays the cemetery is open from 9am till 5.45pm while at weekends and bank holidays it opens at 10am. During the winter, the hour of closing is earlier.

A 'Dear Mum' remembrance garden was opened in 2021 in the centre of the cemetery. It creates in three-dimensions the story of a mouse called Dora, to help children deal with feelings of bereavement.

== War Graves ==
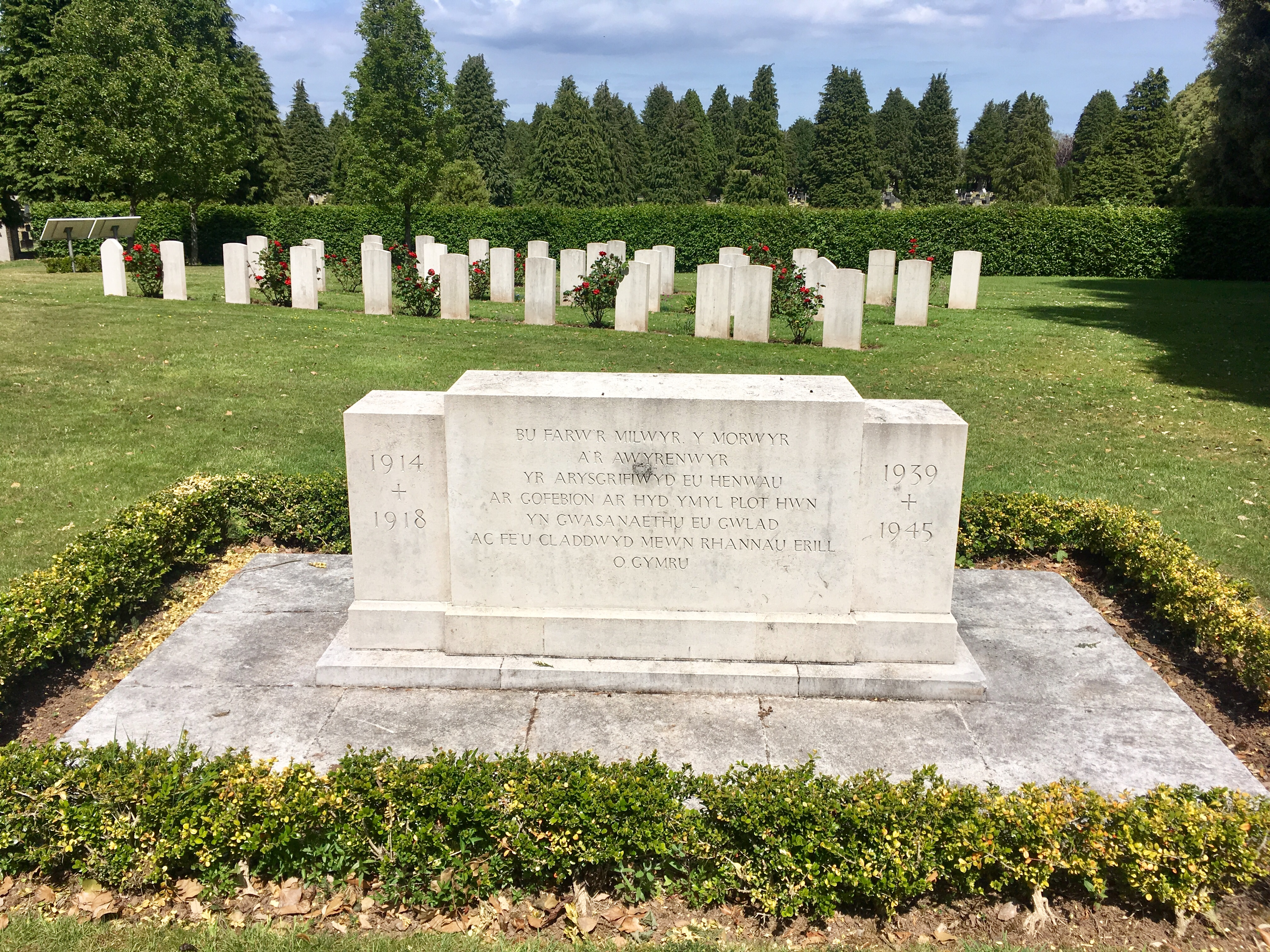
Commonwealth war graves at Western Cemetery in 2020

The Commonwealth War Graves Commission marks, records and maintains the graves of military service personnel from the Commonwealth who died in the two World Wars. At Western Cemetery, the Commission cares for the graves or memorials of 22 casualties from the First World War, and those for the 121 servicemen who died as a result of the Second World War. There are also three special memorials in the cemetery to commemorate fourteen of these casualties buried in other places where their graves could not be maintained.

== Notable burials ==
- Bartley Wilson
- Mahmood Hussein Mattan
