= 1979 Cardiff City Council election =

Local election in Cardiff, Wales

The 1979 Cardiff City Council election was held on Thursday 3 May 1979 to elect councillors to Cardiff District Council (later to become known as Cardiff City Council) in Cardiff, Wales. It took place on the same day as other council elections in the United Kingdom.

The previous Cardiff City Council elections took place in 1976 and the next full elections took place in 1983.

The 1979 election saw the Conservative Party lose their majority to the Labour Party.

== Background ==
199 Candidates from 5 parties ran. 1 Independent also ran in the Riverside ward who was formerly of the Ratepayers Association. Despite being an incumbent Councillor he lost.

The Conservative Party ran a full slate of candidates. The Labour Party ran 69 candidates, Plaid Cymru ran 33 candidates and the Liberal Party ran 19 candidates.

== Results ==
Contests took place in all except two of the wards at this election.

Cardiff District Council election result 1979
Party	Seats	Gains	Losses	Net gain/loss	Seats %	Votes %	Votes	+/−
Labour	41	13	0	+13	54.7			
Conservative	34	1	12	-11	45.3			
Liberal	0	0	0	±0.0	0.0			
Plaid Cymru	0	0	0	±0.0	0.0			
Independent	0	0	2	-2	0.0		1,001	N/A
Communist	0	0	0	±0.0	0.0		128	

== Ward results ==
=== Adamsdown (3 seats) ===
Adamsdown
Party	Candidate	Votes	%	±%
Labour	D. Evans	2,440	68.4	+8.5
Labour	J. Jones	2,286		
Labour	D. Ford	2,229		
Conservative	B. Jones	1,129	31.6	−8.5
Conservative	L. Quinn	916		
Conservative	D. Norman	915		
Turnout			33.4	+65.7
Registered electors		5,429		
Labour hold		Swing		
Labour hold		Swing		
Labour hold		Swing		

=== Canton (3 seats) ===
Canton
Party	Candidate	Votes	%	±%
Conservative	Bella Brown*	2,378	50.9	−11.5
Labour	J. Donovan	2,292	49.1	+11.5
Labour	L. Davis	2,007		
Conservative	Trevor Tyrell	1,984		
Conservative	D. Davey	1,888		
Labour	T. Downey	1,861		
Turnout			66.3	+23.5
Registered electors		7,046		
Conservative hold		Swing		
Labour gain from Conservative		Swing		
Labour gain from Conservative		Swing		

=== Cathays (3 seats) ===
Cathays
Party	Candidate	Votes	%	±%
Labour	Derek Allinson	3,185	47.0	+16.6
Labour	John Charles Edwards	2,964		
Labour	J. Drysdale	2,928		
Conservative	M. Buckley	2,511	37.1	+8.9
Conservative	F. Moorcraft	2,374		
Conservative	P. Reynolds	2,363		
Liberal	G. Snell	711	10.5	−1.3
Liberal	D. Rees	653		
Liberal	J. Ball	629		
Plaid Cymru	T. O'Neill	364	5.4	−6.7
Plaid Cymru	B. George	318		
Plaid Cymru	G. Tilley	308		
Turnout			75.9	+36.4
Registered electors		8,917		
Labour hold		Swing		
Labour hold		Swing		
Labour gain from Conservative		Swing		

=== Central (3 seats) ===
Central
Party	Candidate	Votes	%	±%
Labour	William Herbert	1,683	37.5	+10.6
Labour	M. Flynn	1,631		
Labour	C. Beach	1,606		
Conservative	D. Marles	1,231	35.2	±0.0
Conservative	P. Lowes	1,215		
Conservative	J. Miles	1,180		
Liberal	S. Jones	338	9.7	+9.7
Plaid Cymru	R. Griffiths	247	7.1	−2.1
Liberal	G. Sagoo	237		
Plaid Cymru	P. Riley			
Plaid Cymru	D. Hopkins	193		
Liberal	M. Ball	37		
Turnout			63.1	+15.2
Registered electors		5,545		
Labour hold		Swing		
Labour gain from Conservative		Swing		
Labour gain from Conservative		Swing		

=== Ely (6 seats) ===
Ely
Party	Candidate	Votes	%	±%
Labour	William Carling	6,230	70.1	+17.1
Labour	A. Buttle	5,855		
Labour	David Seligman	5,664		
Labour	Charlie Gale	5,356		
Labour	N. Jenkins	5,143		
Labour	V. Sloman	5,025		
Conservative	R. Benson	2,651	29.9	−7.0
Conservative	J. Bushrod	2,532		
Conservative	W. Roberts	2,469		
Conservative	P. Fitzpatrick	2,456		
Conservative	S. Downes	2,424		
Conservative	M. Warren	2,392		
Turnout			61.2	+28.3
Registered electors		14,505		
Labour hold		Swing		
Labour hold		Swing		
Labour hold		Swing		
Labour hold		Swing		
Labour hold		Swing		
Labour hold		Swing		

=== Gabalfa (3 seats) ===
Gabalfa
Party	Candidate	Votes	%	±%
Labour	Michael Parry	4,157	55.1	+12.1
Labour	P. Owen	3,974		
Labour	E. Matthewson	3,597		
Conservative	T. Merridew	3,000	39.8	+6.0
Conservative	C. Saunders	2,831		
Conservative	V. Kempton	2,770		
Plaid Cymru	L. Evans	386	5.1	−6.0
Plaid Cymru	B. Williams	271		
Plaid Cymru	C. Schoen	213		
Turnout			76.1	+27.1
Registered electors		9,911		
Labour gain from Conservative		Swing		
Labour hold		Swing		
Labour gain from Conservative		Swing		

=== Grangetown (3 seats) ===
Grangetown
Party	Candidate	Votes	%	±%
Conservative	J. O'Reilly	2,529	57.0	+6.9
Conservative	Gwendoline Judd	2,335		
Conservative	B. Moorcraft	2,315		
Labour	D. Lydiard	2,289	45.3	+2.3
Labour	P. Duddridge	2,240		
Labour	B. Mainsbridge	2,216		
Plaid Cymru	B. Hoolahan	231	4.6	N/A
Plaid Cymru	I. Walters	142		
Plaid Cymru	M. Williams	127		
Turnout			70.3	+28.5
Registered electors		7,183		
Conservative hold		Swing		
Conservative hold		Swing		
Conservative hold		Swing		

=== Lisvane, Llanedeyrn and St Mellons (1 seat) ===
Lisvane, Llanedeyrn and St Mellons
Party	Candidate	Votes	%	±%
Conservative	T. H. Davies	Unopposed		
Turnout		0	0.0	N/A
Registered electors		3,037		
Conservative hold		Swing		

=== Llandaff (3 seats) ===
Llandaff
Party	Candidate	Votes	%	±%
Conservative	H. Ferguson-James	3,954	58.1	−9.0
Conservative	M. Jones	3,722		
Conservative	J. Hermer	3,677		
Labour	C. Lewis	1,960	28.8	+12.9
Labour	G. Rhoden	1,802		
Plaid Cymru	G. Bowman	896	13.2	−6.9
Turnout			49.1	+26.1
Registered electors		9,054		
Conservative hold		Swing		
Conservative hold		Swing		
Conservative hold		Swing		

=== Llanishen (6 seats) ===
Llanishen
Party	Candidate	Votes	%	±%
Conservative	C. Milson	5,952	35.4	+13.3
Conservative	Ronald Watkiss	5,814		
Conservative	L. Smith	5,813		
Conservative	A. Lewis	5,658		
Conservative	D. Thomas	5,636		
Conservative	G. Tatham	5,556		
Labour	A. Brown	3,402	11.3	+16.5
Labour	A. Davies	3,373		
Labour	H. Howell	3,301		
Labour	B. Williams	3,284		
Labour	S. Jeans	3,191		
Labour	E. Williams	2,029		
Liberal	C. Pearcy	2,015	16.5	+3.9
Plaid Cymru	R. Edwards	848	6.9	−1.4
Plaid Cymru	S. Doyle	820		
Plaid Cymru	J. May	722		
Turnout			90.5	+12.4
Registered electors		13,504		
Conservative hold		Swing		
Conservative hold		Swing		
Conservative hold		Swing		
Conservative hold		Swing		
Conservative hold		Swing		
Conservative gain from Ratepayers		Swing		

=== Penylan (6 seats) ===
Penylan
Party	Candidate	Votes	%	±%
Conservative	A. Austin	10,159	51.5	−13.8
Conservative	R. Hennessy	10,114		
Conservative	Stefan Terlezki	10,100		
Conservative	M. Newman	10,060		
Conservative	A. John	10,039		
Conservative	A. Thomas	9,402		
Labour	G. Thomas	5,317	26.9	+12.9
Labour	S. Caesar	4,953		
Labour	M. Edwards	4,921		
Labour	P. Williams	4,916		
Labour	L. Green	4,658		
Liberal	P. Davies	3,129	15.8	+1.7
Liberal	J. Jones	2,990		
Liberal	D. Hill	2,961		
Liberal	P. Linsey	2,735		
Liberal	C. Mitchell	2,548		
Liberal	A. Reeves	2,386		
Plaid Cymru	E. Bush	1,138	5.8	−0.8
Plaid Cymru	B. Hughes	1,084		
Plaid Cymru	A. Couch	1,077		
Plaid Cymru	A. Morgan	1,060		
Plaid Cymru	C. Lake	1,003		
Plaid Cymru	I. Howells	970		
Turnout			77.2	+28.6
Registered electors		25,568		
Conservative hold		Swing		
Conservative hold		Swing		
Conservative hold		Swing		
Conservative hold		Swing		
Conservative hold		Swing		
Conservative hold		Swing		

=== Plasmawr (6 seats) ===
Plasmawr
Party	Candidate	Votes	%	±%
Labour	D. O'Driscoll	5,201	52.6	+13.2
Labour	F. Tyrrell	5,152		
Labour	M. Phillips	5,044		
Labour	M. Longden	4,965		
Labour	D. Evans	4,883		
Labour	B. Shorten	4,808		
Conservative	B. Hall	3,454	39.0	+14.0
Conservative	D. Davies	3,331		
Conservative	A. Trott	3,259		
Conservative	W. Jones	3,201		
Conservative	H. Derrick	3,141		
Conservative	E. McAuliffe	3,139		
Plaid Cymru	D. Davies	1,228	21.6	−9.2
Turnout			37.2	+30.9
Registered electors		14,519		
Labour hold		Swing		
Labour gain from Conservative		Swing		
Labour gain from Conservative		Swing		
Labour hold		Swing		
Labour gain from Conservative		Swing		
Labour hold		Swing		

=== Plasnewydd (3 seats) ===
Plasnewydd
Party	Candidate	Votes	%	±%
Conservative	Olwen Watkin	2,517	40.0	−0.2
Conservative	S. James	2,325		
Conservative	D. J. Evans	2,258		
Labour	C. Richards	2,097	33.3	+7.6
Labour	C. Robinson	1,848		
Labour	S. Khan	1,621		
Liberal	G. German	1,022	16.2	+9.4
Liberal	P. Jarman	719		
Plaid Cymru	Owen John Thomas	654	10.4	−7.2
Liberal	P. Brightman	629		
Plaid Cymru	G. Rees	377		
Plaid Cymru	D. Bianchi	325		
Turnout			75.2	+29.0
Registered electors		8,368		
Conservative hold		Swing		
Conservative hold		Swing		
Conservative hold		Swing		

=== Radyr, St Fagans, Tongwynlais (2 seats) ===
Radyr, St Fagans, Tongwynlais
Party	Candidate	Votes	%	±%
Conservative	L. B. Clarke	Unopposed		
Conservative	G. W. Millard	Unopposed		
Turnout		0	0.0	N/A
Registered electors		5,197		
Conservative hold		Swing		
Conservative hold		Swing		

=== Rhiwbina (3 seats) ===
Rhiwbina
Party	Candidate	Votes	%	±%
Conservative	William John A. Bain	5,650	67.3	+8.5
Conservative	G. Jones	5,561		
Conservative	G. Neale	5,549		
Labour	D. Rees	1,934	11.8	+11.2
Labour	E. Woolfe	1,933		
Labour	R. Woolfe	1,779		
Plaid Cymru	D. Davies	817	14.7	−5.0
Plaid Cymru	R. Williams	611		
Turnout			80.1	+25.4
Registered electors		10,493		
Conservative hold		Swing		
Conservative hold		Swing		
Conservative hold		Swing		

=== Riverside (3 seats) ===
Riverside
Party	Candidate	Votes	%	±%
Labour	W. Walker	2,231	40.9	+22.0
Labour	J. McCarthy	1,983		
Labour	A. Verma	1,830		
Conservative	S. Doxsey	1,814	33.3	−6.3
Conservative	R. De Souza	1,789		
Conservative	F. McAndrews	1,534		
Independent	D. Mathias	1,001	18.4	N/A
Plaid Cymru	G. Arthur	405	7.4	−1.6
Turnout			72.9	+18.5
Registered electors		7,476		
Labour gain from Conservative		Swing		
Labour gain from Ratepayers		Swing		
Labour gain from Conservative		Swing		

=== Roath (3 seats) ===
Roath
Party	Candidate	Votes	%	±%
Conservative	N. Lloyd-Edwards	4,677	62.7	+3.7
Conservative	C. Hutchings	4,563		
Conservative	Gerald Brinks	4,393		
Labour	T. Tucker	2,784	37.3	+20.2
Labour	N. Davies	2,426		
Labour	R. Rees	2,288		
Turnout			72.9	+30.9
Registered electors		10,228		
Conservative hold		Swing		
Conservative hold		Swing		
Conservative hold		Swing		

=== Rumney (6 seats) ===
Rumney
Party	Candidate	Votes	%	±%
Labour	M. Llewellyn	8,581	52.7	+11.7
Labour	B. Drew	7,494		
Labour	D. English	7,435		
Labour	Alun Michael	7,403		
Labour	John Randall Phillips	7,348		
Labour	John Reynolds	7,281		
Conservative	I. Davies	4,752	31.5	+4.1
Conservative	A. McCarthy	4,705		
Conservative	P. Thomas	4,654		
Conservative	M. Battista	4,597		
Conservative	T. Jose	4,532		
Conservative	P. Nicholson	4,394		
Turnout			70.1	+28.1
Registered electors		19,012		
Labour hold		Swing		
Labour hold		Swing		
Labour hold		Swing		
Labour hold		Swing		
Labour hold		Swing		
Labour hold		Swing		

=== South (3 seats) ===
South
Party	Candidate	Votes	%	±%
Labour	Philip Dunleavy	2,616	56.1	+3.6
Labour	J. Smith	2,510		
Labour	P. H. Bowen	2,312		
Conservative	E. Williams	1,475	43.9	−10.3
Conservative	F. Arnold	1,378		
Conservative	K. Williams	1,228		
Plaid Cymru	E. Roberts	165	3.8	N/A
Plaid Cymru	D. Harris	149		
Communist	S. Richards	128	2.9	N/A
Turnout			69.6	+31.3
Registered electors		6,298		
Labour hold		Swing		
Labour hold		Swing		
Labour hold		Swing		

=== Splott (3 seats) ===
Splott
Party	Candidate	Votes	%	±%
Labour	D. Ormonde	3,393	64.5	+22.6
Labour	E. Price	3,027		
Labour	J. Southern	2,793		
Conservative	A. Kelly	1,866	35.5	+6.8
Conservative	F. Chichester	1,788		
Conservative	R. James	1,682		
Turnout			74.1	+26.6
Registered electors		7,096		
Labour hold		Swing		
Labour hold		Swing		
Labour hold		Swing		

=== Whitchurch (3 seats) ===
Whitchurch
Party	Candidate	Votes	%	±%
Conservative	T. Davies	4,413	53.8	+3.5
Conservative	W. Griffiths	4,359		
Conservative	Victor Riley	4,299		
Labour	W. Davies	2,374	28.9	+9.4
Labour	T. Crews	2,266		
Labour	T. James	2,151		
Liberal	P. O'Brien	1,021	12.4	+0.9
Liberal	S. Soffa	829		
Liberal	C. Webb	780		
Plaid Cymru	H. Pritchard-Jones	393	4.8	−13.8
Plaid Cymru	I. Williams	358		
Turnout			70.3	+9.9
Registered electors		10,221		
Conservative hold		Swing		
Conservative hold		Swing		
Conservative hold		Swing		
