= Steve Andrews =

British singer (born 1953)

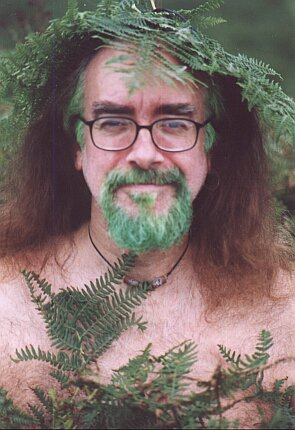
- Steve Andrews in a promotional image
- Born: Canton, Cardiff, Wales
- Other name: The Bard of Ely
- Occupations: Musician; journalist; author; TV presenter; compère
- Known for: Welsh icon, coloured beard
- Website: www.bardofely.org

Steve Andrews (aka "The Bard of Ely"), is a singer-songwriter, writer and journalist with a strong interest in botany and conservation. Andrews is known for having a brightly coloured beard and being a Welsh icon.

== Early life ==
Steve Andrews was born in Canton, Cardiff in 1953 and lived in Ely for 25 years, a suburb on the outskirts of Cardiff in South Wales.

== Writing career ==
He was dubbed "The Bard of Ely" by Big Issue Cymru when he had a regular column in the publication.

Andrews is the author of "Herbs of the Northern Shaman" published by O-Books and Hummadruz and a Life of High Strangeness.

He has written articles and features for many publications including Tenerife News newspaper, Big Issue, Kindred Spirit, Eye on Life magazine, Prediction, Permaculture, Feed Your Brain, Living Tenerife and the National Federation of Occupational Pensioners magazines.

He has a Cardiff University BA (Honours) degree in Journalism, Film and Broadcast.

== Television and radio ==
Andrews was a co-presenter for two series of "In Full View" on the BBC Choice Digital channel and has also been featured on HTV's "Weird Wales" and appeared as a musician on BBC Cymru Wales' "The Slate", and a guest on BBC2's "Roll over Beethoven". Also his song "Rubber Ducky" was used in the drama Y Tŷ ("The House") on S4C.

Andrews was a guest on many of Steve Johnson's radio shows in Wales.

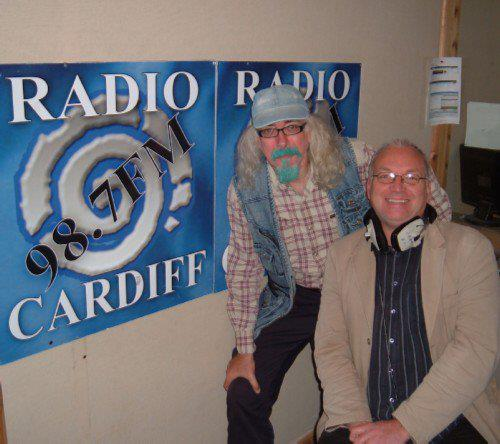
Steve Andrews (left) with Steve Johnson at Radio Cardiff

== Music ==
Andrews has released a number of albums since 1989 on various indie record labels, including a collaboration with Ian Kaye and Philip Moxham (from "Young Marble Giants") called "Taffia EP" and has had tracks released on a number of compilations.

Discography:

Year	Album	Record label	Media	Notes
1997	Sound of One	Very Good Records	vinyl LP	
1998	Mask	Pink Lemon Records	vinyl EP	
2002	Taffia EP	Crai Records	CD	Collaboration
2003	Best of the Bard	mp3.com	CD	
2019	Songs of the Now and Then	bandcamp	digital album download	

Tracks contained in compilations:

Year	Album	Record label	Media
1989	Meltdown the Album	Chariot Records	vinyl LP
1993	Pop Vocals and Instrumentals	Off the Shelf Music	CD
1998	Take It to the Bridge Vol. 3	Bridge Records	CD
2001	United World Underground	MMATT	CD
2002	Dim Apathi	Dockrad Records	CD
2003	Green Man Festival album	Double Snazzy	CD
2003	Bands United	Bands United	CD

== Featured in ==
- the book "The World's Most Mysterious People" by Lionel and Patricia Fanthorpe
- the book "The Last of the Hippies" and other titles by C.J. Stone
- as Peter's guide to the west of Cardiff in the book "Real Cardiff" by Peter Finch
- quoted at length in the book "Leonard Cohen: a remarkable life" by Anthony Reynolds
