= Cardiff Ely bread riots =

1991 outbreak of violence in Cardiff, Wales

Coordinates: 51.4796°N 3.2566°W

The Cardiff Ely bread riots, or Ely petrol riots, was the outbreak of violence that occurred in the council suburb of Ely in the capital of Wales, Cardiff, during September 1991. The unrest was attributed to a dispute between two shopkeepers over who could sell bread and other food products which escalated into a riot involving up to 500 participants. An estimated 175 police officers were mobilised, including reinforcements called in from the Vale of Glamorgan, to deal with the unrest.

== Background ==
The South Wales region had been experiencing an economic downturn at the start of the 1990s. Unemployment among young men in the Ely area was widespread, with an estimated 30% of the demographic being out of work. The miners' strikes in the mid-1980s had led to tension between the working class and the Tory government which had been in power for 12 years at the time. The Ely area of Cardiff was an area that had seen poverty levels increase for low paid workers or people living on the benefits system.

The weather at the time of the incident has also been attributed as a factor. Labour Member of Parliament (MP) for Cardiff West, Rhodri Morgan, later described how "the weather was absolutely scorching and sultry, which was half the problem".

In 1991, tensions were raised when a dispute broke out between two shopkeepers in Ely over council restrictions over what each shop could sell. Abdul Waheed, a Pakistani-born shopowner who had opened his store at 70 Wilson Road seven years earlier, was accused by some locals of trying to put a white shopkeeper, Carl Agius, who was of Maltese descent, out of business. Waheed had obtained a court injunction that banned the rival shop from selling bread and other food products at discounted prices. The pair had been involved in a long running dispute over the sale of certain products that had been ongoing for two years prior to the incident. Some local residents claimed the unrest was triggered by Waheed's alleged treatment of suspected shoplifters. However, both shopkeepers later denied their actions were the cause of the unrest.

== Riot ==
On 31 August, Waheed's premises on Wilson Road were vandalised when bricks and stones were thrown at the store. Police officers were deployed to stand guard outside the shop after locals continually threatened the site. Local MP Rhodri Morgan travelled to the site in the early stages in an attempt to appease the situation. Morgan was nearly hit by eggs thrown by locals that instead hit a police inspector that he was in conversation with. Morgan later wrote in his autobiography that he had made a mistake by speaking to police first at the scene rather than locals, believing he had shown that he was siding with the authorities.

The store was targeted for two further nights as Waheed and an employee remained in the flat above. However, the pair left the house and fled to Birmingham when advised to leave the store by local police.

After the initial disturbances, youths from other areas of Cardiff and Barry began travelling to the site in order to join in the disruption. To combat the arrival of further rioters from outside the area, the police began turning non-locals away from the area in what was described as a "sterile-zone". Over the weekend of 1–2 September, estimates put the number of rioters at around 500, who threw stones, petrol bombs and fired air rifles at riot police. 22 arrests were made over the initial two days.

Police arrested 11 people on 3 September, including three over an incident where a car was driven at a line of police officers. During the operation, numerous police officers from the Vale of Glamorgan area were called in to assist, as well as officers from the wider South Wales region. In total, an estimated 175 officers were mobilised at the height of the disturbances. Cardiff police were equipped with full riot gear during the unrest, the first time in the force's history that the equipment had been used, and the force's helicopter was deployed.

== Aftermath ==
The unrest in Ely was linked to similar disturbances in other parts of Britain. In the weeks around the Ely riots, there had been riots in Handsworth, Birmingham and on the Blackbird Leys Estate in Oxford, linked with social factors such as high rates of unemployment and "disaffected" youth. Conservative Home Secretary Kenneth Baker responded to the unrest by describing the perpetrators as "yobbos and hooligans". His response was heavily criticised by Labour Council leader Bob Morgan who retorted "pretty outrageous for a home secretary to talk in those terms. [...] He really should be concerned with the underlying causes of these matters."

Morgan blamed the violence on the "build-up of this huge reservoir of disadvantaged youths, which not only can't find employment, but they have no real hope." His response was supported by Labour MP Rhodri Morgan, who also blamed the lack of employment and prospects in the area. Some newspapers claimed that the violence was racially motivated, but these comments were dismissed by local residents and Andrew May, assistant chief constable of South Wales Police, who commented "the local community has taken sides between the two shops and then a large group of younger men have turned their hostile intentions towards the police."

20 people were eventually jailed for various offences perpetrating from the riots, the longest being a 30-month sentence. Local residents have claimed that the riots have left the area "stigmatised". The two shops at the centre of the unrest have since been demolished.

== See also ==
- 2023 Cardiff riot
