= Ely Racecourse =

Former racecourse in Cardiff, Wales

Coordinates: 51.478°N 3.230°W

Ely Racecourse

Ely Racecourse was a horse racing venue in the Ely district of Cardiff, Wales. The racecourse opened in 1855, with the first race being held on 30 May. By 1864 racing at Ely was a regular event, the races that year were acclaimed as 'the most brilliant and successful ever held'.

== History ==
In 1895 the first Welsh Grand National was held at the Ely Racecourse. It was watched by over 40,000 people, many of whom did not pay for entry after charging the entry gates and overpowering the stewards.

In the early 1900s attendance figures began to steadily decline and the racecourse never fully recovered from a fire that destroyed the grandstand in 1937.

The last race to be held there, in 1939, was won by Grasshopper, ridden by Keith Piggott, father of the famous jockey Lester Piggott.

Trelai Park is now on the site of the racecourse.

== See also ==
- Sport in Cardiff

See my book The Welsh Grand National - From Deerstalker to Emperor's Choice.

Published by the History Press.
