= Cardiff West Community High School =

Location
- Penally Road; Ely; Cardiff, CF5 5XP; Wales; 51.4752°N 3.2322°W

Information
- School type: State Secondary
- Motto: Create Your World
- Established: 2017
- Educational authority: Cardiff Council
- Head teacher: Victoria Evans
- Age: 11 to 18
- Enrolment: 613 (2019)
- Language: English
- Feeder schools: Ely Primary, Caerau Primary, Trelai Primary
- Website: School website

Cardiff West Community High School is a secondary school in Ely, Cardiff, Wales, that teaches through the medium of English.

== Construction ==
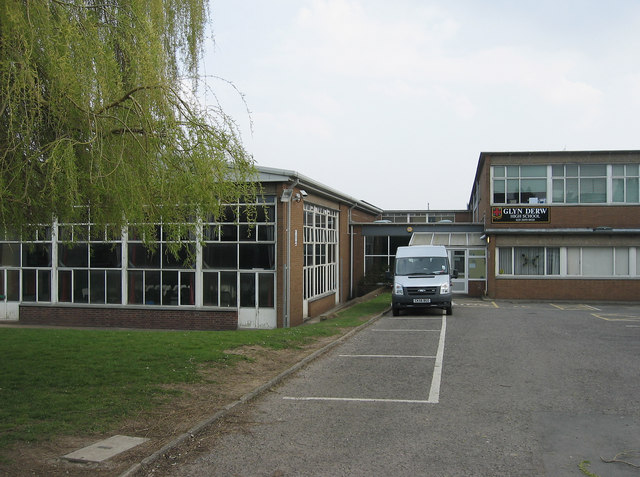
Former Glyn Derw High School (2007)

Cardiff West Community High School was built on the site of Glyn Derw High School. Although Glyn Derw had already been closed, a fire started by arson destroyed much of the school, delaying construction. The new build cost £36,000,000, and the project was run by Willmott Dixon. The final cost was an increase on the original government estimate of £28,000,000, and a construction company estimate of £30,000,000.

It was built to supersede both Glyn Derw and Michaelston Community College by providing new buildings and a higher capacity of up to 1,200 Year 7–11 students, and 320 in the sixth form.

The name of the new school was announced in a ceremony at Western Leisure Centre. 60 mosaics were installed in the corridors by local artist Paul Evans, adding to the modern feel of the school building. The new buildings were officially opened by First Minister Mark Drakeford in July 2019.

=== Facilities ===
The school has a 3G artificial turf pitch, which is shared with the community.

== History ==
A Roman helmet on the school badge reflects the Roman history of Ely. It is close to Caerau Hillfort, and is also right next to the site of a Roman villa.

To help with the transition to a new school, students, particularly in Years 7 and 8, received significant support from other schools and colleges.

Following an official inspection by Estyn in November 2018, the school was rated adequate and in need of improvement across all areas. This was an improvement over the predecessor schools, which had been rated unsatisfactory in 2016. The school serves socially deprived areas of Cardiff, with over 45% of the 613 pupils eligible for free school meals.

Since students moved into the new buildings, academic standards have improved significantly.
