= Cowbridge Road West =

Road in Cardiff, Wales

Coordinates: 51.4766°N 3.2463°W

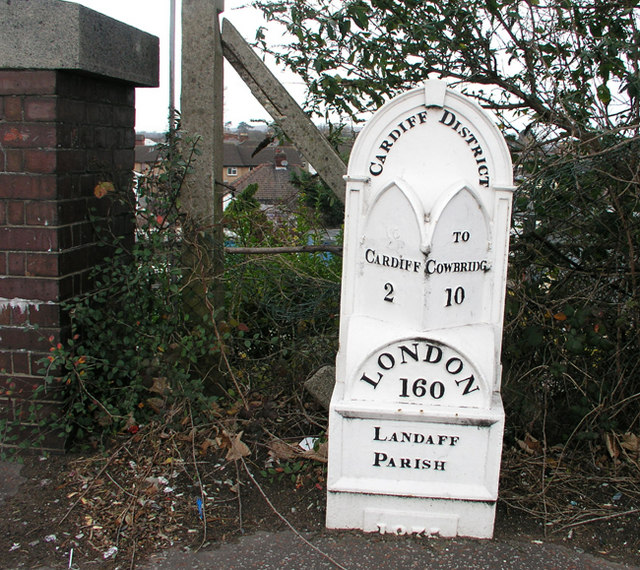
The Grade II listed mile marker at Ely Bridge on Cowbridge Road West near where it joins Cowbridge Road East and Western Avenue

Cowbridge Road West (Welsh: Heol y Bontfaen Gorllewin) is a major road in western Cardiff, the capital of Wales, and forms part of the A48 road.

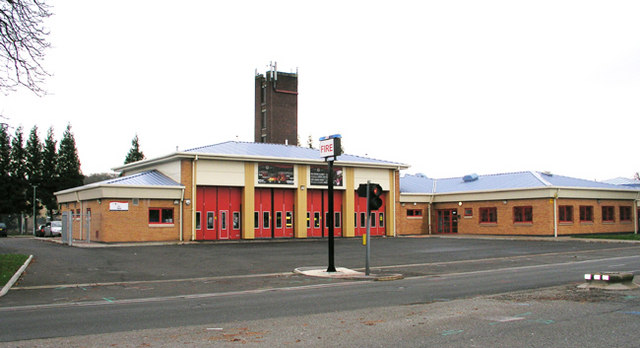
Ely Fire Station on Cowbridge Road West

It divides the districts of Ely and Caerau and connects inner Cardiff to Culverhouse Cross and eventually the M4 motorway via the A4232.

It also connects Cardiff to towns and villages such as Barry, Wenvoe, Cowbridge and Peterston-Super-Ely. Which can be accessed via the A48 from Culverhouse Cross.

The road used to be home to the Ely Hospital, a psychiatric hospital that closed in 1996. It was initially built as a Victorian Workhouse, in 1862. But later became a hospital focusing on the care of the mentally ill and people with learning disabilities in the 1960s. In 1967 News of the World published a story about the abuse patients faced in the male wards of the hospital. Following the publication, a committee was formed to investigate the allegations, leading to the publication of the Ely Report in 1969. This detailed several cases of abuse and mistreatment of patients. Following the publications, former staff spoke about being ashamed about their connection to the hospital. In 1996 the hospital was closed.
