= Ely, Cardiff =

District and community of Cardiff, Wales

Ely: Welsh: Trelái
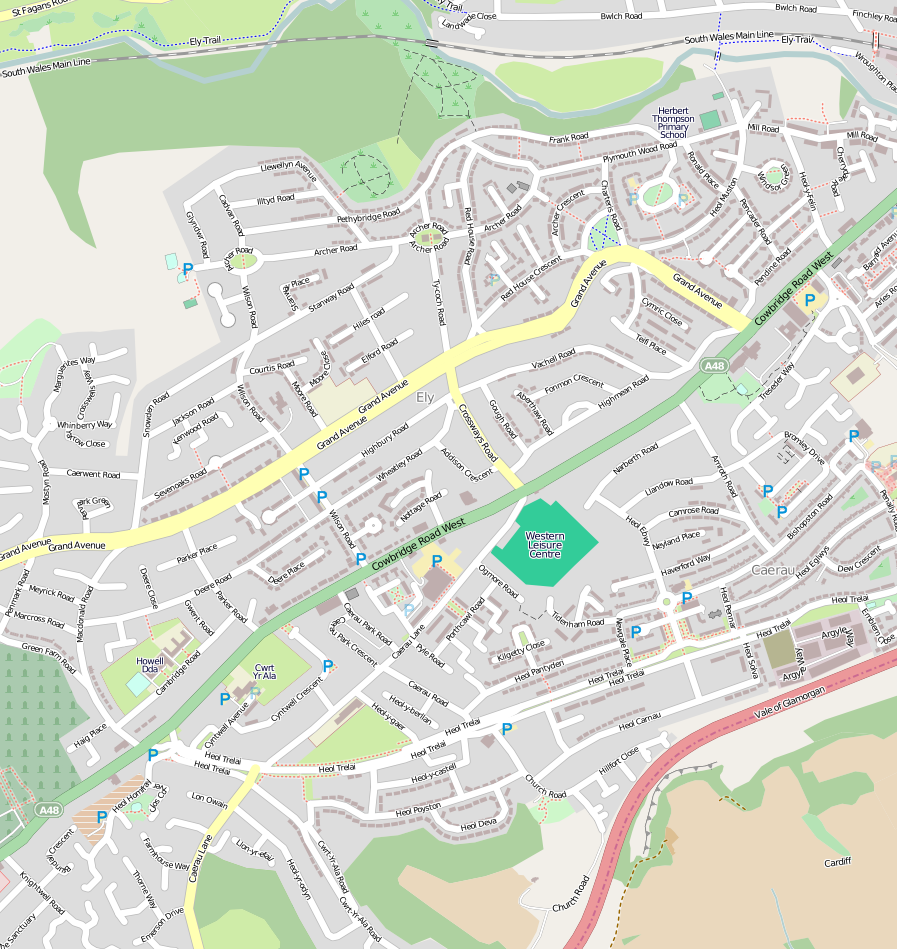

- Location within Cardiff
- Population: 14,603 (2011)
- Community: Ely
- Principal area: Cardiff
- Preserved county: South Glamorgan
- Country: Wales
- Sovereign state: United Kingdom
- Post town: CARDIFF
- Postcode district: CF5
- Dialling code: 029
- Police: South Wales
- Fire: South Wales
- Ambulance: Welsh
- UK Parliament: Cardiff West
- Senedd Cymru – Welsh Parliament: Cardiff West
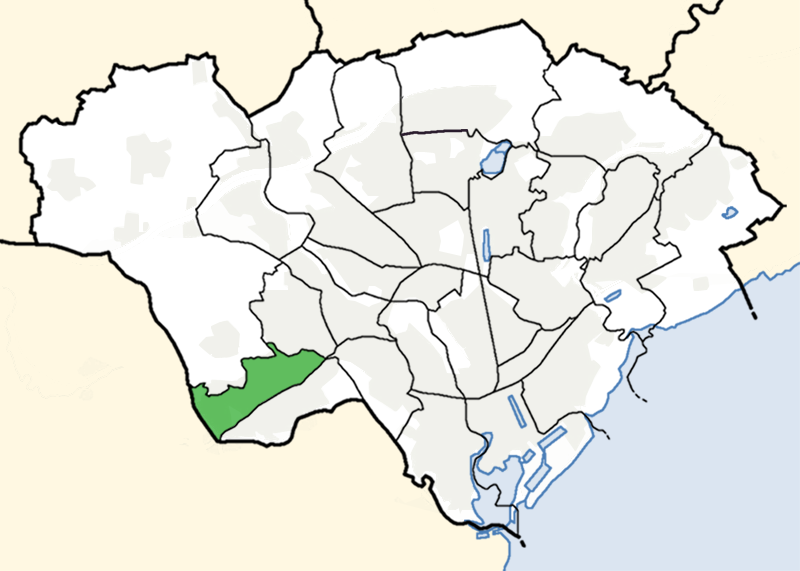
- List of places UK Wales Cardiff 51°28′45″N 3°14′59″W

Ely (Welsh: Trelái from tref, town + Welsh: Afon Elái, River Ely) is a district and community in Cardiff, Wales. It is to the north of Cowbridge Road West. Caerau defines the boundary to the south as does the River Ely to the east and in part to the north.

== Roman era ==
In Roman times, Ely was the site of a Roman villa, near the old racecourse, and of iron smelting possibly using manganese to harden steel. There is also thought to have been a Roman road near the site linking to Cardiff Roman Fort and eastwards to Newport.

== 19th century ==
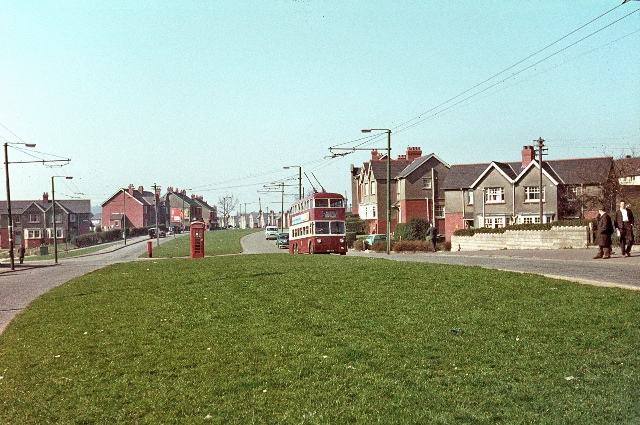
Grand Avenue, 1966

In 1855, the first horse race took place at Ely Racecourse, which took over from the Great Heath racecourse.

The Ordnance Survey map from the early 1880s shows just how isolated the ancient Ely village was from the rest of Cardiff. Reports about travelling along the main road over Ely Common to Cardiff talk of potholes and no shelter and a terrible journey on foot. Most of Ely was still farmland feeding Cardiff's population. A railway station had only recently been constructed, and this gave the surrounding area further potential for mass housing development.

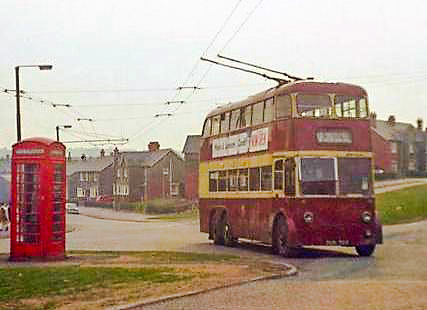
A Cardiff trolleybus crossing Grand Avenue in Ely, 1969.

The 'Ely Industrial School' on Cowbridge Road East was home to orphaned children originally from Cardiff. It had been set up to accommodate "pauper children" from 1863. It was very much a product of the Victorian age, and workhouse mentality, increased social awareness and responsibility saw it closing in 1903 and converted to additional workhouse accommodation for adults (though never used for that purpose), known as Ely Lodge. The children lived in what became known as Ely Homes. The school was demolished some years later and an infectious diseases isolation unit was built on the same site.

The land was once owned by the Earl of Plymouth, who dictated that alcohol may not be sold on the land. As a result, like other plots of land with similar conditions, the boundaries of the old estate can be approximated by the locations of public houses around the area. To attract business from nearby areas, establishments would be built as close to it as possible without actually being in Ely (local establishments are actually in Caerau and Fairwater).

== 20th and 21st centuries ==
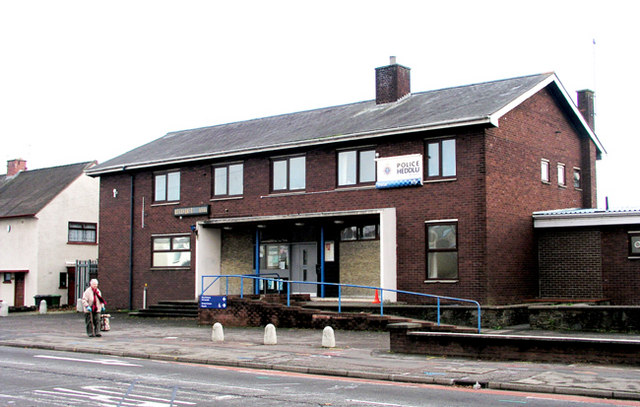
Ely Police Station, Cowbridge Road West

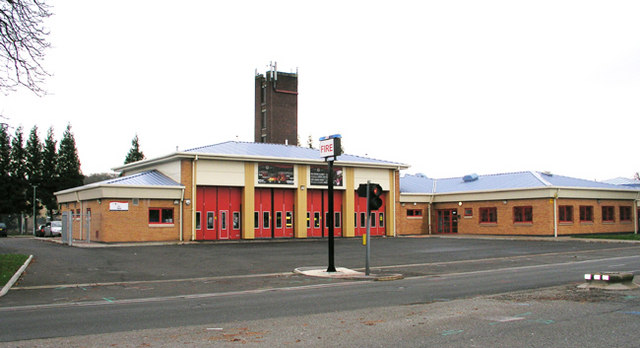
Ely Fire Station, Cowbridge Road West

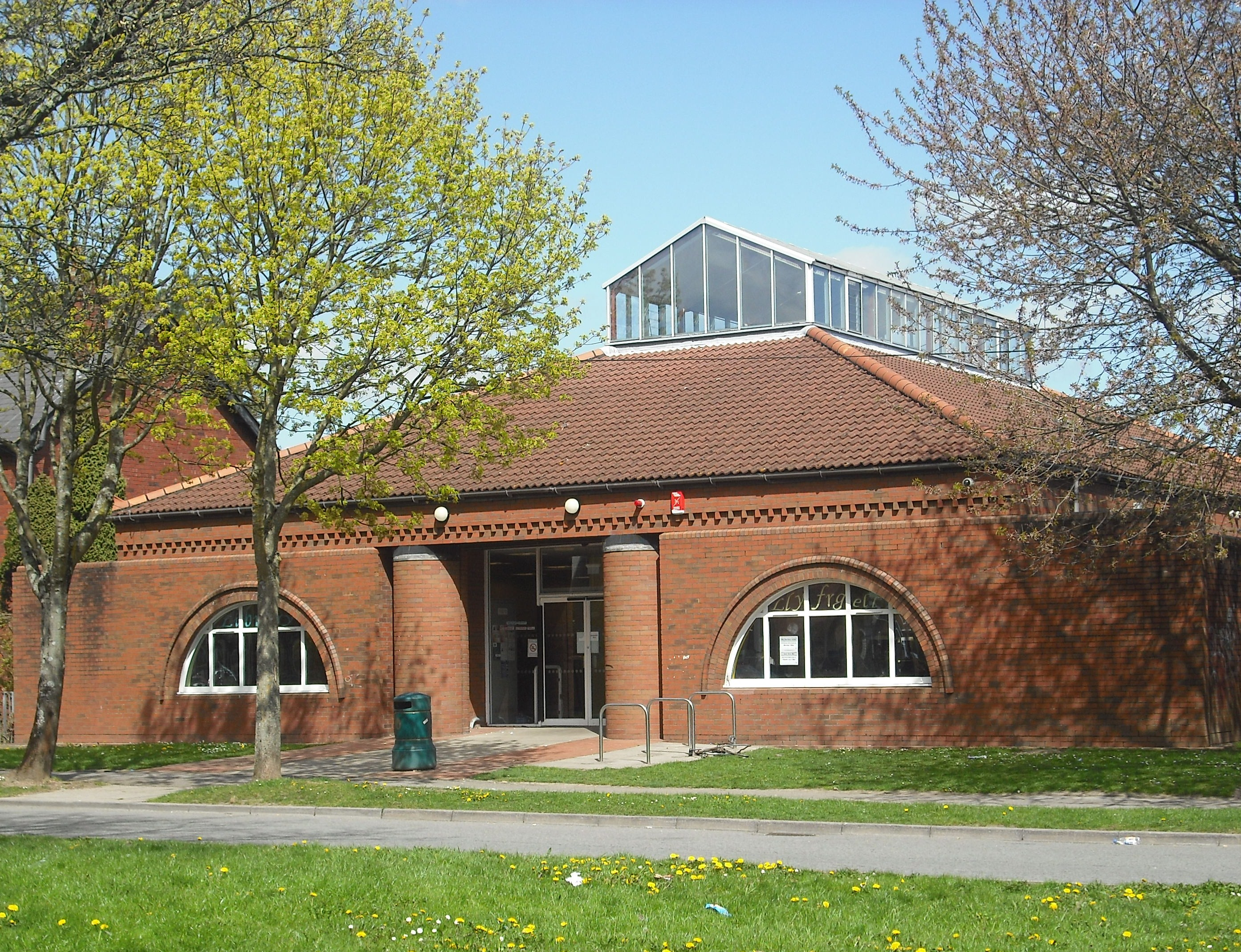
Ely Library

Ely's rapid expansion of housing began in the 1920s to provide 'homes fit for heroes' after World War I. This came with the construction of council houses to rehouse people from Cardiff's inner-city slums.

Ely Racecourse had its grandstand destroyed in a fire in 1937 and was then closed in 1939.

Ely Hospital was a large psychiatric hospital which was the subject of abuse allegations in the 1960s. The subsequent enquiry led to reforms to mental health provision throughout the National Health Service. The hospital closed in 1996.

The area is widely considered to be one of Cardiff's less desirable areas in terms of crime and standard of living. But the residents of Ely are keen to dispel this reputation, citing the fact it is a very large, close-knit community.

=== Crime and disorder ===
The area was scarred by rioting in September 1991 when shops and houses were vandalised and burnt in one of several waves of rioting around that time which occurred nationally and resulted in extensive damage and casualties. The trouble was said to be started after a dispute between Wilson Road shopkeepers over the right to sell bread. Some of the buildings targeted in Ely have since been demolished under more recent redevelopment projects.

In June 1993, 45-year-old former steelworker Les Reed was beaten to death after he challenged a gang of youths on the estate after he and a friend witnessed them vandalising a bollard in the middle of a road. Three local youths were later found guilty of Reed's murder and sentenced to life imprisonment, and a fourth was cleared of murder but found guilty of manslaughter and received a lesser sentence. A friend of Reed, Phillip Tull, was also attacked but survived. After the trial in March 1994, it was revealed that three of the gang had previous convictions for violence, including one gang member who had a conviction for wounding Reed's teenage son Martin in 1991. Around this time, The Independent reported that unemployment on the estate stood at more than 30% (at least three times the national average) and there was an ongoing problem with car crime and gang warfare.

On the night of 22-23 May 2023, rioting broke out in the area after two teenage boys, Kyrees Sullivan and Harvey Evans, were killed when the electric bike they were riding crashed during a police chase.

== Transport ==
Cowbridge Road West (the A48) is the predominant road running through Ely as it runs on to Canton and Cardiff city centre to the east, and to Culverhouse Cross interchange to the west near the Western Cemetery. The parallel Grand Avenue links Cowbridge Road West to the northern estates of Ely.

Ely is served by Cardiff Bus services 17 and 18 which operate every 10 minutes from Wood Street in Cardiff city centre via Canton and Caerau. North Ely is also served by service 13 which terminates at the Cardiff Bus Interchange Cardiff Bus services 96 to Barry, and Adventure_Travel_(bus_company)'s C1 service also serves Ely between Culverhouse Cross, Cardiff City Centre and Pontprennau to the north.

The nearest station is Waun-gron Park in Fairwater. Ely railway station, which closed in 1962, was on the South Wales Main Line.

== Electoral ward ==
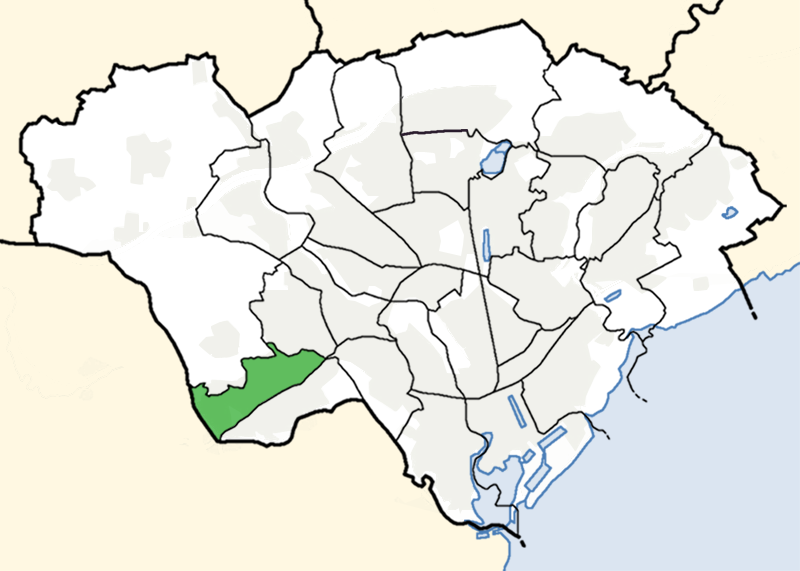
Ely electoral ward of Cardiff

Ely is both an electoral ward, and a community of the City of Cardiff. There is no community council for the area. The electoral ward of Ely falls within the parliamentary constituency of Cardiff West. It is bounded by Fairwater to the northwest; Caerau to the south (although some of Lower Ely is technically in the electoral ward of Caerau, as is Trelai (Ely) Park); Culverhouse Cross to the west; and the Vale of Glamorgan to the southwest.

All three council seats are safely held by the Labour Party, with one of the long-term representatives being former Council leader, Russell Goodway, though in 2004 when Labour lost the Council to the Liberal Democrats, Goodway retained his seat by only 62 votes.

The Ely electoral ward consists of the area north of Cowbridge Road West, while the Caerau electoral ward consists of the area south of Cowbridge Road West. However, a misconception is Caerau being a subsection of the Ely area.

== Notable people ==
- Steve Andrews, the "Bard of Ely"; singer-songwriter, writer and journalist
- Rakie Ayola, actress, raised in Ely
- Ryan Giggs, Manchester United and Wales footballer
- Rosemary Joshua, opera soprano known for her performances in George Frideric Handel's operas
- Danielle Lineker, actress and model
- Mackenzie Martin, Cardiff and Wales rugby union player
- Jason Mohammad, radio and television presenter for the BBC
- Eluned Morgan, Baroness Morgan of Ely, Welsh Labour politician, member of the Senedd, and First Minister of Wales.
- Nicky Piper, super-middleweight and light-heavyweight boxer
- Steve Robinson, WBO featherweight boxer
- Shakin' Stevens, pop singer of the 1980s
- Noel Sullivan, Hear'say member, singer, musical performer, actor.
- Glen Webbe, former Bridgend and Wales rugby union player, described as "Wales first black icon"
- Bob Maplestone, middle distance runner, sub 4-minute mile, born in Ely
- Taff Groves, Ely born, former Special Air Service personnel.

== Amenities ==
Ely features several shopping parades. Two large supermarkets are located just off Cowbridge Road West on nearby Treseder Way. Many small shops and local businesses are notably on Wilson Road and Grand Avenue; and other chain stores are in the Caerau ward.

== Education ==
Primary Schools in Ely:

- Windsor Clive Junior School on Grand Avenue
- Herbert Thompson Primary School on Plymouthwood Road
- Hywel Dda Primary School on Cambria Road
- Saint Fagans Church in Wales Primary School on Drope Road
- Saint Francis RC Primary School on Wilson Road

High Schools in Ely:

- Cardiff West Community High School on Penally Road

Youth Centres in Ely:

- North Ely YC on Pethybridge Road
- Dusty Forge Project on Cowbridge Road West
