= Ely Hospital =

Former hospital in Cardiff, Wales

- Shown in Cardiff

Geography
- Location: Cardiff, Wales
- Coordinates: 51°28′47″N 3°14′12″W

Organisation
- Care system: NHS
- Type: Specialist

Services
- Speciality: Mental health

History
- Founded: 1862
- Closed: 1996

Links
- Lists: Hospitals in Wales

Ely Hospital (Welsh: Ysbyty Trelái) was a large psychiatric hospital in the Ely district of Cardiff, Wales. An inquiry into the ill-treatment of patients at the hospital led to reforms to services for people with intellectual disabilities throughout the UK.

== History ==
The institution was established as a Poor Law Industrial School for Orphaned Children in 1862. The school moved to an adjacent site in 1903, and its original building was then used as a workhouse under the Board of Guardians for accommodating mentally ill, mentally defective and chronic aged and infirm patients. In 1930 control of the institution passed to the Public Assistance Committee of Cardiff City Council. From the establishment of the National Health Service in 1948 it was designated a Mental Deficiency Institution and Mental Hospital and was administered by the Whitchurch and Ely Hospital Management Committee. The committee also managed Whitchurch Hospital, another large psychiatric hospital in Cardiff.

During the Second World War, the Jamaican RAF pilot and future pioneer of Black civil rights in Britain, Billy Strachan, was treated in Ely Hospital for physical injuries he sustained after crashing a Tiger Moth biplane during a training exercise.

In 1969 the hospital was the subject of an official inquiry into the abuse of patients, after allegations about pilfering and ill-treatment had been published in the News of the World on 20 August 1967. This was the second of many Official Inquiry Reports into National Health Service Mental Hospitals. The report, written by Geoffrey Howe (who became a cabinet minister) is still referred to within the NHS as containing important lessons. It went beyond the events at Ely itself, to look at the whole system and the way in which people with "mental handicap" – as it was known at the time – were treated within the NHS.

The Ely Hospital report is regarded as significant in the development of services for these patients. It led to the 1971 white paper Better Services for the Mentally Handicapped and the first inspections of such services. After the introduction of Care in the Community in the early 1980s the hospital went into a period of decline and it finally closed in 1996.

From 2011 to 2012 the Ely Hospital Project was created by Cardiff People First, a self advocacy organisation run by people with a learning disability, some of whom had been residents of Ely Hospital. It was in partnership with Newport People First, Museum of Cardiff and Glamorgan Archives, and funded by the Heritage Lottery Fund, and the only oral history research project to come from the opinions, ideas and voices of people with a learning disability themselves. An exhibition was held in the Museum of Cardiff and the oral histories and project work remain online.

From 2014 to 2016 the Hidden now Heard oral history project gathered stories from former staff, patients and their relatives of six long-stay psychiatric hospitals in Wales, including Ely. The project was undertaken by Mencap Cymru and National Museum Wales, and was funded by the Heritage Lottery Fund. Material from the project was used in a 2016 exhibition about Ely Hospital which was displayed in The Hayes, Cardiff, before transferring to the St Fagans National Museum of History.

== See also ==
- List of medical ethics cases
