= List of communities in Cardiff =

The communities of Cardiff in 2024.

The City and County of Cardiff is a county in the south-east of Wales. It is one of the 22 principal areas of Wales.

Communities are the lowest tier of local government in Wales. Unlike English counties, which often contain unparished areas, all Welsh principal areas are entirely divided into communities.

There are 36 communities in Cardiff, with Pentyrch being the largest and Grangetown the most populated. Six of them have a community council.

== List of communities in Cardiff ==
Community		Population (2011)	Area (km^{2}, 2011)	Pre-1974 district	Remarks	Refs	Location map
English	Welsh	Population (2011)	Area (km^{2}, 2011)	Pre-1974 district	Remarks	Refs	Location map
Adamsdown	Adamsdown	10,371	1.07	Cardiff County Borough	Community without council.		
Butetown	Tre-biwt	10,125	5.12	Cardiff County Borough	Community without council. Includes Flat Holm.		
Caerau	Caerau	11,318	3.03	Cardiff County Borough	Community without council.		
Canton	Treganna	14,304	3.08	Cardiff County Borough	Community without council. Includes Pwll-coch and part of Leckwith.		
Castle	Castell	2,119	1.72	Cardiff County Borough	Community without council.		
Cathays	Cathays	18,002	1.63	Cardiff County Borough	Community without council. Includes part of Maindy.		
Cyncoed	Cyncoed	11,148	3.72	Cardiff County Borough	Community without council.		
Ely	Trelái	14,603	2.91	Cardiff County Borough	Community without council.		
Fairwater	Y Tyllgoed	12,981	3.06	Cardiff County Borough	Community without council. Includes Pentrebane.		
Gabalfa	Gabalfa	8,790	1.27	Cardiff County Borough	Community without council. Includes Mynachdy and part of Maindy.		
Grangetown	Grangetown	19,385	4.3	Cardiff County Borough	Community without council. Includes part of Leckwith.		
Heath	Y Mynydd Bychan	12,629	3.15	Cardiff County Borough	Community without council. Includes Birchgrove.		
Lisvane	Llys-faen	3,707	7.85	Cardiff Rural District			
Llandaff	Llandaf	8,997	2.55	Cardiff County Borough	Community without council. Includes Danescourt.		
Llandaff North	Ystum Taf	8,344	1.99	Cardiff County Borough	Community without council.		
Llanedeyrn	Llanedern	—	—	Cardiff County Borough	Community without council. Created in 2016 from Pentwyn.		
Llanishen	Llanisien	17,417	4.81	Cardiff County Borough	Community without council.		
Llanrumney	Llanrhymni	11,060	3.05	Cardiff County Borough	Community without council.		
Old St Mellons	Pentre Llaneirwg	2,367	3.39	Magor and St Mellons Rural District			
Pentwyn	Pentwyn	15,634	3.68	Cardiff Rural District	Community without council.		
Pentyrch	Pentyrch	6,101	18.4	Cardiff Rural District	Includes Creigiau and Gwaelod-y-Garth.		
Penylan	Pen-y-lan	12,657	3.35	Cardiff County Borough	Community without council.		
Pontcanna	Pontcanna	—	—	Cardiff County Borough	Community without council. Created in 2016 from Riverside.		
Pontprennau	Pontprennau	7,353	5.17	Cardiff Rural District	Community without council. Includes Cardiff Gate.		
Radyr and Morganstown	Radur a Threforgan	6,417	4.67	Cardiff Rural District	Includes Radyr and Morganstown.		
Rhiwbina	Rhiwbeina	11,369	6.42	Cardiff Rural District	Community without council.		
Riverside	Glan yr Afon	13,771	2.59	Cardiff County Borough	Community without council.		
Roath	Y Rhath	18,166	1.63	Cardiff County Borough	Community without council.		
Rumney	Tredelerch	8,827	3.46	Cardiff County Borough	Community without council.		
Splott	Y Sblot	13,261	4.88	Cardiff County Borough	Community without council.		
St Fagans	Sain Ffagan	2,535	10.65	Cardiff Rural District	Includes Plasdwr and Rhydlafar.		
Thornhill	Y Ddraenen	—	—	Cardiff County Borough	Community without council. Created in 2016 from Llanishen.		
Tongwynlais	Tongwynlais	1,871	4.29	Cardiff Rural District			
Tremorfa	Tremorfa	—	—	Cardiff County Borough	Community without council. Created in 2016 from Splott.		
Trowbridge	Trowbridge	16,194	9.21	Magor and St Mellons Rural District	Community without council.		
Whitchurch	Yr Eglwys Newydd	14,267	4.28	Cardiff Rural District	Community without council. Includes Coryton.		
