= Capital City Green =

Bus route branding in Cardiff, Wales

Capital City Green (Route 27)

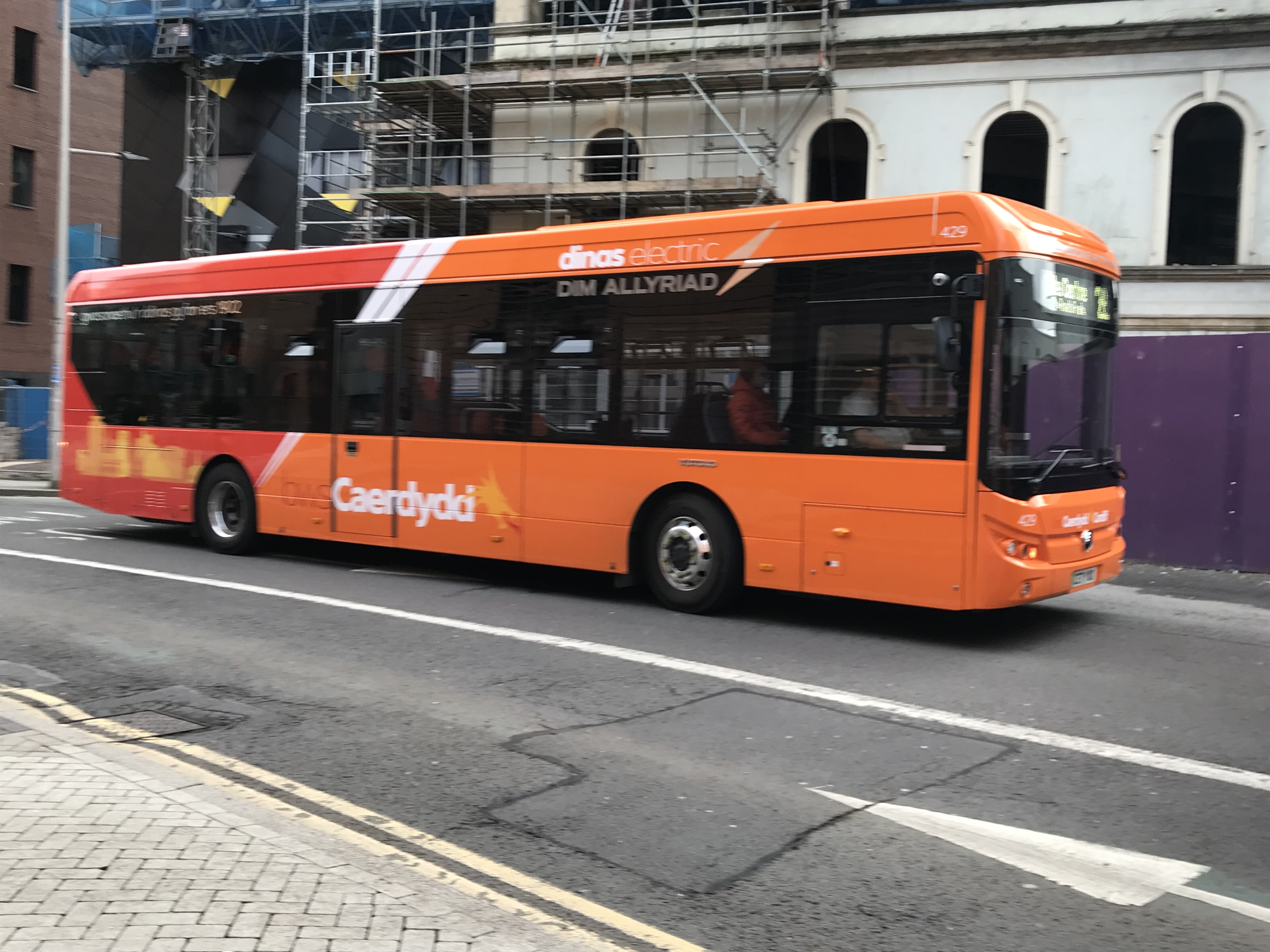
- A Yutong E12 in Cardiff.

Overview
- Operator: Cardiff Bus
- Vehicle: Yutong E12
- Peak vehicle requirement: 12

Route
- Start: The Hayes
- Via: Queen Street station, National Museum, Cathays station, Maindy, Mynachdy, Birchgrove, Heath, Llanishen, Thornhill, Birchgrove, Heath, Blackweir, Cardiff Castle, Westgate Street
- End: The Hayes
- Length: 12.1 miles (19.4 km)

Service
- Frequency: 12 minutes (Morning/Afternoon) 30 minutes (Evening)
- Journey time: 57-75 minutes

Capital City Green was the branding of the bus service 27 Cardiff, operated by Cardiff Bus. The route ran from the city centre to the north of the city, serving the Maindy, Mynachdy, Birchgrove, Heath, Llanishen and Thornhill districts.

The service formed part of the wider Cardiff Bus network and was one of three services initially introduced on the network, to have a unique branding, along with Baycar and Capital City Red.

The upgraded service was introduced in 2007 when Cardiff Bus deployed on the route six out of 15 new Scania OmniCity vehicles which it had purchased at a cost of £2.5 million.

== History ==
Prior to the 1940s, Cardiff trams ran as far north as Gabalfa from the city centre. The trams were replaced with Cardiff trolleybuses in the 1940s until the 1960s when the transition to motor buses began and was completed by 1970. At the time, routes to areas in the west of Cardiff such as Caerau and Culverhouse Cross carried the number 27. Birchgrove and Llanishen were served by the 28B and Thornhill by the 29, which still exist today, running on a different route the 27, making the 27 a newer route.

== Vehicles ==
The route is run by Yutong E12’s buses. All the buses are branded in the standard Cardiff Bus livery. Equipped with air-conditioning, reserved spaces for buggies and wheelchairs, CCTV, on-bus screens with local travel information as well as next stop information. The route uses a fleet of all electric single deckers.

The route use to be run by Scania CN270UB Omnicity.

== Route ==
The 12.1 mile long route circles the city centre anti-clockwise before heading north past the Civic Centre and Cathays railway station, through Maindy, Heath, Birchgrove. It passes through Thornhill and Llanishen in a clockwise route and returns south to the city centre via Blackweir instead of Cathays.

Amongst the place served (from south to north) are:

- Cardiff Castle
- Millennium Stadium
- The Hayes
- Cardiff Central Library
- Cardiff International Arena
- Cardiff Queen Street railway station
- Capitol Centre
- Cathays Park (National Museum Cardiff)
- Cathays railway station
- Cardiff University
- Birchgrove railway station
- Thornhill Crematorium

During city centre closures on Friday and Saturday nights, the route does not circle the city centre, but instead operates directly between The Hayes and Queen Street Station, not stopping at Kingsway, Dumfries Place or Westgate Street.

== See also ==
- Baycar
- Bus transport in Cardiff
- Transport in Cardiff
