= Capital City Red =

Bus service in Cardiff

Capital City Red (Route 17/18)

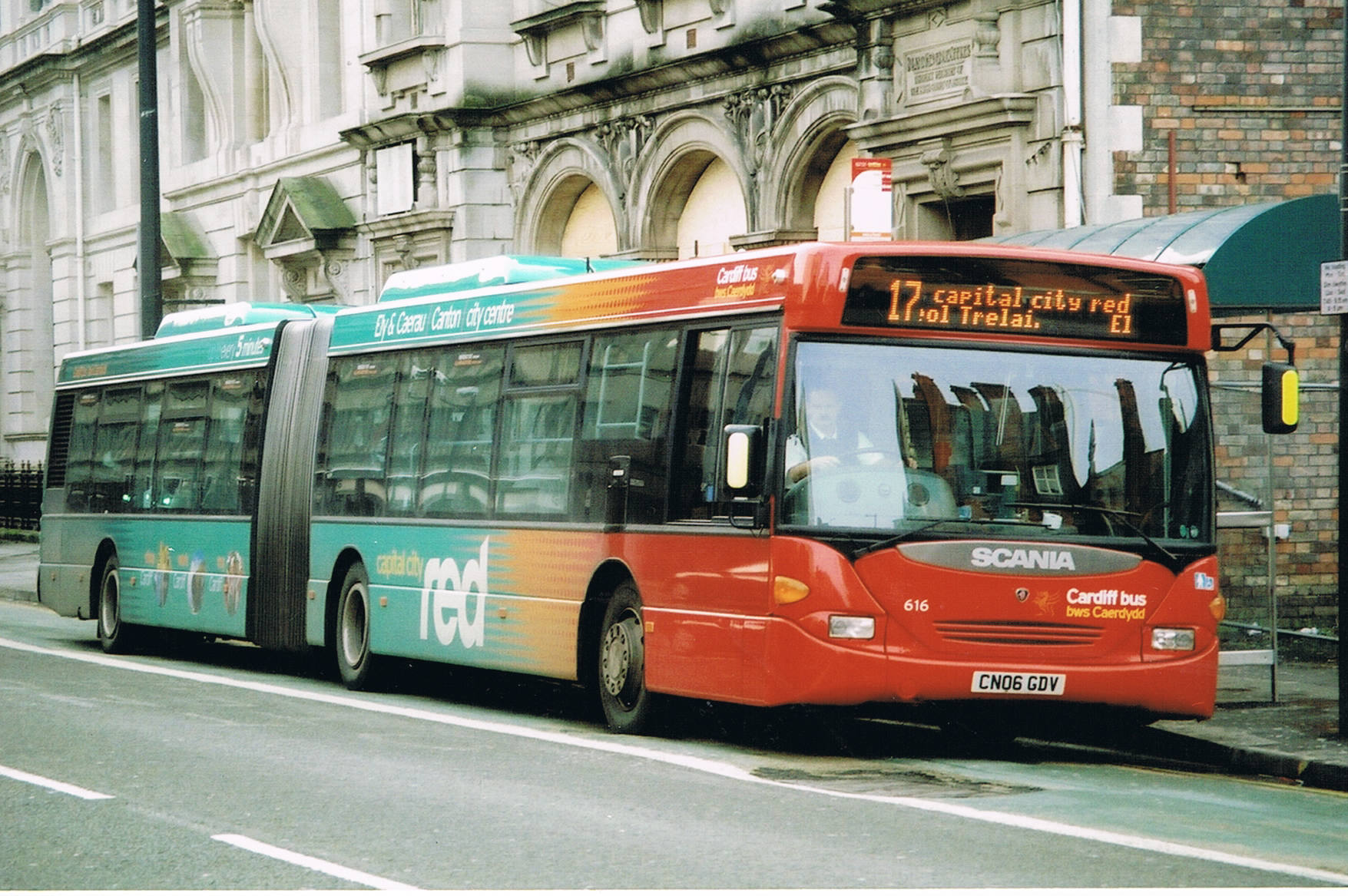

Overview
- Operator: Cardiff Bus
- Vehicle: Yutong E12
- Peak vehicle requirement: 28

Route
- Start: Westgate Street
- Via: Cowbridge Road East, Canton, Victoria Park, Ely, Caerau, Ely, Victoria Park, Canton, Cowbridge Road East, Central Station
- End: Westgate Street
- Length: 9.4 miles (15 km)

Service
- Frequency: Every 5-10 minutes
- Journey time: 65-70 minutes

Capital City Red was the branding of bus services 17 and 18 in Cardiff. The route runs from the city centre to the west of the city, serving the Canton, Ely and Caerau districts.

The service forms part of the wider Cardiff Bus network and is one of three services to initially have a unique branding, along with Baycar and Capital City Green. Their fleet includes 55 Yutong E12 electric buses.

The service was introduced in 2006 to improve infrastructure on the route, and with the aim to make the corridor the first Statutory Quality Bus Partnership in Wales.

== History ==
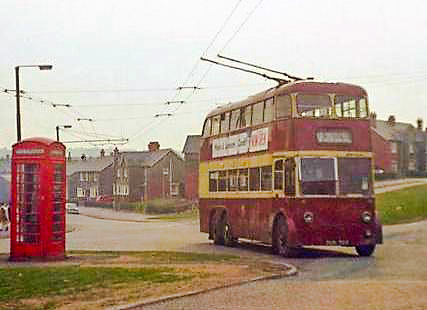
A Cardiff trolleybus in Ely (1969)

In 1955, the furthest and final extension of Cardiff's trolleybus system came to Ely, where city trams had never run. In 1959, the Cardiff Corporation Transport trolleybus routes that were operating in Ely and Caerau were the 10 A/B (Ely – Canton – City Centre) and the motorbus service 39(A) (Ely Bridge, City Centre – Rhiwbina).

The transition to motorbuses began in Cardiff began in 1962 and was completed by 1970 and the city has been served by motor buses ever since.

== Vehicles ==
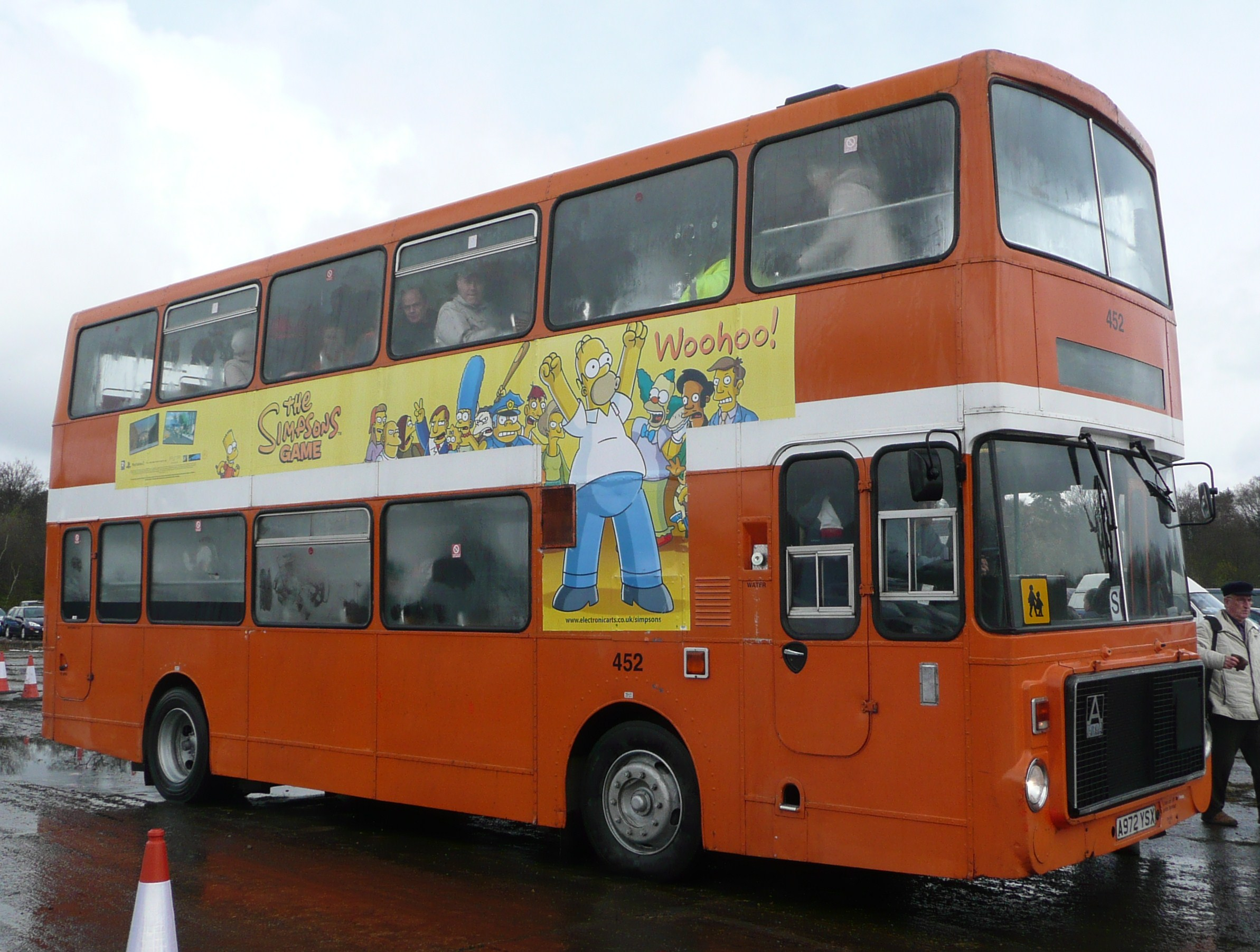
Volvo Ailsa, with Cardiff Bus livery, at the 2008 Cobham bus rally.

The Scania Omnicity articulated vehicles have their own red and green livery, are equipped with seats with leather headrests, air-conditioning, reserved spaces for buggies and wheelchairs, CCTV, on-bus screens with local travel information and BBC News 24 bulletins, hearing induction loop and next stop information. Cardiff Bus has 19 of such vehicles in their fleet valued at £235,000 each.

In the past, the vehicles have become stuck on the route due to heavy snow.

Before the 17 and 18 routes became branded as Capital City Red, Cardiff Bus operated its double decker orange Volvo Ailsa vehicles on the route.

== Route ==
The 9.4 mile long route stops outside Cardiff Central bus station and Westgate Street in the city centre before heading westbound towards the suburbs. It follows Cowbridge Road East through Canton, Cardiff into Ely and Caerau. The services diverge at Ely Library with the 17 following a clockwise route and the 18 following an anticlockwise route before the two routes meet again and return to the city centre via Canton.

Amongst the place served (from east to west) are:

- Central rail/bus stations
- Millennium Stadium
- Cardiff Arms Park
- Animal Wall
- St David's Hospital
- Canton Library
- Canton Police Station
- Chapter Arts Centre
- Victoria Park
- Ely Bridge
- Ely Library
- Western Leisure Centre
- Glamorgan Wanderers

== Police operations ==
South Wales Police have used vehicles on this route as a decoy in an attempt to catch people who throw stones at the buses, after an increase in such attacks had made Cardiff Bus think about ceasing operations on the route. Six undercover officers posed as ordinary passengers on the bus, and since the operation began two youths have taken into custody and 17 have been referred for anti-social behaviour orders.

== See also ==
- Baycar
- Bus transport in Cardiff
- Transport in Cardiff
- Articulated buses in the United Kingdom
