= Gabalfa railway station =

Proposed railway station in Wales

Coordinates: 51°30′04″N 3°12′05″W

Gabalfa

General information
- Location: Gabalfa, Cardiff; Wales
- Owner: Transport for Wales
- Operator: Transport for Wales
- Manager: Transport for Wales
- Line: Merthyr
- Platforms: 2

Key dates
- 2028: Opening
Location

Gabalfa is a proposed railway station on the Merthyr line in the Gabalfa district of Cardiff, Wales. The station would be on the South Wales Metro and be part of the Wales & Borders franchise. It is planned to open in 2028.

It will be located on an old coal yard next to the existing railway. This followed significant local petitioning for a railway station from Gabalfa and Mynachdy. A station in the Gabalfa ward was first proposed by Cardiff County Council in 2000.

Preceding station	National Rail	Following station
Cathays	Transport for Wales; Merthyr Line	Llandaf

== See also ==
- Proposed railway stations in Wales
- Transport in Cardiff
