= Mynachdy =

District of Cardiff, Wales

Coordinates: 51°30′9″N 3°11′57″W

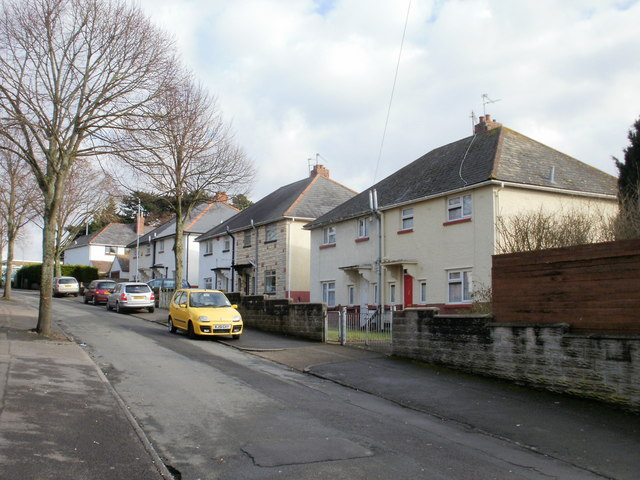
- Semi-detached houses on Caerleon Road, Mynachdy

- Location within Cardiff
- Principal area: Cardiff
- Preserved county: South Glamorgan
- Country: Wales
- Sovereign state: United Kingdom
- Post town: CARDIFF
- Dialling code: +44-29
- Police: South Wales
- Fire: South Wales
- Ambulance: Welsh
- UK Parliament: Cardiff North
- Senedd Cymru – Welsh Parliament: Cardiff North

Mynachdy (from Welsh 'monastery') is a district of the city of Cardiff, Wales. Mynachdy is situated between Gabalfa, Birchgrove and Cathays. Mynachdy is often paired with neighbouring Gabalfa, and shares its councillors. It is close to a few universities such as Cardiff University and the Royal Welsh College of Music & Drama, as well as student accommodation.

== Name ==
The word "mynachdy" comes from the Welsh words "mynach" (monk) and "tŷ" (house). This probably refers to Llys Talybont, a manor building in the modern area of Mynachdy that was owned by the monks of Llantarnam Abbey.

== Mynachdy Institute ==
The Mynachdy Institute is a community centre in Mynachdy. There have been many threats of closure, with plans to replace it with student flats. However, after its initial closure, a successful community movement regained control of the Institute from Cardiff Council.

== Transport ==
The A470 North Road runs along Mynachdy's northeast side.

Mynachdy is bordered on its southwest side by a local railway line. There are plans under consideration to build the Gabalfa railway station on this line to serve Mynachdy and neighbouring Gabalfa.
