= All Nations Centre =

Conference and events centre in Cardiff

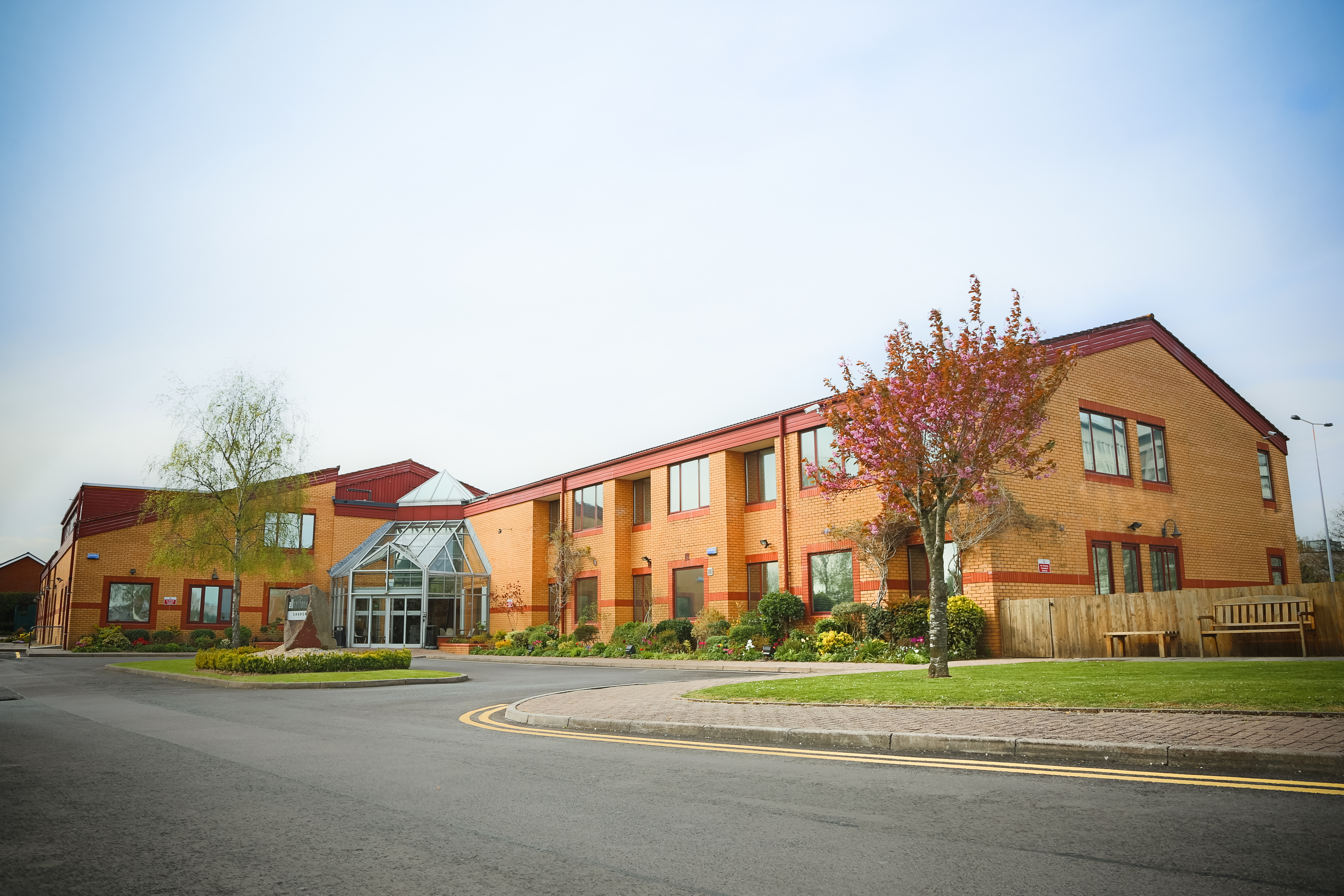
- The Centre in 2015
- Interactive map of All Nations Centre
- Address: Sachville Avenue; Cardiff; CF14 3NY
- Location: Heath, Cardiff, Wales
- Coordinates: 51.5053°N 3.1922°W
- Owner: All Nations Church
- Operator: Kairos Ventures Limited

Construction
- Built: 1991

Website
- https://www.allnationscentre.com/

The All Nations Centre is a conference centre and events venue in the Gabalfa district of Cardiff, Wales. The centre is associated with and located in the same building as the All Nations Church which was established at the site in 1991. It frequently hosts events for public sector bodies and political groups.

== History ==
In 1991, the All Nations Church purchased the land where the centre is located, on Eastern Avenue (part of the main A48 road), opposite the University Hospital of Wales. The All Nations Centre was built to host church services and gatherings.

The All Nations church is a member of Ministries Without Borders, a grouping of evangelical churches.

== Conferences ==
The venue was opened in 2003 as a conference site as a joint venture by the All Nations Church and Kairos Ventures Limited. The venture sees profits from the business used by the church for its international evangelism.

The All Nations Centre is a regular host to Welsh organisations including NHS Wales, Public Health Wales, the Welsh Government and Cwm Taf Health Board, as well as for regular Cardiff Council procurement events. It hosts examinations and lectures for Cardiff University and the Open University, and was a venue for the 2013 International Conference on Human Trafficking.

In recent years the centre has been visited by Prince Charles, and has hosted the BBC flagship political debate programme, Question Time. It is frequently chosen by the Welsh Conservatives as the venue for its hustings and conferences, having previously hosted Prime Ministers David Cameron and Boris Johnson. The Welsh hustings for the 2019 Conservative Party leadership election were held at the centre.
