= Gabalfa =

District and community of Cardiff, Wales

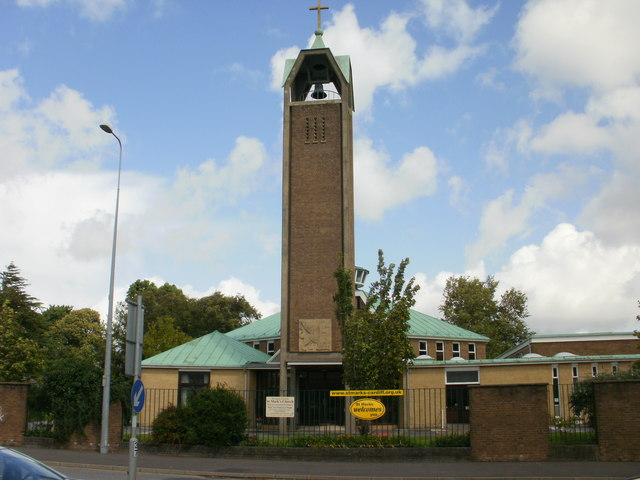
- St Mark's Church, Gabalfa

- Location within Cardiff
- Population: 8,790 (2011)
- Principal area: Cardiff
- Preserved county: South Glamorgan
- Country: Wales
- Sovereign state: United Kingdom
- Post town: CARDIFF
- Postcode district: CF14
- Dialling code: +44-29
- Police: South Wales
- Fire: South Wales
- Ambulance: Welsh
- UK Parliament: Cardiff North
- Senedd Cymru – Welsh Parliament: Cardiff North
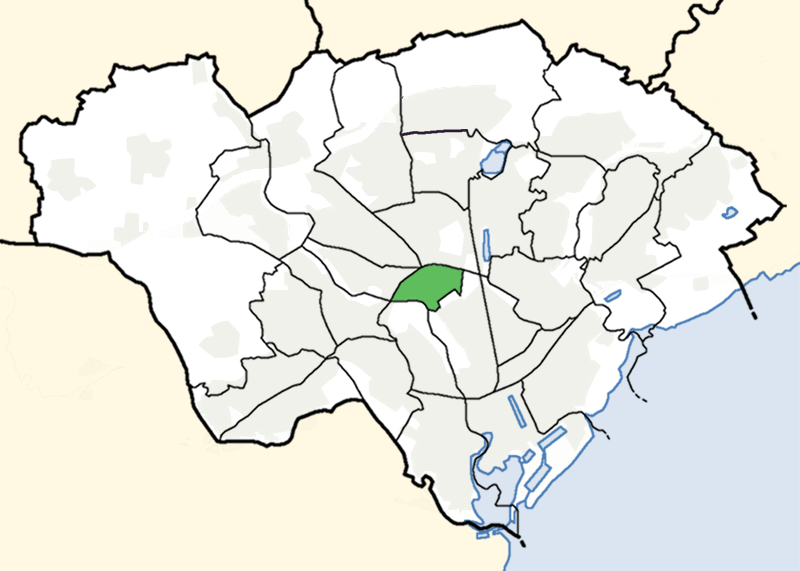
- List of places UK Wales Cardiff 51.500°N 3.204°W

Gabalfa (English: /ɡəˈbælvə/, Welsh pronunciation: [ɡaˈbalva]) is a district and community in the north of the city of Cardiff, capital of Wales. It is characterised by a four-lane flyover road at the Gabalfa Interchange, where the A48 road meets the A470 road (North Road) which leads from Cardiff to northern Wales, and the A469 road (Caerphilly Road).

The name is derived from the Welsh Ceubalfa, literally translated as 'place of the boat'. It was formerly the site of a ferry crossing across the River Taff, upon which a school is now built. The area was first heavily developed in the 1880s, with most of the characteristic terraced housing originating from the next 30 years of construction.

The area around St. Joseph's Church near to Companies House is known as 'the Colonies' due to a number of streets named after former British colonies, including Australia Road and Newfoundland Road.

== Education ==
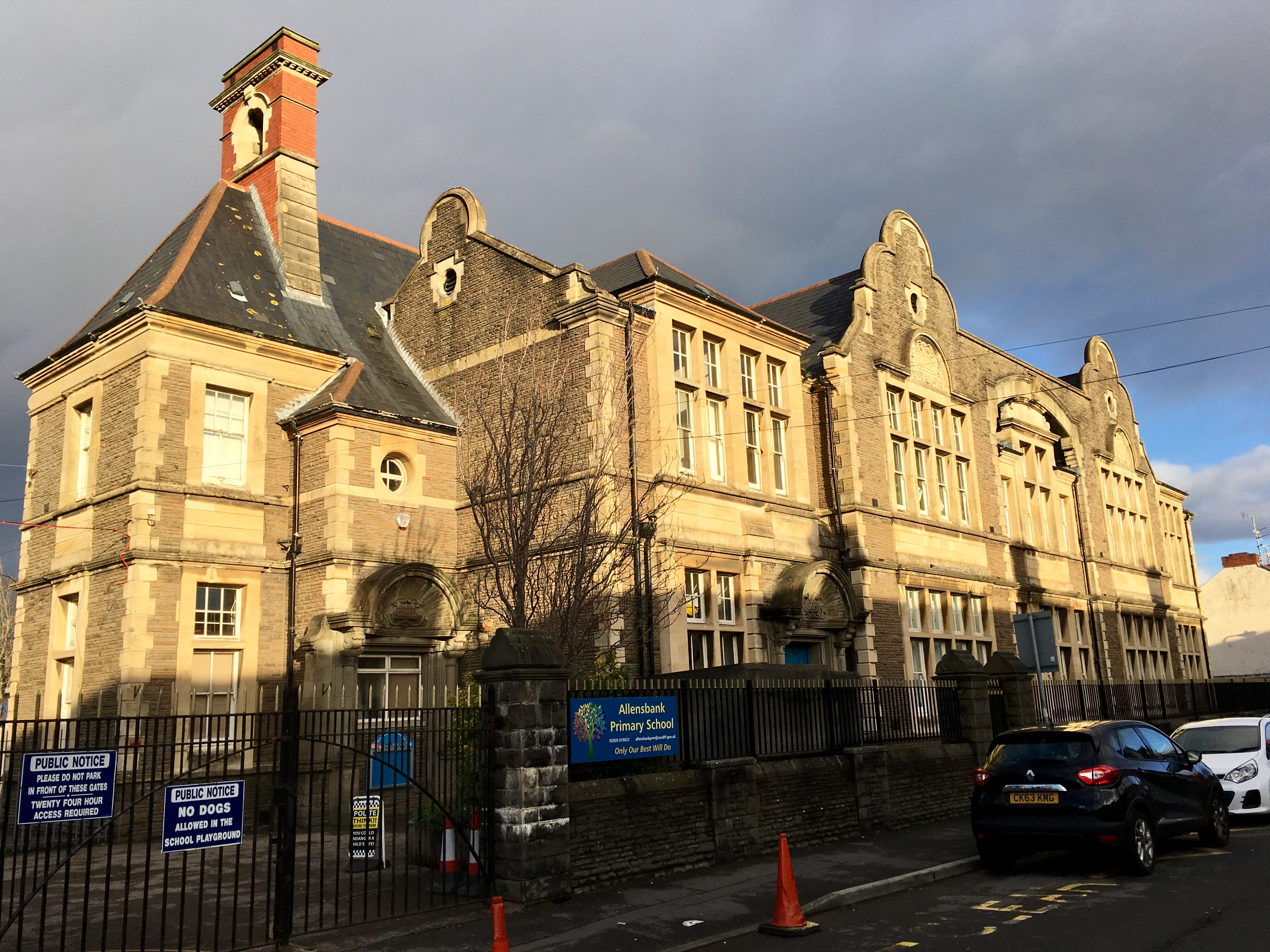
Junior Building, Allensbank Primary School

=== Primary ===
Gabalfa has three primary schools located within the ward:

- St. Joseph's (Roman Catholic) Primary School
- St. Monica's (Church in Wales) Primary School
- Ysgol Mynydd Bychan ('Heath School' in Welsh), which teaches in the Welsh medium

Gabalfa Primary School is not within modern Gabalfa but in neighbouring Llandaff North. Allensbank Primary School was previously in Gabalfa, but merged with Gladstone Primary School in Cathays to form Fairoak Primary School. Fairoak Primary School is the primary state school serving the Gabalfa ward.

=== High School ===
Gabalfa has one comprehensive school, Cathays High School, with around 900 students (mainly from outside Gabalfa).

=== University ===
Gabalfa has a high student population. There are several halls of residence for Cardiff University in the area, housing about 3,100 students, some 10% of the student body. Liberty House serves mainly medical and nursing students at the nearly University Hospital of Wales. In addition, many students live in privately rented accommodation in the area.

== Places of worship ==
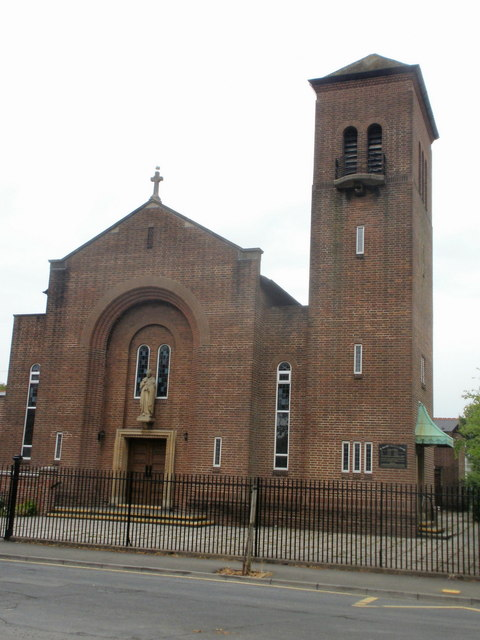
St. Joseph's Catholic Church

Churches in Gabalfa include St Mark's on North Road (Church in Wales), St Joseph's on New Zealand Road (Roman Catholic), and the All Nations Church on Eastern Avenue (Ministries Without Borders, co-located with the All Nations Centre).

== Politics ==
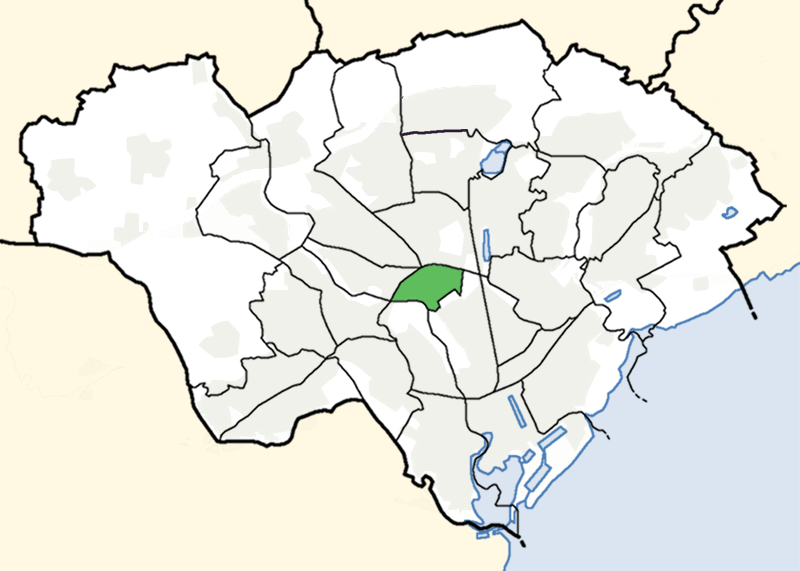
Gabalfa electoral ward of Cardiff

The electoral ward of Gabalfa lies within the parliamentary constituency of Cardiff North, which has been represented since 2017 by Welsh Labour MP Anna McMorrin. In the Senedd, Cardiff North is represented by Welsh Labour MS Julie Morgan.

There is no community council for the area.

Gabalfa was served by two Cardiff councillors: Ed Bridges (Liberal Democrat), elected in 2004, and Gareth Holden, elected in 2012. Holden was elected as a Liberal Democrat but resigned from the party in 2013. He lost to a Liberal Democrat candidate in the May 2017 election. The ward is currently served by Rhys Taylor and Ashley Wood (2019).

Gabalfa is bounded by Birchgrove and Heath to the north, Cathays and Maindy to the south, and Llandaff North to the northwest.

== Transport ==
The area is known for the Gabalfa Interchange (or Gabalfa flyover), where the A48 Eastern Avenue, A470 North Road, and A469 Whitchurch Road (south)/Caerphilly Road (north) meet. The interchange is known for its suicides and suicide attempts, although efforts have been made to improve this, with signs to suicide prevention charities now clearly visible on the pedestrian bridge over Eastern Avenue.

=== Bus ===
Cardiff Bus' service 35 bus circles the area before heading to Cardiff Bay via Cathays and Central station. Services 1/2 Bay Circle run along Western Avenue towards Heath or Llandaff. Additionally, the following services stop at the Gabalfa Interchange:

- 8 (University Hospital of Wales) or (Cathays-Roath-Central Station-Grangetown-Cardiff Bay)
- 9 (University Hospital of Wales) or (International Sports Village)
- 21 (Rhiwbina-Coryton-Whitchurch) or (Central Stn)
- 23 (Whitchurch-Coryton-Rhiwbina) or (Central Stn)
- 24 (Whitchurch-Llandaff North-Pontcanna-Llandaff)
- 25 (Central Stn)
- 27 Capital City Green (Heath-Birchgrove-Thornhill) or (Central Stn)
- 35 (Gabalfa) or (Cathays-Central Stn-Cardiff Bay)

=== Rail ===
There are no railway stations located within Gabalfa, although a new railway station serving the ward was proposed by the County Council in 2000. The nearest railway stations are Heath Low Level and Heath High Level to the north-west, Cathays to the south and Llandaf to the north-east.

=== Walking and cycling ===
The Taff Trail, a long-distance footpath and cycle route that runs along the River Taff, is connected to Gabalfa by Llys Tal-y-Bont Road.

In 2023, a new cycle path was completed along Allensbank Road on the edge of Gabalfa, as part of Cardiff's Cycleway 1. To promote cycling and improve safety, in recent years councillors and residents have campaigned with some success for traffic calming measures, such as Gabalfa becoming a 20 miles per hour (32 km/h) zone, raised crossings being installed, and curbs being narrowed.

Gabalfa is within a 50-minute walk or a 10-minute cycle of the city centre.

== Gallery ==
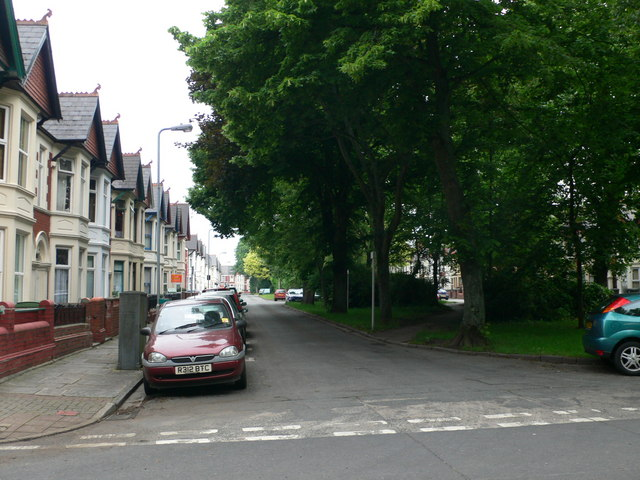
Africa Gardens

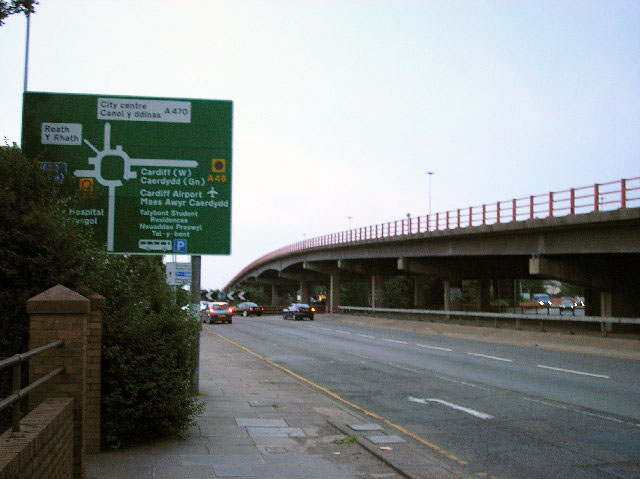
Part of the Gabalfa Interchange and flyover

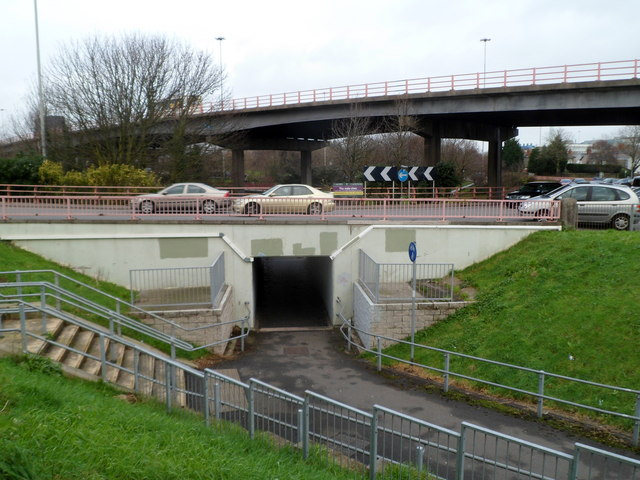
Subway under Gabalfa Interchange
