= Cathays =

District and community in Cardiff, Wales

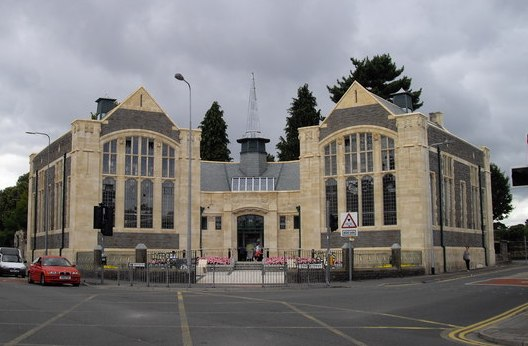
- Cathays Library, a Carnegie library built in 1906

- Location within Cardiff
- Population: 20,121 (2011)
- OS grid reference: ST181780
- Community: Cathays
- Principal area: Cardiff
- Preserved county: South Glamorgan
- Country: Wales
- Sovereign state: United Kingdom
- Post town: CARDIFF
- Postcode district: CF10
- Postcode district: CF24
- Dialling code: 029
- Police: South Wales
- Fire: South Wales
- Ambulance: Welsh
- UK Parliament: Cardiff South and Penarth
- Senedd Cymru – Welsh Parliament: Caerdydd Penarth
- List of places UK Wales Cardiff 51.496°N 3.182°W Map of the community

Cathays (/kəˈteɪz/ kə-TAYZ; standardised Welsh: Cathays; sometimes Y Waun Ddyfal, 'the constant meadow') is a district and community in the centre of Cardiff, capital of Wales. It is an old suburb of Cardiff established in 1875. It is densely populated and contains many Victorian terraced houses. The area falls into the Cathays ward. It is the third most populous community in Cardiff, having a population of 18,002 in 2011.

== Etymology ==
The area that is now Cathays was formerly known in Welsh as Y Waun Ddyfal and in English as Little Heath (to distinguish it from Great Heath).

The name Cathays first appeared in 1699 as Catt Hays and originally denoted a tract of common land north-east of Cardiff, now represented by Cathays Park. The second element is a derivative of Old English haga, meaning 'park or enclosure', while the first element has been variously traced to the Welsh word cad, meaning 'battle', and the Old English word catt, meaning 'wildcat'.

== History ==
By the medieval period farmland outside the old Cardiff Castle, Cathays takes in the northern limit of mediaeval Cardiff — marked by the crossroads of Fairoak Road and Crwys Road.

After John Stuart, 1st Marquess of Bute, married Charlotte Hickman-Windsor (daughter of Herbert Windsor, 2nd Viscount Windsor) on 12 November 1766, he inherited great further lands, including in Cathays to the north of his existing estate which he had partially developed. He then bought other properties and farms to the north and east, including what became Cathays Park. There he built Cathays House at a cost of £40,000 and at further cost landscaped Cathays Park. After his son took over the title he preferred to live in Cardiff Castle, so demolished the house in 1815, and turned Cathays Park into purely enclosed parkland for grazing.

=== Suburb of Cardiff ===
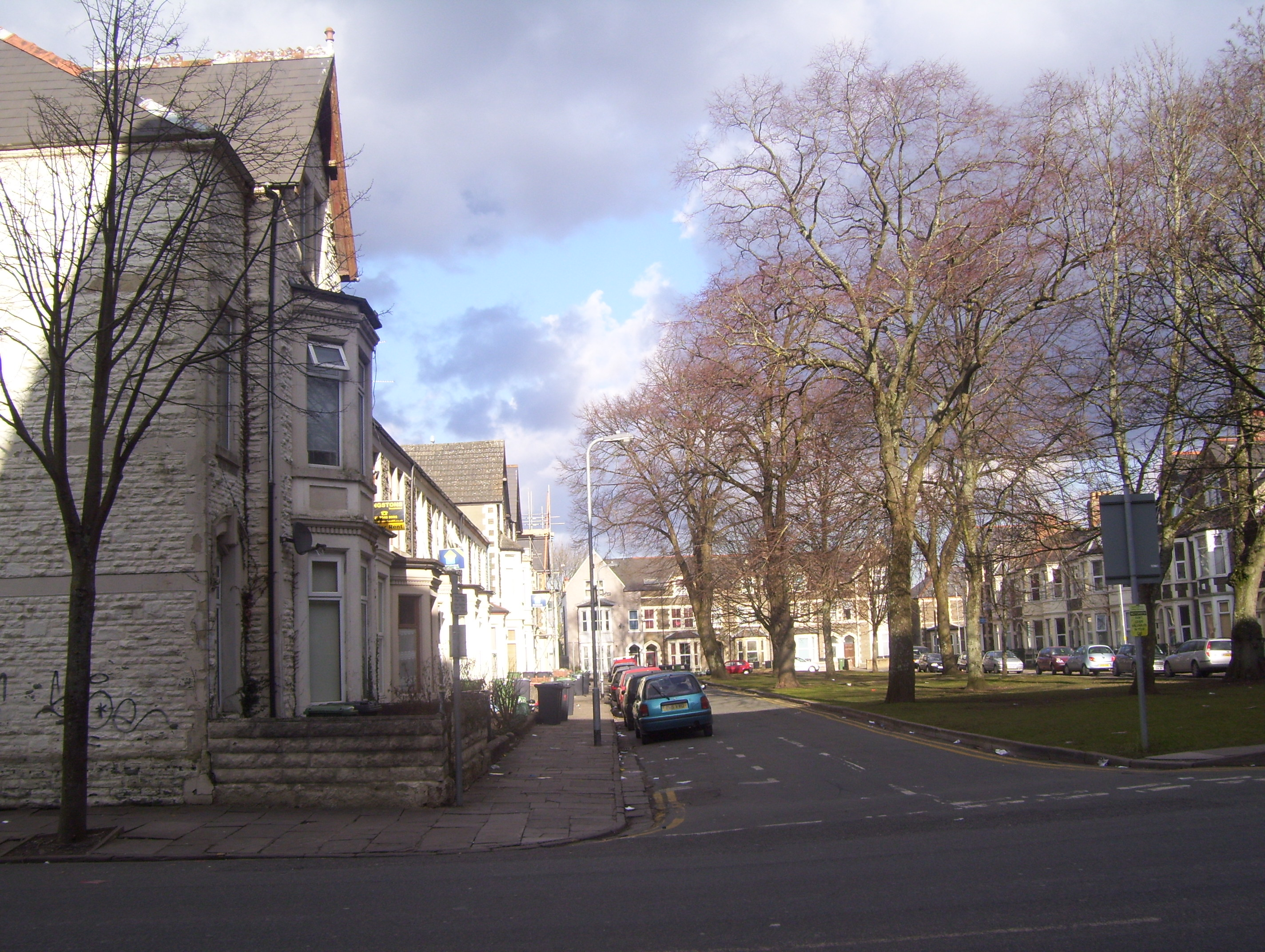
Ruthin Gardens, opposite Cathays railway station

Following the 2nd Marquis' development of Cardiff Docks, and the resultant number of new workers flocking to Cardiff, in 1875 the then rural Cathays became a suburb of Cardiff. At that time, a few streets led off Woodville Road and Cathays Terrace. By 1900 the urbanisation of Cathays was virtually completed. Allensbank and Wedal farms survived briefly. In 1914 they became no more than local place names.

Maindy Barracks opened in 1871. With United States Army troops temporarily stationed in transit in Cardiff during both World War I and World War II, the footpath between Gelligaer Street and New Zealand Road became known as "BURMA Road" (from the phrase "Be Undressed and Ready My Angel"), as they came to meet prostitutes.

== Governance ==
Cathays does not have a community council.

The electoral ward of Cathays includes both the Cathays and Castle communities and elects four councillors to Cardiff Council.

== Buildings and structures in Cathays ==
From 1840, the Taff Vale Railway company developed a railway line through Cathays, where they also developed the Cathays railway works. A major carriage and wagon construction and maintenance facility, it and the associated locomotive depot were taken over and maintained by the Great Western Railway. After nationalisation in 1946, British Railways sold the business and leased the site to the Pullman Company Ltd, where they maintained their carriages until the 1970s. The depot was closed from the late 1960s, and was later redeveloped for buildings now used by Cardiff University. The carriage and wagon works was redeveloped in the early 2000s, and now houses a Lidl store and a student accommodation block. Cathays railway station opened in 1983, adjacent to the students' union building which encloses the railway tracks.

In 1875, Nazareth House was opened to provide accommodation for orphans and the elderly. A popular local charity, one of its many benefactors was the boxer Jim Driscoll, who, since his burial in Cathays cemetery in 1925, has had his grave tended by the nuns of Nazareth House.

In 1898, John Crichton-Stuart, 3rd Marquess of Bute sold a large piece of land to Cardiff Council for the building of a new City Hall, imposing strict conditions regarding its purpose and where development could take place. As a result, City Hall was built as far south in the purchased block of land as possible, and the residual area to its north used for civic, cultural and educational purposes only. City Hall cost £129,000 to build; it was constructed between 1901 and 1904 and opened in 1906, the year after Cardiff was awarded city status.

The land purchased by the council to the north of the city hall now houses:

- Cardiff University, which moved from Newport Road to Cathays Park in 1909
- National Museum Cardiff, opened in 1927
- Welsh National War Memorial, unveiled in 1928
- Crown Buildings, the Welsh Government's main offices in Cardiff; the largest building in Cathays Park
- Temple of Peace and Health (usually known as the Temple of Peace), opened in 1938

Maindy Pool was a clay pit that had gradually filled with water. After the death by drowning of ten children and adults, it was filled in by using it as a rubbish tip. In 1948 the building of Maindy Stadium began on the same site, completed in 1951, which held cycling races in the 1958 British Empire and Commonwealth Games. When the stadium was closed and replaced with a leisure centre, part of the site became a swimming pool.

Cathays Library is a Carnegie library built in 1906 and refurbished in 2009–10.

Companies House, which holds the registration records of all companies registered in England or Wales, has its headquarters in Cathays.

== Today ==
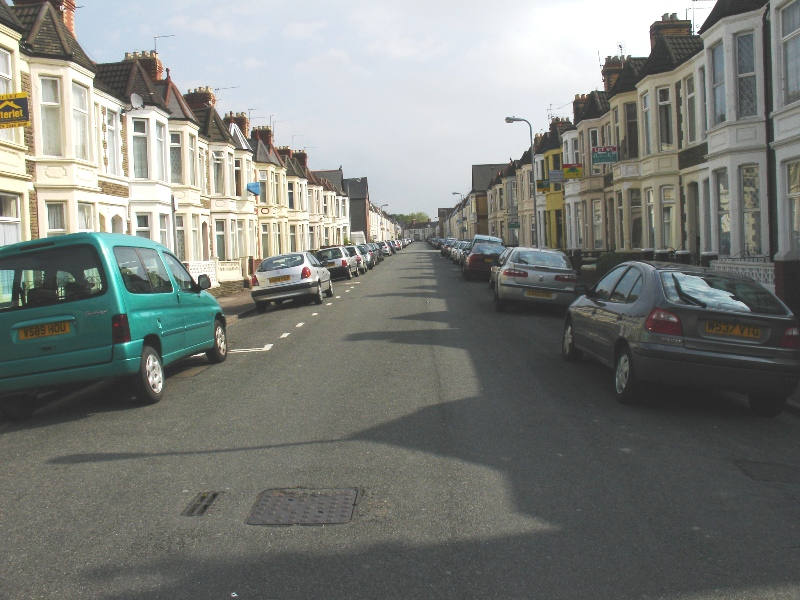
Tewkesbury Street in Cathays

The area of Cathays, given its proximity to most of Cardiff University's teaching sites and the University Hospital of Wales, has seen a dramatic fall in owner-occupation, with a high proportion of houses in multiple occupation (HMOs) which are let through private landlords and letting agencies to the large student population. 2012 figures available under the Freedom of Information Act show that over 70% of the houses in Cathays were then HMOs. The buy-to-let market has deterred young couples, families and first-time buyers from setting up home in the area.

Cathays High School is an 11–18 mixed comprehensive school that started as a boys' grammar school in 1903 and became a comprehensive high school in 1973.

Despite the urbanisation of Cathays, there is extensive parkland around the civic centre, including Gorsedd Gardens, Queen Alexandra Gardens, Bute Park and Blackweir.

Of more than 8570 wards in the 2011 census across England and Wales, Cathays ranked 8th lowest in the number of retired people and second lowest in Wales (behind Menai, a ward associated with Bangor University).

2011 Electoral Ward	adults	retired	as a % of adults
Cathays	18,693	370	1.98%

== Transport ==
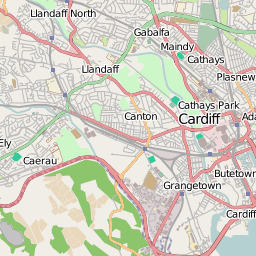
Map of the area around Cathays

The area is served by Cathays railway station in the east, with frequent services south to Cardiff Queen Street and Cardiff Central or north to Merthyr Tydfil and Treherbert via Pontypridd. Cardiff Bus provides many services in the area. The following bus services run along North Road (in the west), going to the city centre in the reverse direction:

- 21 (Rhiwbina-Pantmawr-Whitchurch)
- 23 (Whitchurch-Pantmawr-Rhiwbina)
- 24 (Whitchurch-Llandaff North-Llandaff-City Centre)
- 25 (City Centre)
- 27 Capital City Green (Birchgrove-Thornhill)

Likewise, the following services run north along Crwys Road and/or Whitchurch Road (in the east):

- 1 Bay Circle (Roath-Tremorfa-Splott-Adamsdown-City Centre-Bay-Grangetown-Canton-Fairwater-Llandaff-Gabalfa)
- 2 Bay Circle (As 1 but reversed)
- 8/9/9A (Heath-University Hospital of Wales) or (City Centre-Grangetown-Cardiff Bay)
- 35 (Gabalfa) or (City Centre-Cardiff Bay)

The area is close to the busy Gabalfa Interchange, connecting it with the A48 and the M4 motorway.
