= Baycar =

Bus service in Cardiff

6 baycar

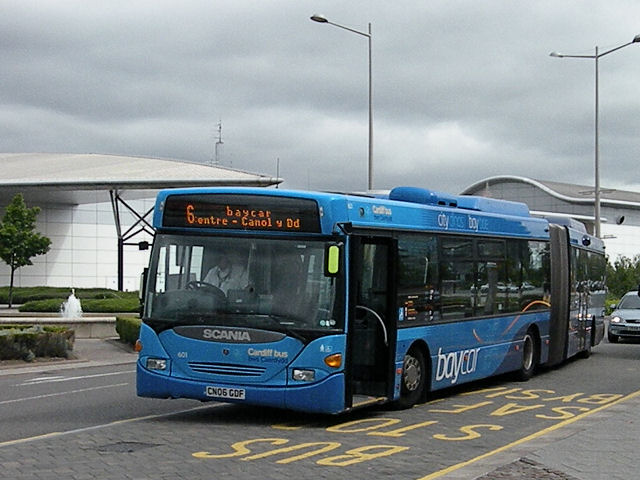

Overview
- Operator: Cardiff Bus
- Vehicle: Scania OmniCity articulated bus Alexander Dennis Enviro200
- Peak vehicle requirement: 4 (2006)
- Status: Debranded
- Began service: 28 May 2006; 20 years ago
- Ended service: June 2023; 3 years ago

Route
- Locale: Cardiff city centre Cardiff Bay
- Start: Porth Teigr or Wales Millennium Centre
- Via: Butetown
- End: Wales Millennium Centre or Porth Teigr

Service
- Frequency: 10 mins (15–20 mins off-peak)
- Journey time: 34 mins

Baycar (also styled as baycar) was the route brand used by Cardiff Bus for the route 6 bus service connecting Cardiff city centre and Cardiff Bay between 2006 and 2023. Until the dedicated vehicles for the service were withdrawn, the Baycar used to be themed with its own branded vehicles, bus shelters and advertisement boards. The service still runs as of August 2026, however no branded vehicles are used on the service.

== History ==
The Baycar service was introduced alongside the Capital City Red on 28 May 2006 amid a wider investment in Scania OmniCity articulated buses for the city. Baycar intended to connect the city centre to the old Cardiff docklands redeveloped to create Cardiff Bay, a primarily entertainment and retail area. A launch event for these services marked the return of buses to Queen Street for the first time since the shopping street was pedestrianised in 1975.

Under a 5-year contract, the Baycar service was subsidised £200,000 per month by Cardiff Council, which owns Cardiff Bus, and by the Welsh Government. Despite reports of low patronage and complaints about traffic congestion outside of peak times, according to Cardiff Bus, the service was being used by 39,000 passengers each month by July 2007.

The Baycar service came second under the Best Example of Participation in Transport category, beaten only by consumer watchdog Bus Users UK Cymru Wales, at the Chartered Institute of Logistics and Transport Wales' National Transport Awards in May 2007.

On 29 January 2022, the articulated OmniCitys used on the service were withdrawn and replaced by a conventional branded Alexander Dennis Enviro200. Baycar no longer operates using a dedicated, branded vehicle. Instead, the route is assigned unbranded Yutong E12 battery electric buses which were delivered in March 2024.

== Route ==
Upon its launch, the Baycar operated from the Wales Millennium Centre to the northern end of the city centre, running from around 06:00 until 23:30 on Monday to Saturdays and running from 08:00 on Sundays and Bank Holidays. Buses ran every ten minutes in the daytime on Mondays to Fridays, every fifteen minutes Saturday and Sunday daytimes and every twenty minutes in late evenings on Mondays to Fridays. Amongst the landmarks and attractions served were Cardiff Bay, the Wales Millennium Centre, the Red Dragon Centre, Cardiff City Centre, the St David's Centre and the Cardiff Central Library.

Services were extended during morning and afternoon peak times, with the northern end of the route extended to run through to Cathays Park (the Civic Centre) and the south of the route extended to run to Porth Teigr. Due to recently adjusted bridge height clearances on the route, double-decker buses are unable to operate the Baycar's route.

From 11 September 2011, service changes took place to serve Cathays Park all day and run more directly to the Wales Millennium Centre (WMC), with the other end of the route being served by a new road bridge into Porth Teigr. The aim of the service changes was to connect the offices of the Welsh Government at Cathays Park with the Senedd building, as well as to also serve the BBC's new Roath Lock TV studios. The daytime frequency of the service on Mondays to Fridays fell from 10 to 12 minutes from June 2016.

Due to a serious financial shortfall at Cardiff Bus, in January 2019, the Baycar was significantly shortened to run only between the Civic Centre and Canal Street to the Millennium Centre, with services to Porth Teigr being dropped. Normal operating days incorporated one bus running back and forth forming a half-hourly service from each end.

Amid the gradual reintroduction of bus services following the COVID-19 pandemic, the Baycar route was revised in June 2021 to start on the Kingsway to serve Cardiff Castle, Bute Park and the National Museum of Wales.

== Vehicles ==
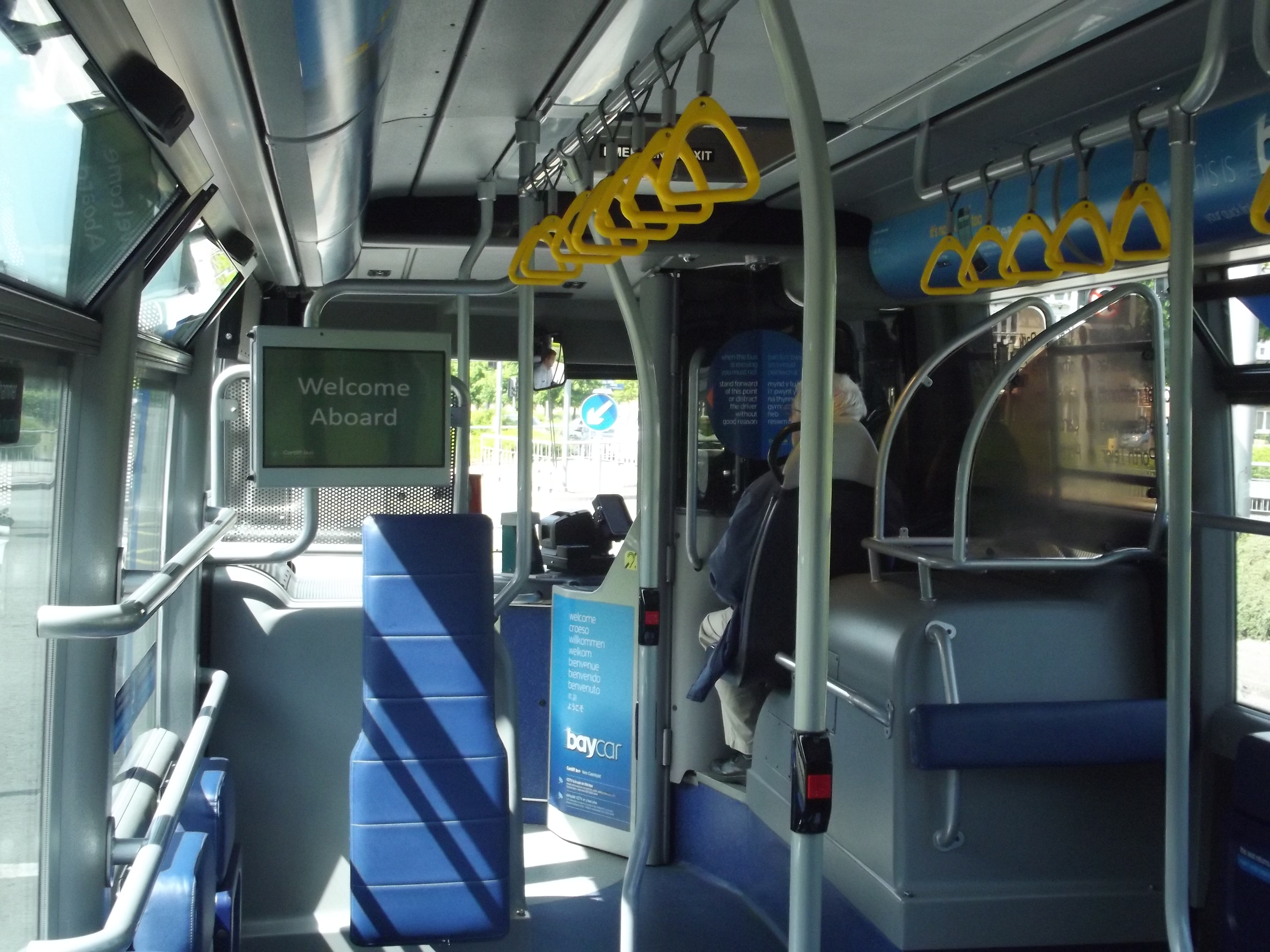
Interior of a Baycar OmniCity in June 2015

Between 2006 and 2022, Baycar was ran with a fleet of four articulated Scania OmniCitys painted in a distinct blue, bay-themed livery designed by Best Impressions and capable of carrying 133 passengers. Similar in specification to the Capital City Red OmniCitys, these were equipped with seats incorporating leather headrests, air conditioning, reserved spaces for wheelchairs and pushchairs, twelve CCTV cameras around the bus, free WiFi, passenger information screens showing local travel information, next stop announcements and diversion information as well as BBC News 24 bulletins, and an audio induction loop. The buses could also be tracked in real time at stops in the city centre via a satellite GPS tracking system.

The OmniCitys were given a mid-life refurbishment in 2013, being given a revised route-branded livery and having their interiors reupholstered. As part of The Guide Dogs for the Blind Association's 'Talking Bus' campaign for audio-visual announcements on all buses and coaches in the United Kingdom, Gavin & Stacey actor Ruth Jones (in character as Nessa Jenkins) and singer-songwriter Cerys Matthews provided voiceovers for next-stop announcements on the Baycar in 2014.

Following the withdrawal of the OmniCitys in 2022, the route was served using a single route-branded Alexander Dennis Enviro200. One Baycar OmniCity was preserved by a group of bus enthusiasts following its withdrawal but was subsequently scrapped a few months later.

=== Demonstrators ===
Baycar has also seen different types of buses demonstrated on the service. Prior to purchasing the OmniCity artics, Cardiff Bus evaluated a Mercedes-Benz Citaro artic on both Baycar and the Capital City Red. In May 2013, the service took use of a Caetano EcoCity bodied MAN fuel cell bus, and five years later in May 2018, Cardiff's first battery-electric bus, in the form of a Volvo 7900e demonstrator equipped with a pantograph charger, was operated on the service for eight weeks.

== See also ==
- Capital City Red, Baycar's sister service serving Ely, Cardiff and Canton
- FTR, a similar articulated bus service introduced by FirstBus in England and Wales in 2006
- Bus transport in Cardiff
- Articulated buses in the United Kingdom
