= Articulated buses in the United Kingdom =

Type of single-deck bus used in the United Kingdom

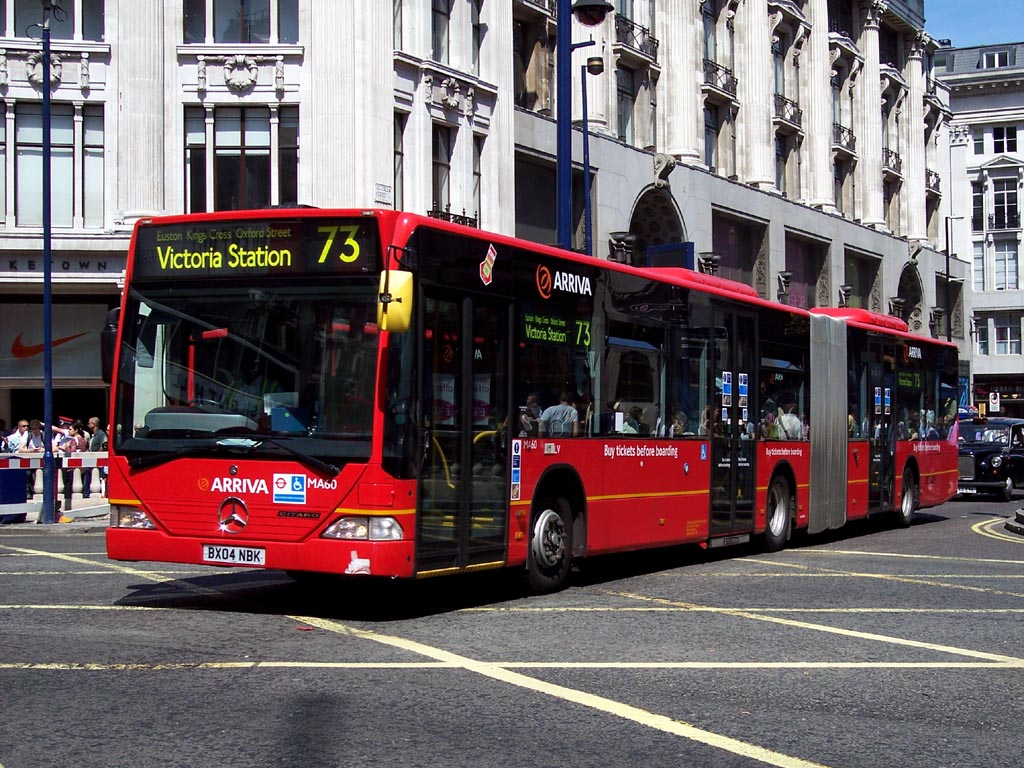
Mercedes-Benz O530 Citaro G in London

Articulated buses, colloquially known as "bendy buses", were rarely used in the United Kingdom compared to other countries, until the turn of the millennium. This was due to a preference for the double-decker bus for use on high capacity routes. In June 2006, there were over 500 articulated buses in the United Kingdom, although they were still heavily outnumbered by double deckers. The majority of this fleet was used in London, although these buses would be withdrawn by end of 2011.

== History ==
Until 1980 articulated buses were illegal for British roads due to their length. Following an exemption, the first trials in the UK used vehicles by MAN and Leyland-DAB.

=== MAN Bendibus, 1979 ===
The first to carry passengers on a scheduled service (albeit without charge, due to regulations) was a MAN Bendibus demonstrator with City of Oxford Motor Services in late 1979. The South Yorkshire Passenger Transport Executive (SYPTE) purchased ten MANs off lease in 1979, in an order split between MAN and Leyland-DAB articulated buses. Only five of the MANs were delivered and no further orders followed, with the buses returning off lease in 1981. These were the first articulated buses to be purchased by the PTE and the services were branded as the 'Cityliner', painted in a white, green and red livery.

=== Leyland-DAB, 1979 ===
Leyland-DAB articulated buses, built by the British-Danish joint venture, Leyland-DAB bus, in Denmark, were the most intensively trialled first-generation vehicles introduced to the UK. Four models of their National bodied buses were imported, and used on extended trial by South Yorkshire PTE in 1979, returned to the lessor in 1981. These vehicles wore a green, red and cream livery, and while in SYPTE service, were also demonstrated to other UK operators including Maidstone Borough Council Transport. Four examples was also purchased by private London operator Capital Citybus in 1994 from British Airways, receiving route blinds and markings for Red Arrow service. Ultimately, Capital Citybus did not gain the contract, and the Leyland-DABs were never used.

Two of these National types were later sold to McGill's Bus Services of Barrhead originally for its Barrhead-Paisley-Renfrew service, and later for its Barrhead-Glasgow service after a weight limit prevented their continued use on the Paisley service, with the others going to Hampshire Bus in Winchester, where they could be seen plying between there, Chandlers Ford and Southampton. Some later saw use as airport buses with British Airways, and then as non-PSV exhibit buses (in 2008).

Following the trials and demonstrations, no UK operators decided to place orders for the Leyland DABs, except for South Yorkshire Transport in 1985, the bus operating company now divested from the SYPTE. SYT placed an order for 13 buses of the DAB bodied type, ten of which saw service both a blue and cream liveried City Clipper circular service, while three wore branding for the X91 Fastline route. These buses survived privatisation of the passenger transport executives and saw service with the privatised operator Mainline Buses in Sheffield and Rotherham lasting in Mainline service until 1999. One of these buses were loaned for demonstration to London Buses' Selkent division in 1992, operating predominantly on route 180 from Catford garage, having previously been demonstrated with Irish state operator CIÉ.

=== Mercedes Benz O405, 1992 ===
A single Alexander-bodied articulated Mercedes-Benz O405G was delivered to Grampian Regional Transport, the forerunner of FirstGroup, in November 1992. Assigned the fleet number RT1 and cherished registration K1 GRT, the 17.6 metres (58 ft) bus featured air conditioning and on-board passenger information as well as a capacity for 60 seated and 50 standing passengers, and would survive as a unique member of the First Aberdeen fleet as fleet number 10046.

== Modern era ==
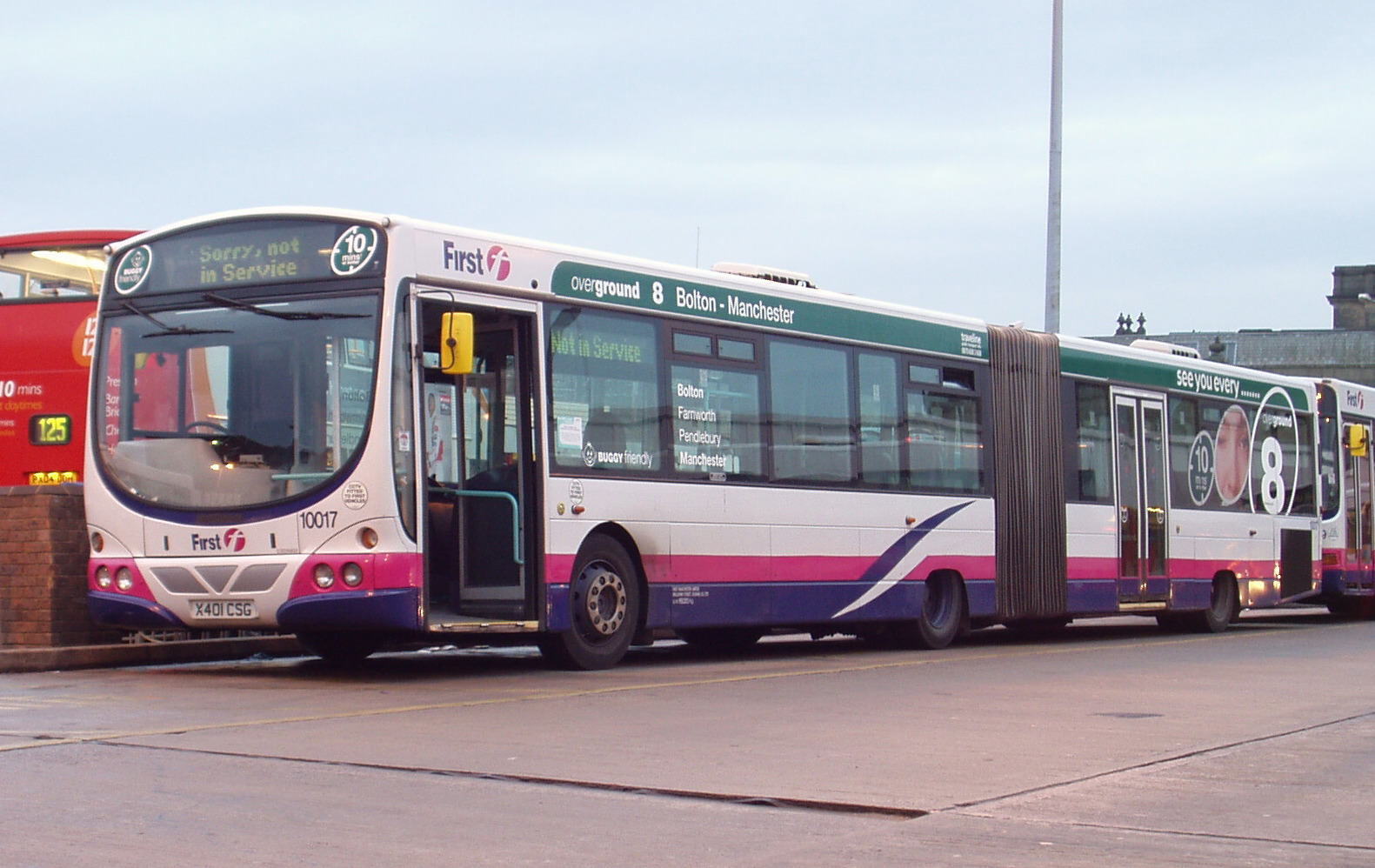
Scania L94UA with First Greater Manchester

Towards the new millennium, interest was revived in the more advanced, lighter, low-floor designs being introduced, and the first second-generation articulated buses were introduced by First Greater Manchester in 1998/1999 on route 135. Articulated buses were first introduced in London in the early 2000s. Later, FirstGroup, in collaboration with Volvo and Wrightbus, developed the Wright StreetCar. FirstGroup branded this the FTR concept, for use in the introduction of new bus rapid transit schemes. The FTR was used in York, Leeds and Swansea.

Use of conventional articulated buses has extended beyond London, into the other English regions, as well as Scotland and Wales. Cardiff Bus secured the first Statutory Quality Bus Partnership in the UK which prompted the introduction of high technology artics. While Arriva London had the largest single fleet, in London, First operated the most artics in the UK, across its subsidiary companies. Many articulated buses in operation across the United Kingdom are exiles from London.

=== Use in London ===
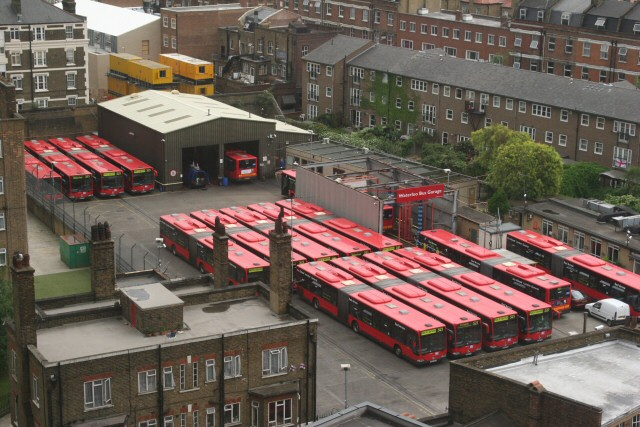
The Red Arrow articulated bus fleet at Waterloo bus garage

The majority of UK articulated buses were based in London, driven by the tendering specification system of Transport for London, the regulation authority responsible for bus services in London. The unfamiliarity of articulated buses in London caused several issues, including safety and fare evasion; the Citaros suffered a series of well-publicised fires, and the overhang of the rear section often moved differently to their single-bodied equivalents, earning the ire of cyclists in particular.

By 2008, the London fleet stood at 393 buses. In August 2008, following the election of Boris Johnson as Mayor of London, it was announced the articulated buses would be withdrawn as their five-year operating contracts came to an end, starting from May 2009. Route 207 was the last route to operate articulated buses on 10 December 2011.

With the main London operators of articulated buses (Arriva and the Go-Ahead Group) also having significant provincial fleets in the UK, many were cascaded to regional fleets. Arriva exported 68 to the narrow roads of Malta in 2011 for use by its Arriva in Malta subsidiary.

=== Use in Cardiff ===
Articulated Scania Omnicity buses with Cardiff Bus

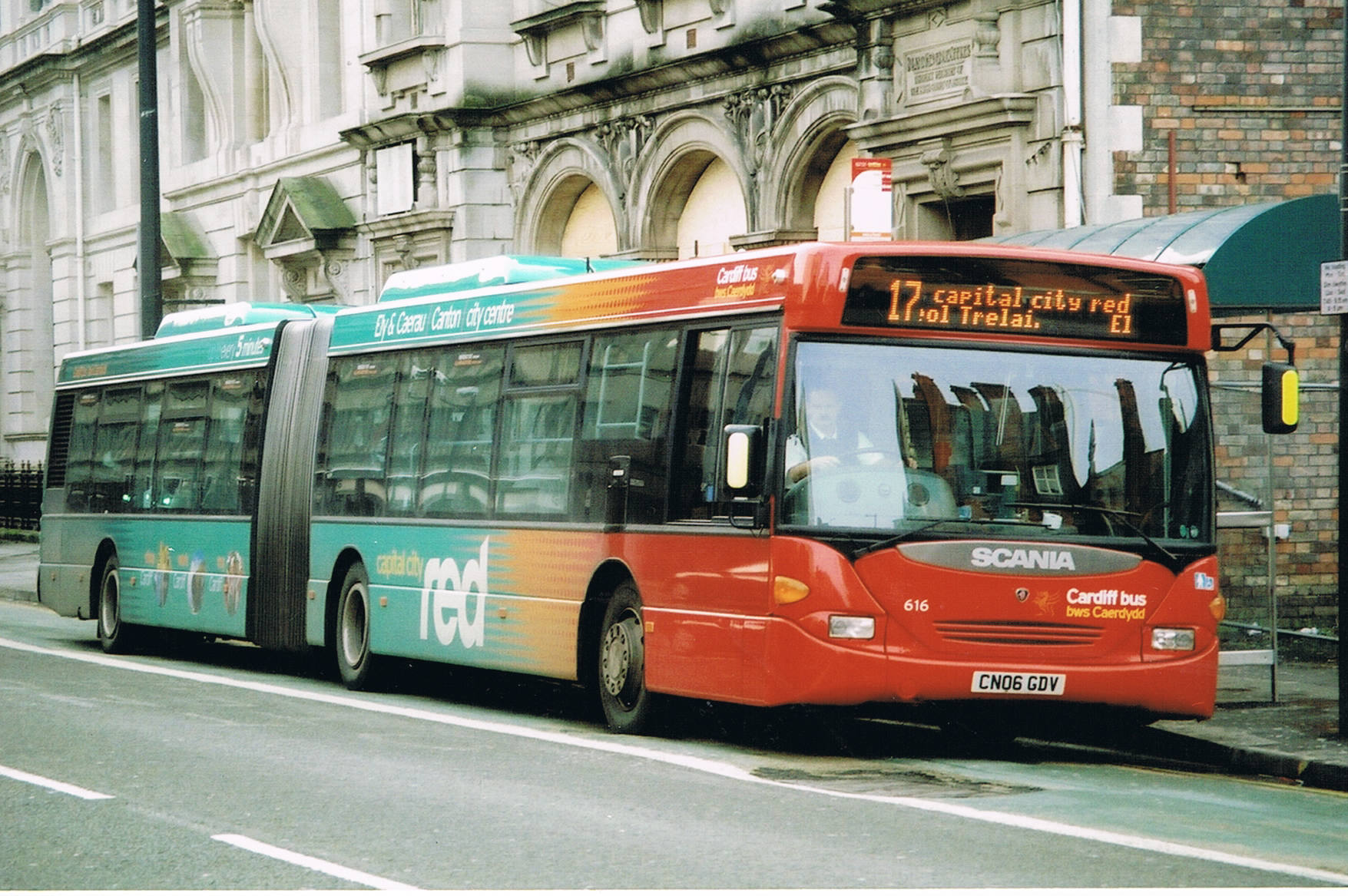
Capital City Red liveried articulated bus

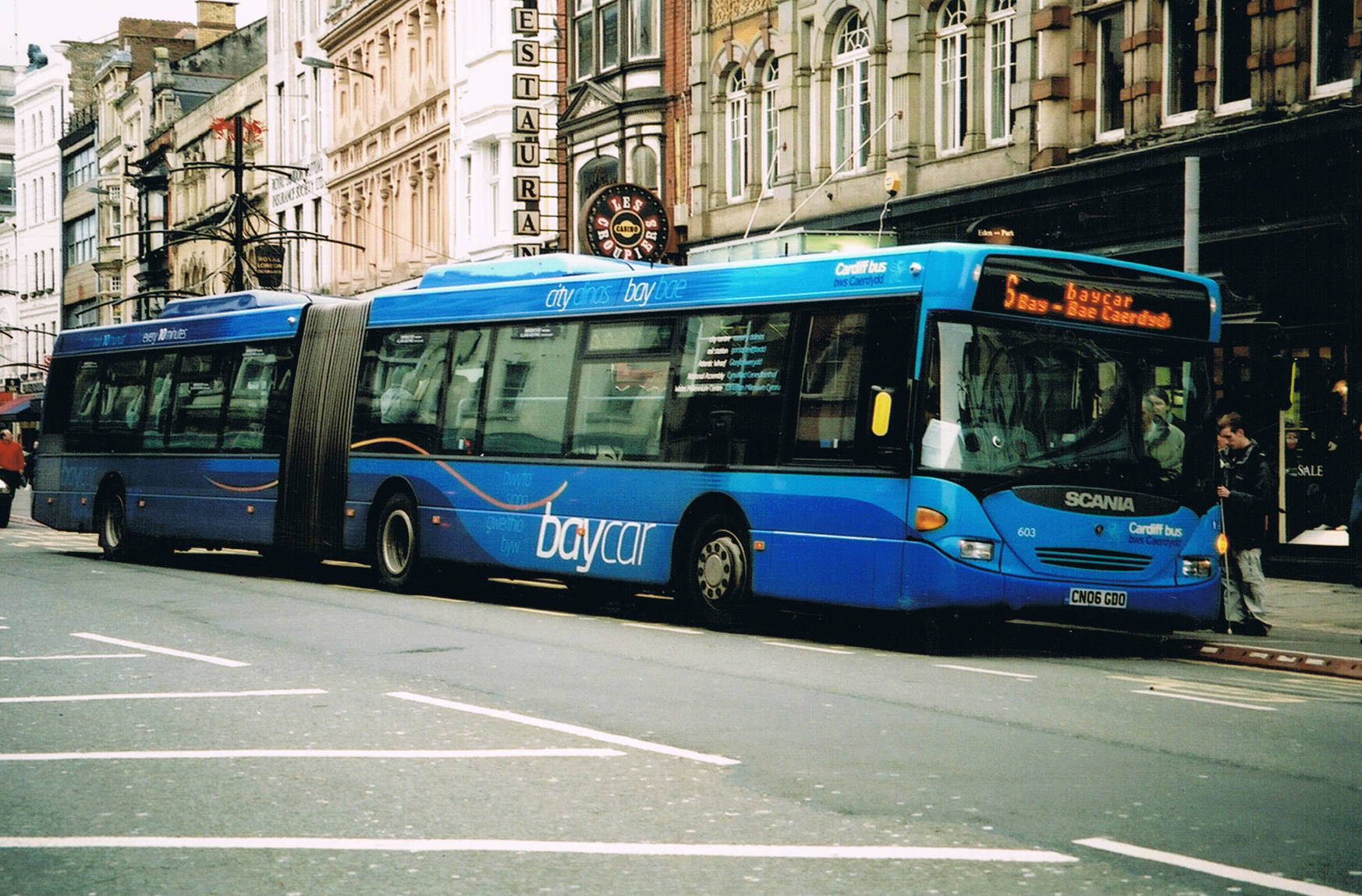
Baycar liveried articulated bus

In 2006, Cardiff Bus took delivery of 19 articulated Scania OmniCitys. Twelve of these were delivered for use on the Capital City Red services to Ely, which operated to a five-minute frequency, to improve infrastructure and increase capacity on a route previously operated by conventional single deckers, with the aim being that the Ely corridor would become the first Statutory Quality Bus Partnership in Wales. Four OmniCities were allocated to the Baycar service between Cardiff city centre and Cardiff Bay, operating to a ten-minute frequency with the buses delivered in a blue livery. These buses were given a mid-life refurbishment in 2013.

Withdrawal and disposal of the articulated OmniCities began in 2020, with four put into storage and two sold to other operators. The Baycar OmniCities were later withdrawn from the service, being reallocated to conventional city routes following a repaint into standard Cardiff Bus livery. The remaining OmniCities were withdrawn on 29 January 2022 following the arrival of 36 Yutong E12 battery electric buses, with many being sold to other operators or entering private preservation.

=== Use in the West Midlands ===
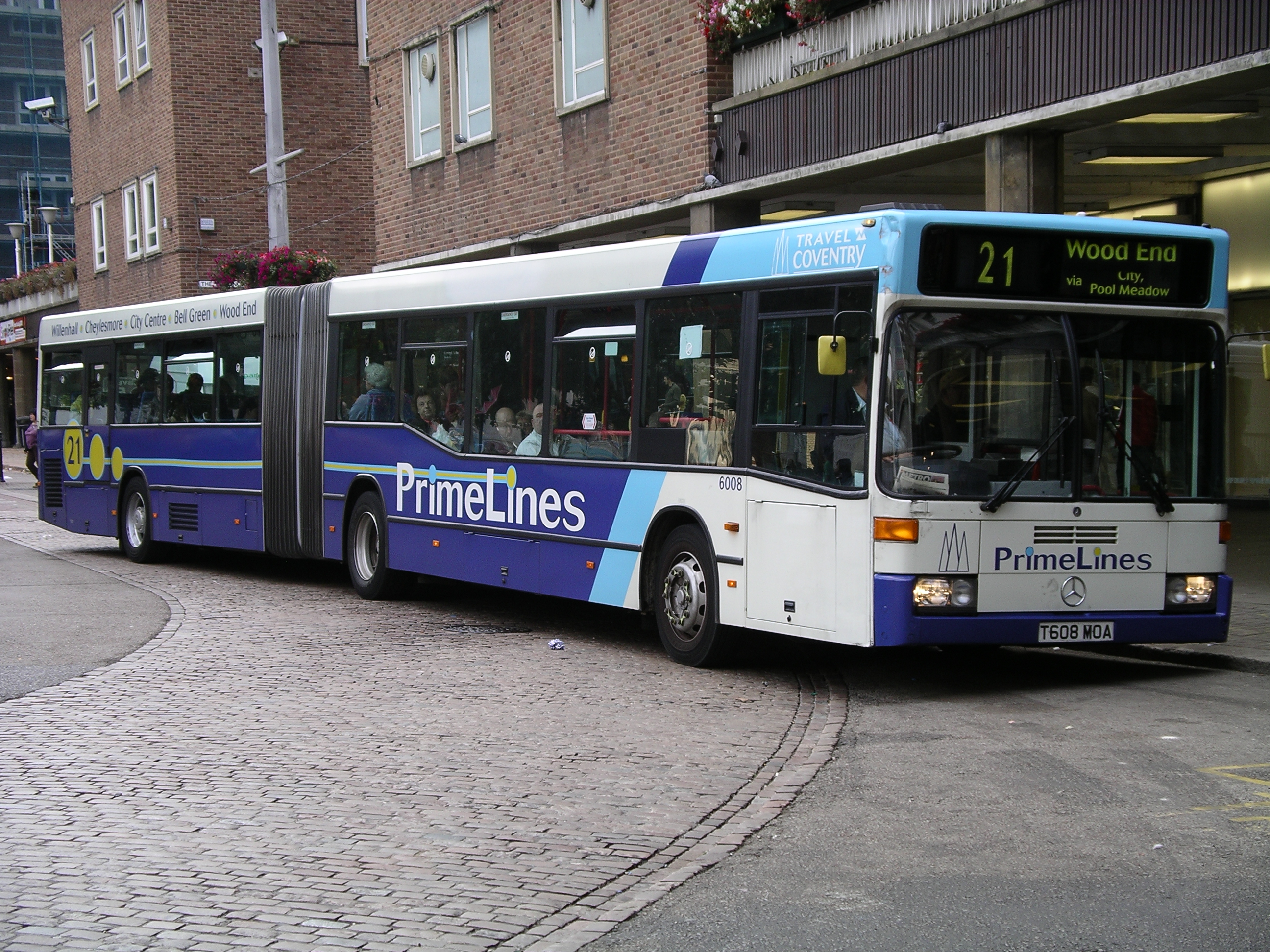
National Express Coventry Mercedes-Benz O405GN articulated bus in Coventry

In early 2000 Travel West Midlands (TWM) took delivery of 11 Mercedes-Benz O405 articulated buses for its route 67 between Castle Vale and Birmingham. In late 2003 Travel Coventry bought 10 articulated Mercedes-Benz Citaro vehicles for Primeline routes in Coventry; the earlier O405s joined the Citaros in Coventry, although one was scrapped after a depot fire. To replace the previous articulated vehicles on route 67 NXWM purchased eleven Scania OmniCitys branded for the route. The O405 vehicles were withdrawn from service in late 2011, and the last of the Citaros were withdrawn in March 2018.

=== Other operators ===
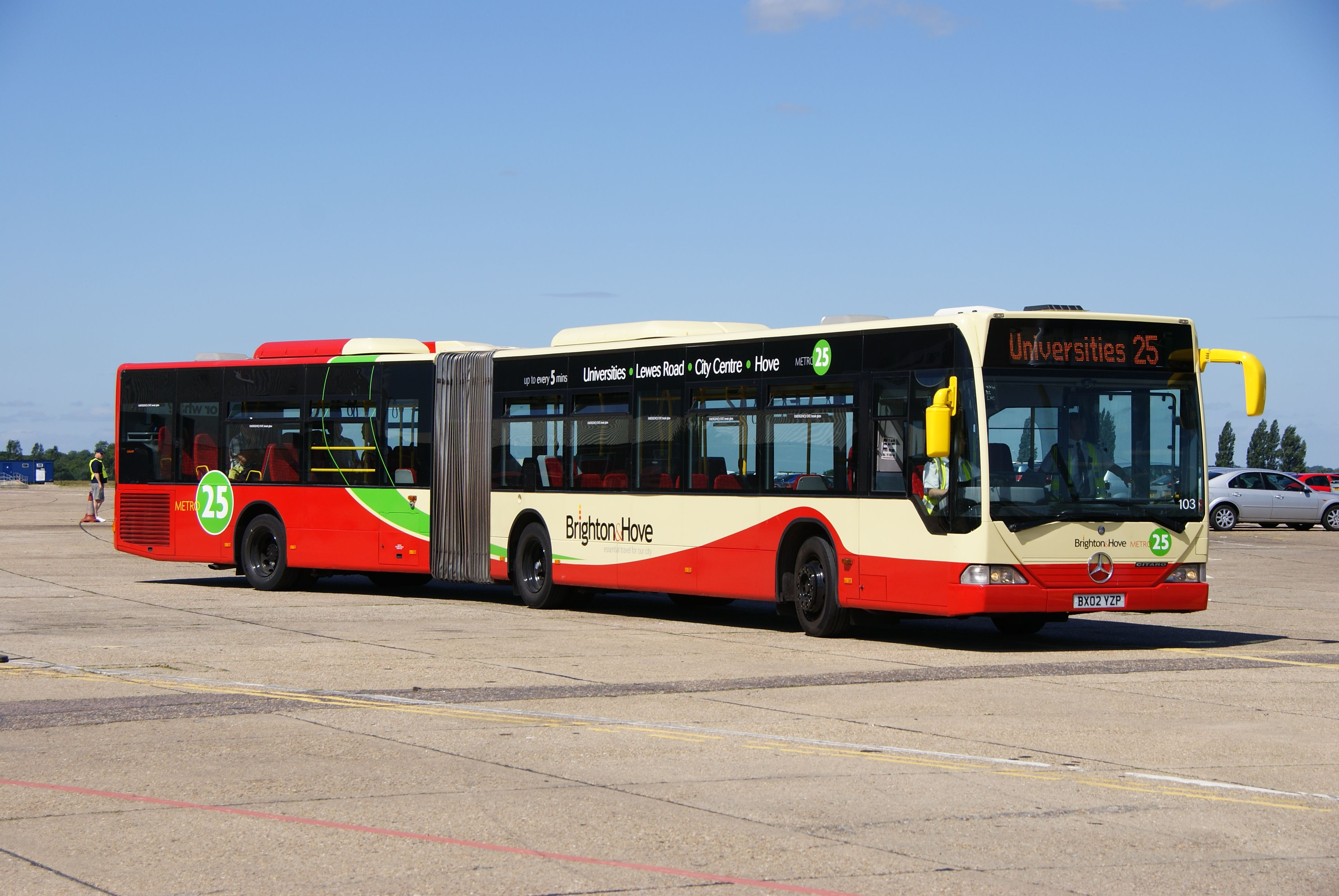
A Brighton & Hove articulated Mercedes-Benz Citaro at a bus rally in 2010

Articulated buses are common at airports around the United Kingdom, and are usually operated on shuttle services between terminals and car parks. Bristol Airport is a significant operator of articulated Mercedes-Benz Citaros, taking delivery of their first in 2007 and being the first UK operator to order the Euro VI Citaro in 2014. In 2020, 21 new articulated Citaros also entered service at London Stansted Airport.

A small fleet of Volvo B7LA Wright Eclipse Fusions and a single Volvo B10LA Wright Fusion were introduced to Southampton by First Hampshire and Dorset at the start of the millennium. These buses mainly operated routes 17 and 17A, running from the city centre to the suburbs of Millbrook, Maybush, Shirley, Weston and Woolston. Potholes, speed bumps and raised centre islands on roundabouts helped to shorten their service life.

Articulated buses were first introduced to York in 2003 with the arrival of six Volvo B7LA Wright Eclipse Fusions acquired from First Bradford for use on the York Park and Ride. As well as receiving a fleet of Wright StreetCars for use on the city's FTR network, which were withdrawn in 2012 after the City of York Council refused to renew an agreement with First to run the service, First York took delivery of 15 articulated Mercedes-Benz Citaros branded in a silver livery for the Park & Ride network in 2009. Most of these were withdrawn in 2020 with the arrival of new Optare MetroDecker EVs for the network, however six were retained and upgraded to Euro VI standard for the Rawcliffe Bar route.

Following a successful trial period in 2009, Brighton & Hove first purchased four articulated Citaros from Go-Ahead London in 2010, which were refurbished and put into service for use on routes 25 and 25X serving the University of Brighton. An additional 14 Citaros were later acquired in 2012 to increase capacity on the service. All of Brighton & Hove's 22 Citaros were withdrawn by October 2022 and replaced with former London double-deckers, with the company claiming that discontinued spare parts for the buses, fuel emissions concerns and falling passenger numbers on the university services had led to their withdrawal. One of the withdrawn Citaros were later operated on a special farewell service on the 25 on 7 November, marking the end of 12 years of operating articulated buses in Brighton.

Articulated buses have also been used on smaller university bus networks across the United Kingdom. Uno of Hatfield operated five second-hand Citaros on its shuttle service to the University of Hertfordshire from 2012 until 2019, shortly after one of the buses was destroyed by fire, while Wilts & Dorset also took on a pair of former London Citaros for shuttle services to Bournemouth University. Arriva Leicester also introduced a fleet of articulated buses on route 80 serving Oadby and the adjacent University of Leicester following trials on the route in 2010.

Translink's Glider bus rapid transit system in Belfast is operated using a fleet of 30 18m-long Van Hool ExquiCity 18 articulated buses. These were delivered in 2017, although they entered passenger service with the launch of the Glider system in September 2018 after a series of delays.

During 2025, Tyne and Wear independent operator City Transport commenced operating the council supported 'Sunderland Connect' 700 service with a fleet of two articulated Mercedes-Benz Citaros acquired from First York, running between Park Lane Interchange and the University of Sunderland's St Peter's campus. Prior to the commencement of operators, for a week in May 2025, City Transport revived the use of articulated buses in Sheffield by operating three Citaros on tram replacement services between Sheffield city centre and both the Malin Bridge and Middlewood tram stops during Sheffield Supertram engineering works.

=== Types ===
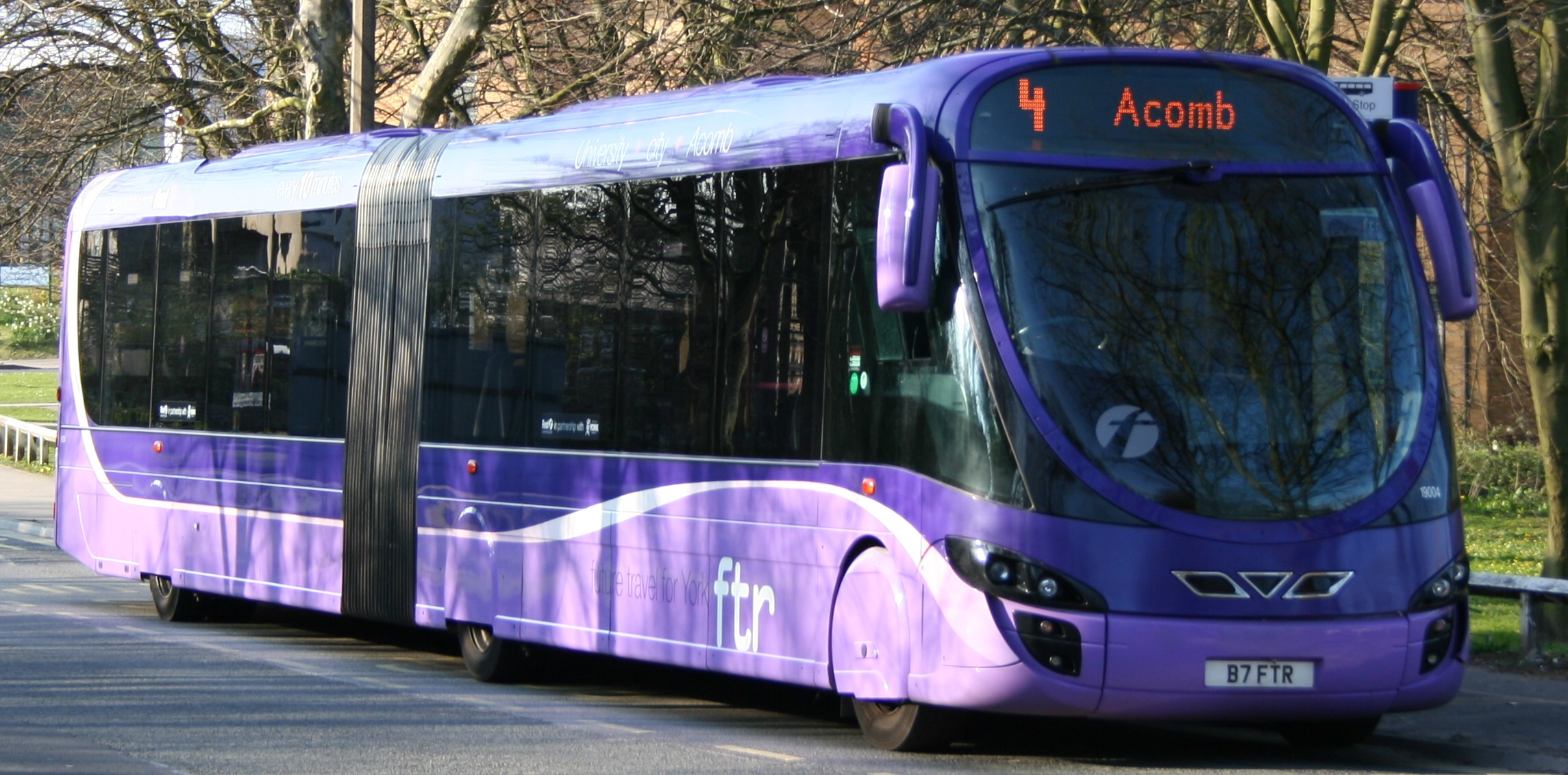
A Wright StreetCar articulated bus

The majority of articulated buses in the UK are Mercedes-Benz Citaros, with the remainder being standard Scania and Volvos, and the Wright StreetCar.

The types in use are:

- Mercedes-Benz Citaro integral buses
- Mercedes-Benz O405GN integral buses
- Scania OmniCity integral buses
- Scania L94UA chassis with Wright Solar Fusion bodywork
- Volvo B10LA chassis with Wright Fusion bodywork
- Volvo B7LA chassis with Wright Eclipse Fusion bodywork
- Wright StreetCar, a Volvo/Wright combined project
