= Roath Lock =

Television production studio in Cardiff, Wales

BBC Roath Lock Studios
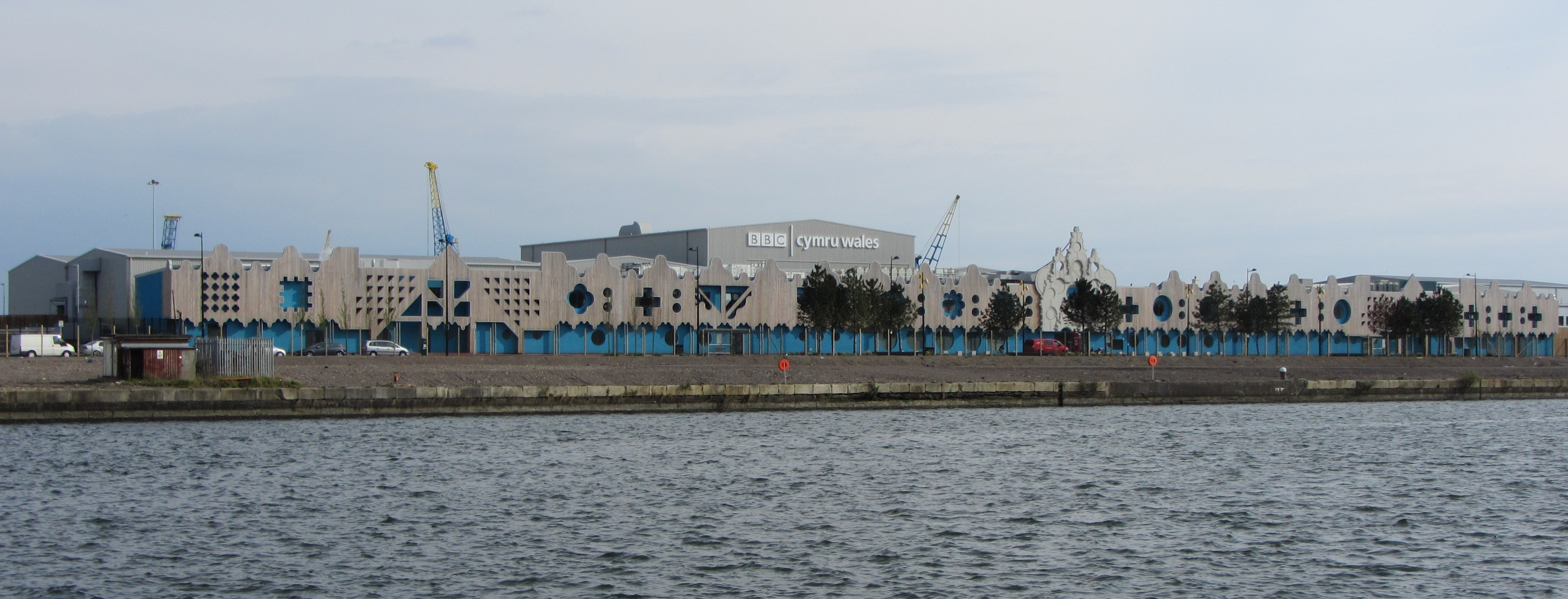
- Interactive map of the BBC Roath Lock Studios area

General information
- Location: Porth Teigr Way, Cardiff Bay, CF10 4GA, Cardiff, Wales, United Kingdom
- Coordinates: 51.4627°N 3.1565°W
- Opened: September 2011
- Owner: BBC Cymru Wales

BBC Roath Lock Studios is a television production studio in Cardiff, Wales. The facility houses BBC Studios drama productions that include (as of 2026) Casualty and Pobol y Cwm. The centre topped out on 20 February 2011 and filming for such productions commenced in autumn of the same year.

The facility is located on a development site known as Porth Teigr, which included a proposed 3,700-square-metre (40,000 ft^{2}) digital media centre, and between 2012 and 2017 hosted an interactive Doctor Who exhibition titled the Doctor Who Experience. The facility was built to accommodate 500 to 600 people working on site.

== Design ==
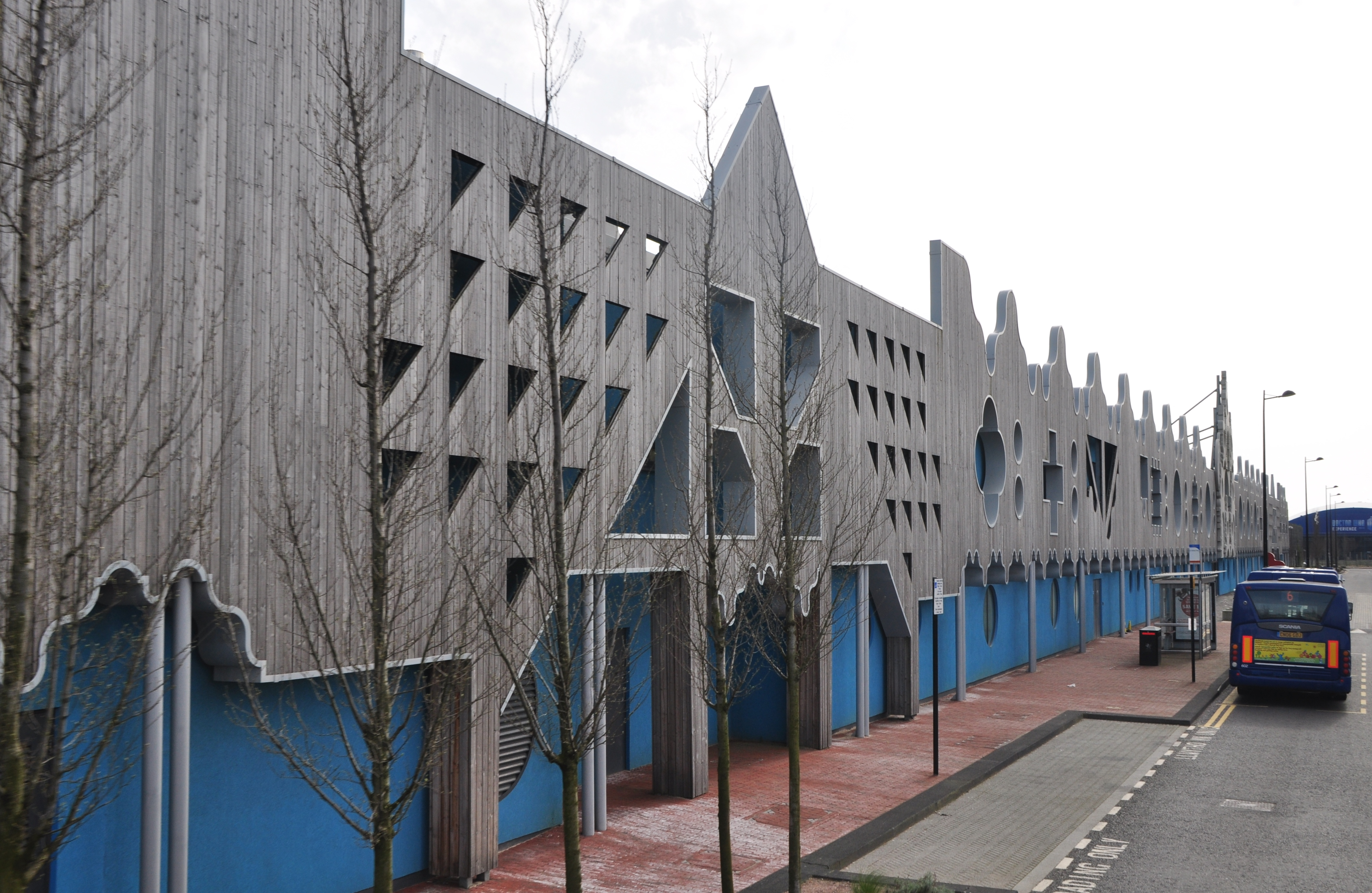
Facade detail (March 2014)

The successful planning application sought permission for a 300-metre (980 ft) long, 20,000-square-metre (220,000 sq ft) building housing studios and offices with a distinctive façade and repeating motifs. It will also have a gothic-style entrance inspired by some of William Burges' designs at Cardiff Castle and Castell Coch. The planning application showed the building would face the National Assembly's Tŷ Hywel building and the Atradius building across the water of Roath Basin.

FAT architecture were appointed as architects and designed a bold façade in homage to the Cardiff architecture of William Burges and the local South Wales landscape. Unusual requirements for the building included an exact replica, in design and orientation, of the Bristol studio's Holby City carpark and corridors wide enough for two Daleks to pass one another.

== Construction ==
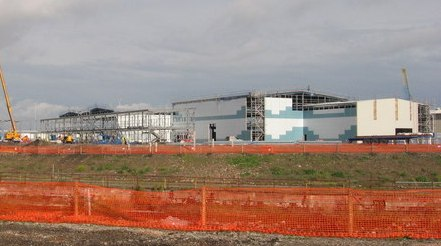
Roath Lock during construction

The 16,300 square metres (175,000 ft^{2}) of studios were constructed and fitted out within 13 months, marking the quickest BBC build of its size ever. The name of the drama village, Roath Lock, was announced at the topping out ceremony in January 2011.

A £2.5m bridge linking the drama village to Cardiff Bay was lifted into place. The bridge was manufactured in nearby Newport from where it was broken down into twelve pieces to allow transportation. The building branding was manufactured in Cardiff by a local company which also designed and implement the wayfinding signs which was helped for a prestigious branding company

== Production ==
The development has brought under one roof the production of shows formerly filmed in Cardiff's Broadcasting House, at Upper Boat Studios near Pontypridd, and in Bristol.

Programmes confirmed to be filmed and produced at the studios include:

- Doctor Who (until 2022)
- Class
- An Adventure in Space and Time
- Casualty
- Pobol y Cwm (for S4C)
- Upstairs Downstairs
- Wizards vs Aliens
- A Midsummer Night's Dream
- A 2014 adaption of Under Milk Wood starring Michael Sheen, Tom Jones, Matthew Rhys, Aimee-Ffion Edwards, Iwan Rheon, Ioan Gruffudd, Griff Rhys Jones, John Rhys-Davies, and many more famous predominantly Welsh faces.

Other productions produced by Roath Lock, but not necessarily filmed at the studios include: Merlin, Atlantis, Being Human, The Living and the Dead, Sherlock, War & Peace, The Game, The Passing Bells, The Green Hollow, A Poet in New York, and To Walk Invisible.

After the studios, offices and external filming lots were fully fitted out, filming for Pobol y Cwm and Casualty began in autumn 2011. Doctor Who moved into the 170,000 sq ft (15,800 sq m) site in 2012. The Sarah Jane Adventures was also scheduled to move to the facility in 2012, but future production of the series was cancelled in April 2011 due to the death of lead actress Elisabeth Sladen. The village is part of the BBC's commitment to double television network production from Cardiff by 2016.

== Surrounding development ==
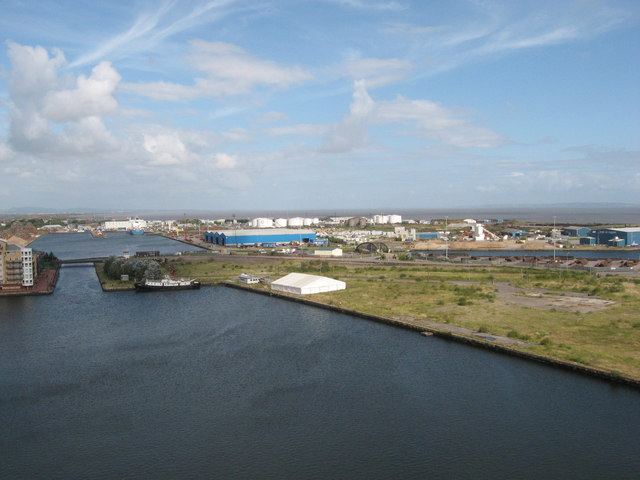
Roath Basin (nearest), Roath Dock (above) with the channel to Queen Alexandra Dock (centre right).

Roath Basin is the largest single remaining undeveloped site in Cardiff Bay. It consists of approximately 27 acres and has an outline planning permission for 1,000 new homes and 100,000 sq m of commercial floor space. Igloo Regeneration, which is an investment fund managed by Aviva Investments, was selected by the Assembly Government as the Development Partner for the project.

Investment of £8.5 million is needed to provide a road connection through the site providing both private and public transport from Pierhead Street through to the Norwegian Church, where a new bridge will need to be constructed over the existing lock-entrance to the dock.

The project comprises two distinct, but inter-dependent, components; the regeneration of the currently derelict, former dock side land at Roath Basin would be commenced by Assembly Government investment into the site infrastructure, and the BBC Drama Village, which would total some 170,000 sq ft (16,000 m^{2}) of television studios and ancillary accommodation, as well as a new office building, which could be operated as a "Digital Media Centre" where a range of BBC supply-chain companies and existing Welsh-based Creative Industry Sector businesses would be able to be accommodated.

== Transport links ==
The Roath Lock Drama Village was served by the Baycar (Cardiff Bus number 6) service operated by Cardiff Bus, that ran every 10 minutes to Cardiff Bay and the City Centre.

== See also ==
- New Broadcasting House, Cardiff
- BBC Wales
- Media in Cardiff
