= Porth Teigr =

Area in Cardiff, Wales

Coordinates: 51.461561°N 3.157959°W

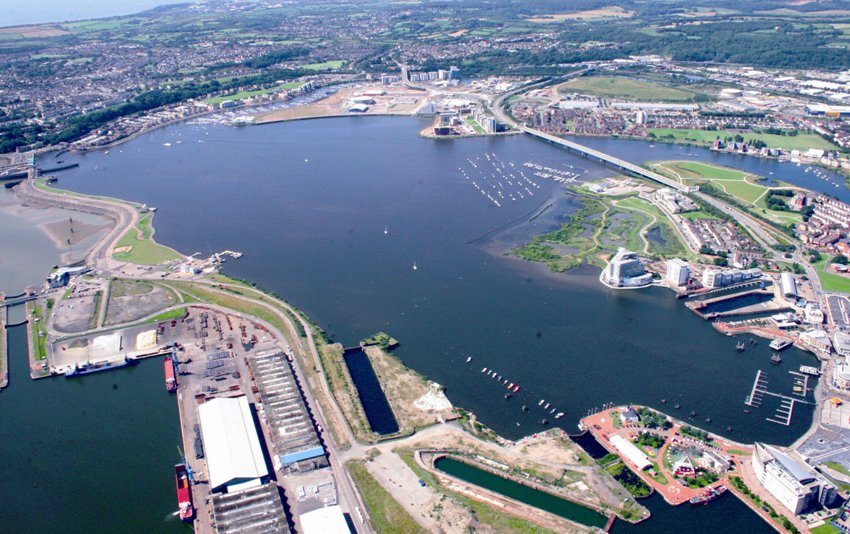
Cardiff Bay (2008) with part of the Porth Teigr brownfield site in the foreground

Porth Teigr (meaning: "Tiger Gate") is an area under development in the docks area of Cardiff Bay, in the south of Cardiff, Wales. Its development began in 2008.

The multi-use area will host the BBC drama village, with plans to link this to a new digital centre. The work will cover a large brownfield area.

== Background ==
The venture was formed in 2005 between urban regeneration firm igloo and the Welsh Government. The venture is responsible for developing 38 acres of land on the south side of Roath Basin in Cardiff Bay as an environmentally sustainable mixed use development including commercial, retail and residential space. The developer advertises Porth Teigr as one of the most significant waterfront developments in the UK and will transform the last major derelict site in the inner harbour area to create more than 1 million sq. ft. of commercial development space and over 1,000 new homes. The development was granted permission to go ahead in 2008, to become the centre point for creative industries in Wales. It was officially named Porth Teigr in November 2010, in homage to the famous Cardiff docklands area of Tiger Bay.

== Developments ==
It is anticipated that the redeveloped site will ultimately provide opportunities for some 4,000 jobs. The redevelopment was anticipated to include some 200,000 sq.ft of leisure and retail space as well as a range of housing, including affordable units claimed to be amongst the first in the UK designed to give flexibility of spaces to enable adaptation for lifestyle changes. Two dry docks will be flooded to help give the site more than 1.6 miles of waterfront, much with views across Cardiff Bay.

=== BBC production studios ===
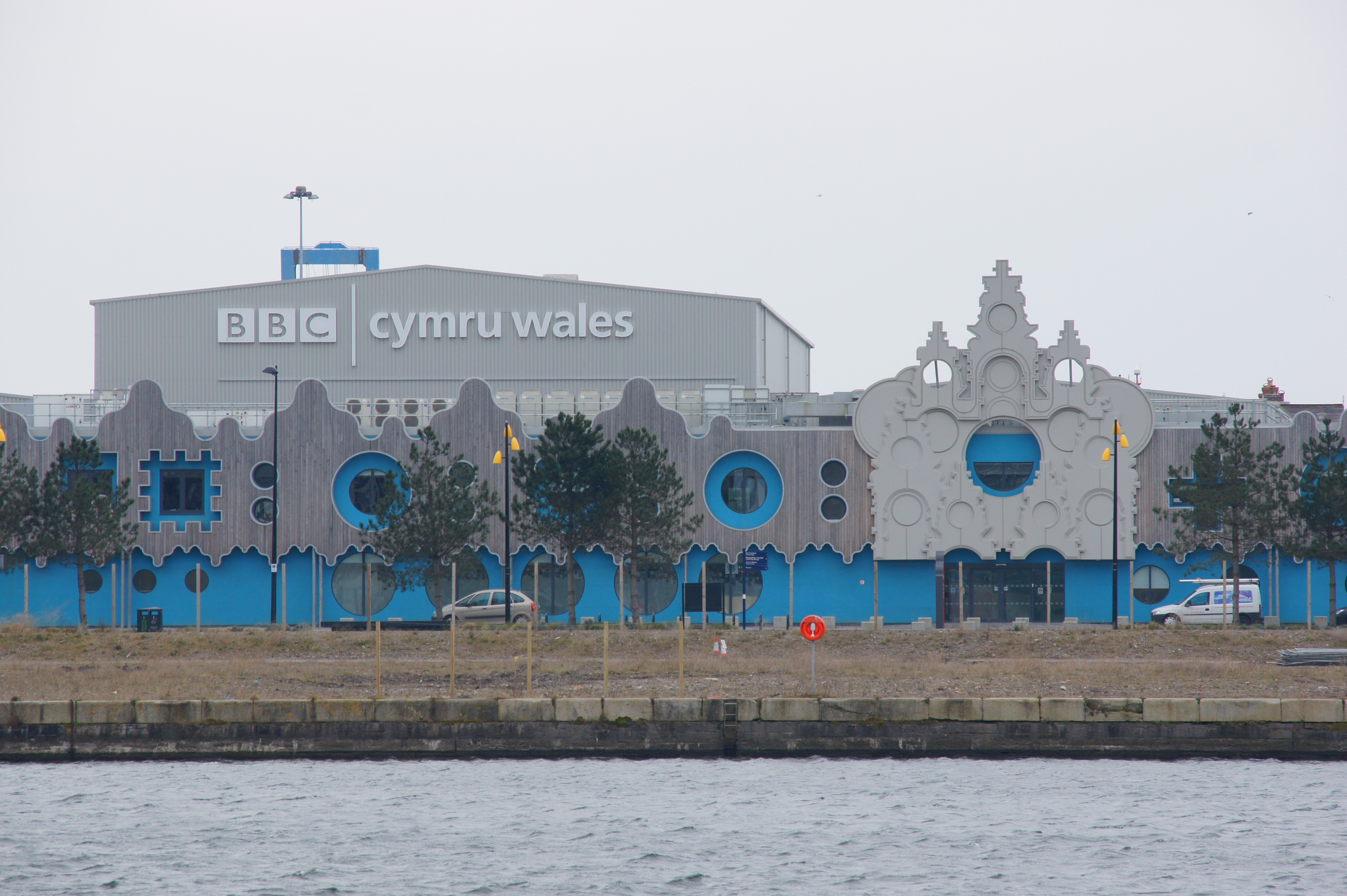
BBC Roath Lock studios

The centrepiece of the development is the new 170,000 sq foot drama production studio complex for the BBC at Roath Lock. Extensive infrastructure and public realm works including a new bridge linking the site to the remainder of the inner harbour were completed enabling access to the new BBC Roath Lock Studios. The studios were officially opened on 12 March 2012 and will be the home to several productions, including Doctor Who (until 2021), Casualty, Pobol y Cwm and Upstairs Downstairs. Casualty started filming on site in September 2011.

=== Digital Media Centre ===
Plans were approved for the new Digital Media Centre (DMC) at Porth Teigr in April 2011, with a design reflecting the dock area's history using brick and timber. It was due to commence on site in November 2011 and be ready for occupation towards the end of 2012. The 40,000 sq ft building was to provide opportunities for small, high growth businesses and freelancers. The Digital Media Centre aimed to support the Creative Industries sector in Wales with the capacity to accommodate 400 people.

=== Doctor Who Centre ===
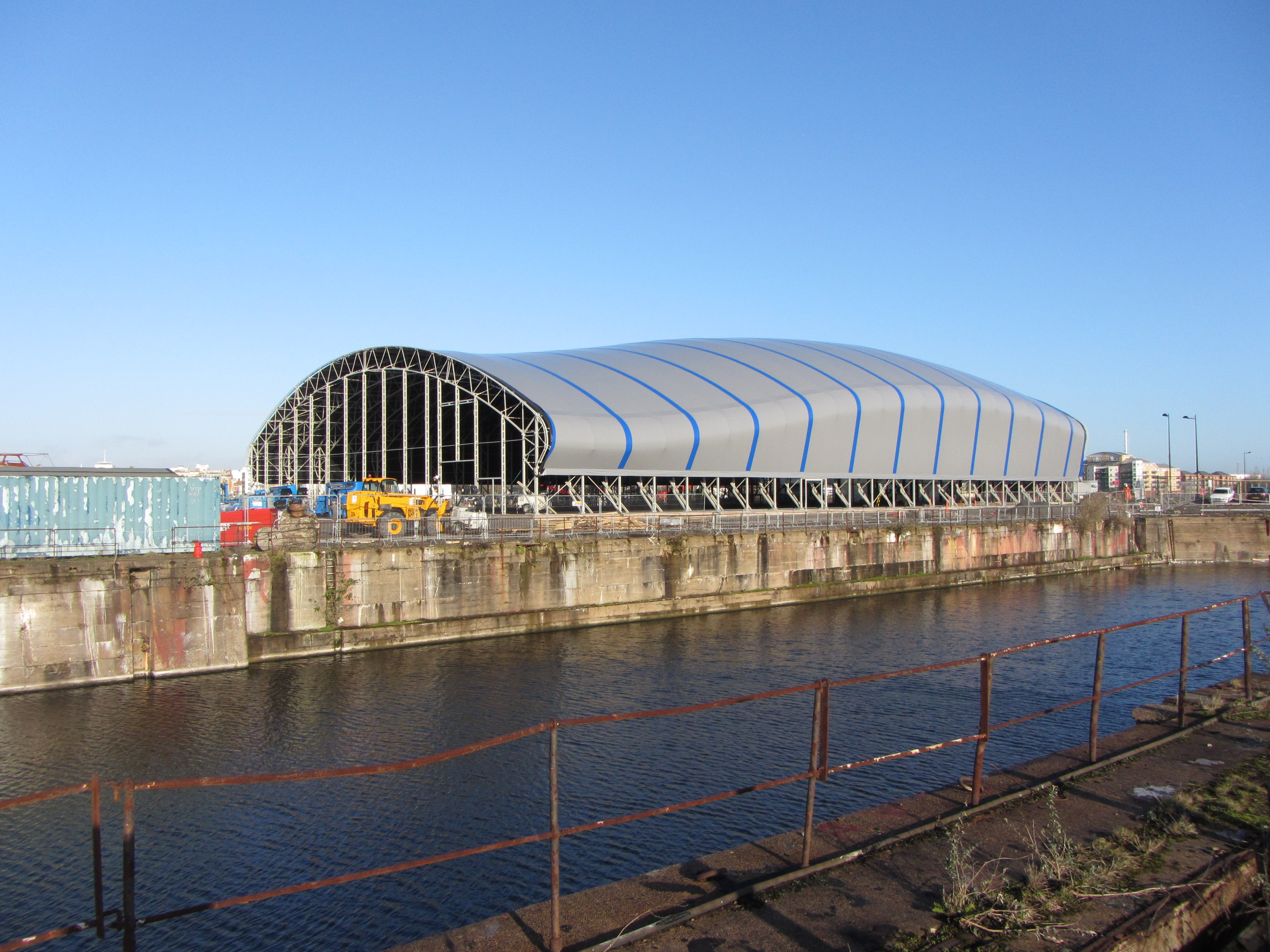
Doctor Who Experience during construction

A 3000 sq metre building was constructed in Porth Teigr as the long-term home of the Doctor Who Experience when it relocated from London's Olympia to Cardiff in 2012. BBC Worldwide had announced in September 2010 that it intended to relocate the attraction in Cardiff during 2012, the city of its filming and production, following consolidation of its previous Doctor Who exhibitions, including the closure of the former Doctor Who Exhibition in Cardiff's Red Dragon Centre in March 2011. The Doctor Who Experience closed in September 2017 after its 5-year lease had expired.

=== Housing ===
The developers intended Porth Teigr to be a mixed development, hoping to avoid creating an area that was desolate at certain times of day. In 2014 igloo employed local residential architect Chris Loyn, initially to work on a residential development of 120 owner-occupier homes. Outline planning consent had been granted for up to 1,100 homes.
