= Maindy =

District of Cardiff, Wales

Coordinates: 51.500°N 3.200°W

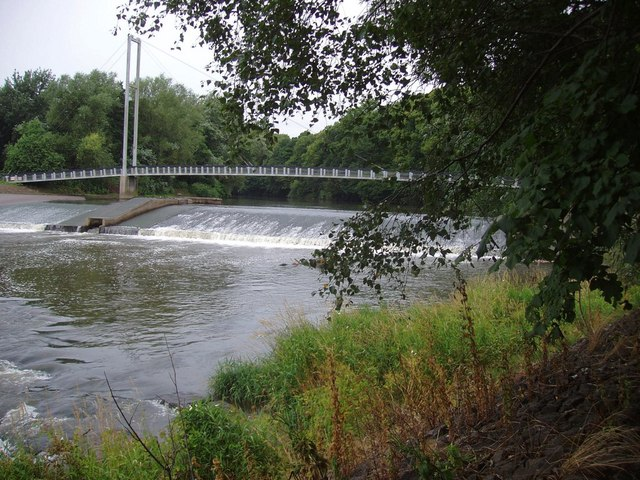
Footbridge-and-weir combination in the lower River Taff in the Maindy area of Cardiff.

Maindy (Welsh: Maendy, meaning 'stone house') is a district of the city of Cardiff, Wales. Its boundaries are not formally recognised by Cardiff Council, and the district falls within the Cathays ward and Gabalfa.

A notable facility in the area is the Maindy Centre consisting of a cycle track and swimming pool. The cycle track was used in the 1958 British Empire and Commonwealth Games.

The area is served by the Capital City Green bus route.
