= Cathays (electoral ward) =

Coordinates: 51.49499°N 3.18115°W

Cathays ward
- Electoral ward
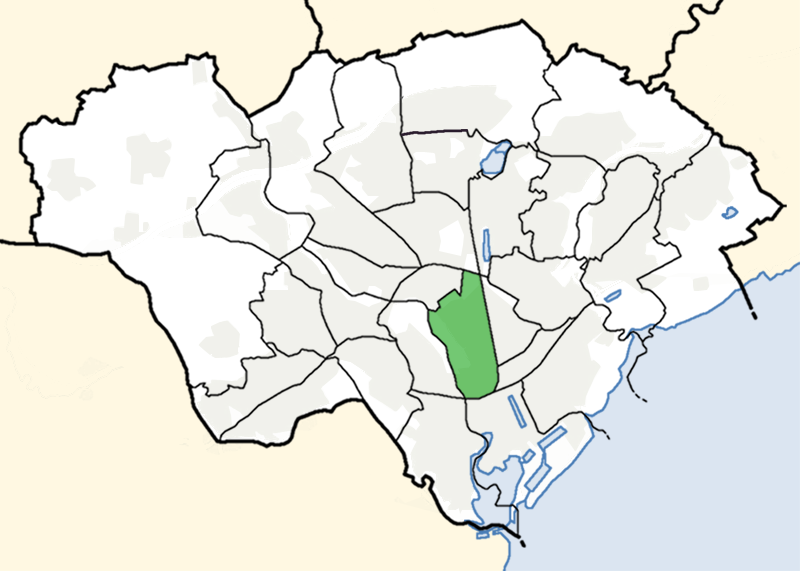
- Location of the Cathays ward within Cardiff
- Population: 20,021 (2011 census)
- OS grid reference: ST181780
- Principal area: Cardiff
- Country: Wales
- Sovereign state: United Kingdom
- Post town: CARDIFF
- Postcode district: CF24
- Dialling code: +44-29
- UK Parliament: Cardiff South and Penarth
- Senedd Cymru – Welsh Parliament: Cardiff Central
- Councillors: 4

The Cathays (/kəˈteɪz/ kə-TAYZ) electoral ward of Cardiff, created in 1890, which since 1974 has covered the Cathays and Castle communities. There is no community council for the area and it has elected four councillors since 1999.

== Description ==
The Cathays ward includes some or all of the following areas: Blackweir, Cardiff city centre, Cathays Park and Maindy in the UK Parliament constituency of Cardiff South and Penarth and Senedd constituency of Cardiff Central. It is bounded by Gabalfa and Birchgrove to the north; Plasnewydd and Adamsdown to the east; Butetown to the south; and Riverside to the west. The River Taff forms its western boundary to where it meets the South Wales Main Line, the South Wales Main Line forms the southern boundary to where it meets the Valley Lines northbound branch, this railway line then forms the eastern boundary as far as the A48 road. The Northern boundary follows the A48 as far as Allensbank Road where it follows this road south then turns north again along Whitchurch Road. It turns west along Crown Way, then south along the A470 until North Road where it bears west, passing just south of the student halls, until it meets the River Taff. The tallest building in Wales is here and is also part of the Cardiff's CBD.

The ward contains a large number of Cardiff's landmarks including:

- Cardiff Cathedral
- Cathays Park with a number of civic buildings and public gardens
- Maindy Stadium
- Cathays Cemetery

The ward has traditionally had one of the highest percentages of student residents. In 2011 70% of adults in the ward (between 16 and 74) were students.

== Local elections ==
=== 1995–date ===
In 1995 the Cathays ward elected three councillors and, since 1999 four councillors to the Cardiff Council unitary authority.

At the May 2017 elections all four seats were won by the Labour Party.

=== 1974–1996 ===
Between 1974 and 1996 the Cathays ward was represented on Cardiff City Council by three councillors. These included Mike German, leader of the Liberal Democrats on the council; and Derek Allinson, Lord Mayor in 1992.

The ward was represented mainly by the Labour Party, until 1983 when the Liberal Democrats, Mike German and Fred Hornblow, won two of the seats. Between 1983 and 1996 the ward was represented by councillors German, Hornblow and Allinson.

1983 Cardiff City Council election
Party	Candidate	Votes	%	±%
Alliance	Michael J. German	1,742		
Alliance	Fred J. Hornblow	1,639		
Labour	Derek R. Allinson	1,531		
Alliance	D. W. T. Rees	1,524		
Labour	M. F. Harris	1,496		
Labour	W. C. Laing	1,335		
Conservative	F. Moorcraft	961		
Conservative	S. Phillips	909		
Conservative	E. Robinson	861		
Plaid Cymru	Owen John Thomas	261		
Ecology	K. J. Pearson	225		
Turnout				
Alliance gain from Labour		Swing		
Alliance gain from Labour		Swing		
Labour hold		Swing		

=== 1890–1974 ===
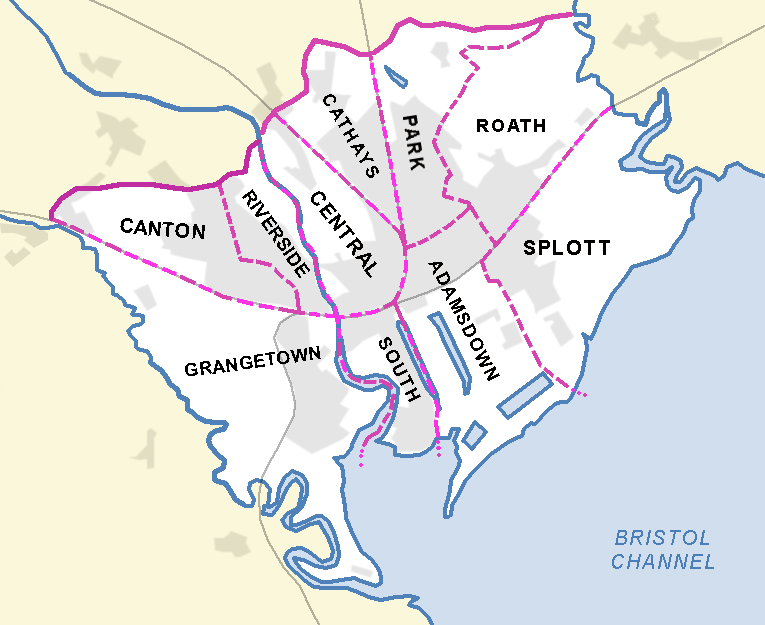
Wards of Cardiff, 1890

In July 1890, following the creation of Cardiff County Borough Council, Cathays was the name of one of the ten new electoral wards created in the county borough. It covered an area northeast of the Taff Vale Railway (with much of what is nowadays the Cathays ward, west of the railway, being part of the Central ward).

Each of the three councillors took turns to stand for re-election, on a three-yearly (later a nine-yearly) cycle.
