= Castle, Cardiff =

Community in Cardiff, Wales

Coordinates: 51°28′53″N 3°10′45″W

Castle
- Community
- Location within Cardiff
- Principal area: Cardiff
- Country: Wales
- Sovereign state: United Kingdom
- Police: South Wales
- Fire: South Wales
- Ambulance: Welsh
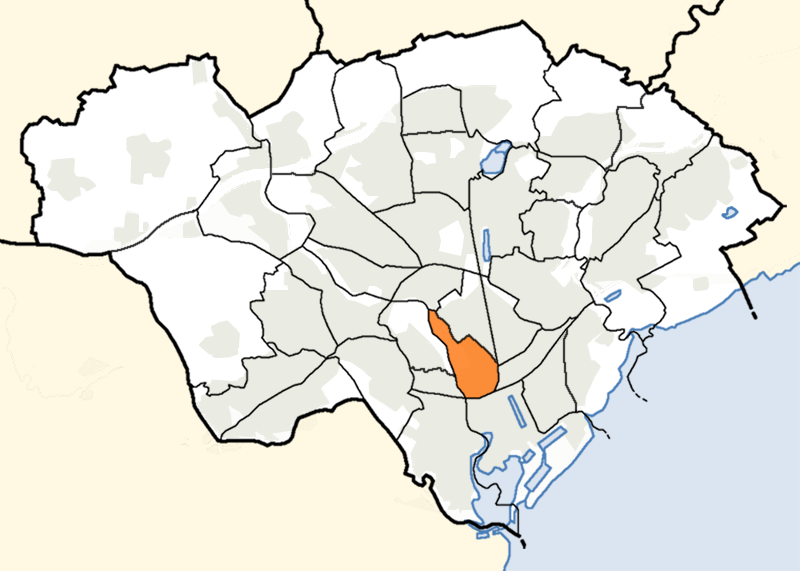
- List of places UK Wales Cardiff Map of the community

Castle (Welsh: Castell) is a community in the centre of Cardiff, Wales. It includes Cardiff city centre (and Cardiff Castle) as well as the civic buildings of Cathays Park, bordered by the River Taff to the west, the railway to the south and east, Corbett Road to the north.

There is no community council for the area. For elections to Cardiff City Council, Castle is part of the Cathays electoral ward.

There are 169 listed buildings and structures in the community, including seven at Grade I (mainly around Cathays Park and Cardiff Castle) and twelve at Grade II*.

The population in 2011 was 2,119, one of the smallest communities by population in Cardiff, and with fewer people identifying as Welsh than any other (23.2%).

== See also ==
- Listed buildings in Cardiff
