= Trolleybuses in Cardiff =

Former transport system in Wales

Cardiff trolleybus system
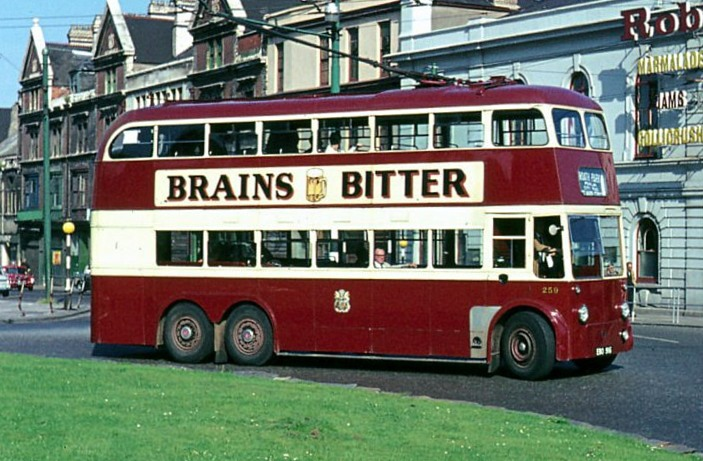
- Cardiff trolleybus in Custom House Street in 1966

Operation
- Locale: Cardiff, Wales
- Open: 1 March 1942
- Close: 11 January 1970
- Status: Closed
- Routes: 14
- Operator: Cardiff Corporation Transport

Infrastructure
- Stock: 79 (maximum)

The Cardiff trolleybus system once served Cardiff, the capital city of Wales. Opened on 1 March 1942, it gradually replaced the Cardiff tramway network.

Trolleybuses are electric buses that draw power from dual overhead wires using spring-loaded trolley poles. By the standards of the other now-defunct trolleybus systems in the United Kingdom, the Cardiff system was medium-sized, with 14 routes and a maximum fleet of 79 trolleybuses. It was closed on 11 January 1970.

Four Cardiff trolleybuses have been preserved. Nos. 243 and 262 are at the Cardiff & South Wales Trolleybus Project in eastern Cardiff, no. 215 is at the National Collections Centre of National Museum Wales, Nantgarw, and no. 203 is at the Trolleybus Museum at Sandtoft, Lincolnshire, England.

== See also ==
- Bus transport in Cardiff
- History of Cardiff
- Transport in Cardiff
- List of trolleybus systems in the United Kingdom
