= Cathays railway station =

Railway station in Cardiff, Wales

Cathays
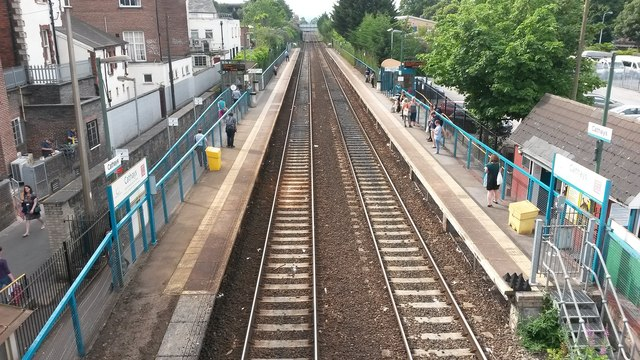

General information
- Location: Cathays, Cardiff; Wales
- Coordinates: 51°29′21″N 3°10′45″W
- Grid reference: ST182773
- Manager: Transport for Wales
- Platforms: 2

Other information
- Station code: CYS
- Classification: DfT category E

History
- Original company: British Rail

Key dates
- 3 October 1983: Opened

Passengers
- 2020/21: ▼0.136 million
- 2021/22: ▲0.515 million
- 2022/23: ▲0.699 million
- 2023/24: ▲0.823 million
- 2024/25: ▲0.934 million
Location
Notes
- Passenger statistics from the Office of Rail & Road

Cathays railway station is a station on the Merthyr and Rhondda lines in the Cathays district of Cardiff, Wales. It is 1 1/4 miles (2 km) north of Cardiff Central.

When Cathays opened in 1983 it reversed a trend to close stations. Funded by British Rail and South Glamorgan County Council, construction commenced in April 1983, with the station opened on 3 October 1983.

== Location ==
The station is next to Cardiff University Students' Union and across the road from many Cardiff University buildings, as well as a short walk from the Welsh Government and other civic buildings in Cathays Park. The footbridge over the railway is much used as a shortcut between Park Place and Senghenydd Road.

== Facilities ==
Cathays station is now staffed during peak hours, since the introduction of a new automated ticket barrier system in summer 2007. Cathays has two platforms, each with a small shelter and an information screen displaying the next train's arrival.

The station is the seventh-most used railway station in Wales but is inaccessible to wheelchair users who wish to cross between platforms as there are no bridges or lifts. Transport for Wales has future plans to install an accessible bridge as part of the South Wales Metro project. Enabling works is expected to begin in June 2026, with the new footbridge to be installed in the autumn.

== Services ==
In the daytime from Monday to Saturday, there are usually six trains an hour from Cardiff Central to Pontypridd, two of which terminate there, two of which continue to Treherbert and two of which continue to Merthyr Tydfil. Four eastbound trains per hour continue beyond Cardiff Queen Street to Cardiff Central and two currently continue to Cardiff Bay.

There are bus services from outside the station, including National Express.

Preceding station	National Rail	Following station
Cardiff Queen Street	Transport for Wales; Merthyr line	Llandaf
Cardiff Queen Street	Transport for Wales; Rhondda line	Llandaf
