= A roads in Zone 4 of the Great Britain numbering scheme =

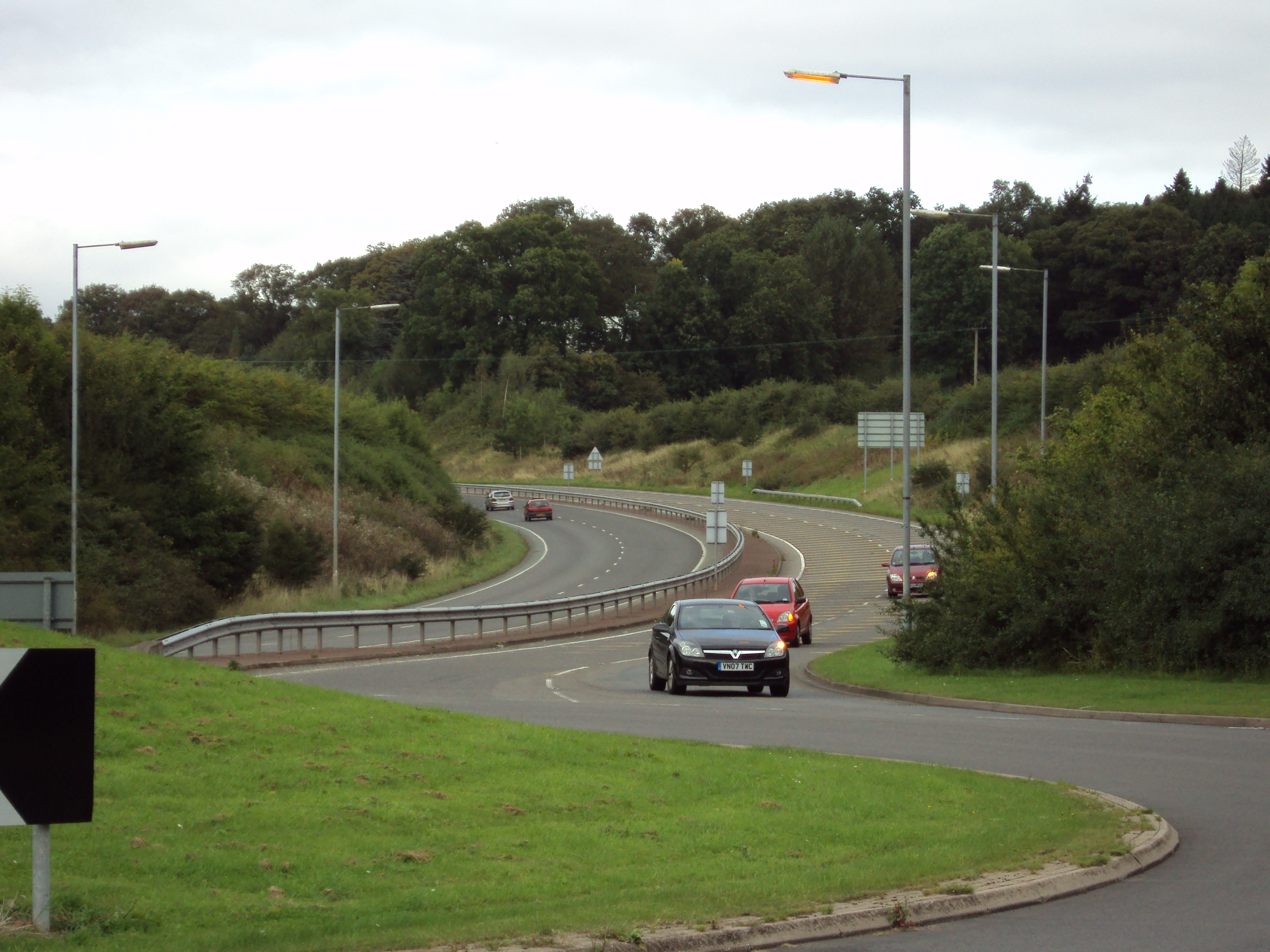
Looking north up the A441 Alvechurch Bypass from the roundabout at the junction of the A441 and B4120 roads between Alvechurch and Bordesley, Worcestershire, England

The numbering zones for A-roads in Great Britain

List of A roads in zone 4 in Great Britain starting north of the A4 and south/west of the A5 (roads beginning with 4).

== Single- and double-digit roads ==
| Road | From | To | Notes |
|---|---|---|---|
| A4 | City of London (Holborn Circus) | A403 at Avonmouth | Originally London to Bath |
| A40 | A1 at City of London (near St. Paul's Cathedral) | Fishguard | The longest A road in Zone 4 at 256 miles long The flyover near Shepherd's Bush (Westway) was formerly A40(M), but was downgraded to A40 in May 2000. |
| A41 | Central London (near Marble Arch) | A553 at Birkenhead | A large section of the former A41, from Bicester to Solihull, was downgraded when the northern extension of the M40 motorway was opened, as was a section in Birmingham due to other road improvements; most of it is now the non-contiguous B4100. A41 rerouted along new dual carriageway, Black Country New Road, between West Bromwich and Wednesbury. Old route through Hill Top renumbered A4196. |
| A42 | Kegworth | Appleby Magna | A continuation of the M42, hence the use of A42 despite being entirely in Zone 5. Previously allocated to a road from Reading to Birmingham; this became part of the A329, the A423 (this section now the A4074 and A4158), and the A34 (section from Oxford to the M42 is now the A4144, A44, A3400). |
| A43 | M40 motorway Junction 10 north of Bicester | Stamford | Formerly continued along present route of B430. |
| A44 | Oxford | Aberystwyth | Officially the most dangerous road in Wales between Aberystwyth and Llangurig. Route between Evesham and A422 originally designated A4538. |
| A45 | Birmingham | Thrapston | Previously continued along route of current A14 to Felixstowe |
| A46 | Bath | Cleethorpes | The section from Cheltenham to Heath End (North of Stratford on Avon) was mostly reclassified as B4632 and much of what was previously the A435 from Cheltenham to Bidford was renamed the A46. A piece of A438 from M5 J9 to Teddington also became part of the A46. |
| A47 | Birmingham | Lowestoft | The original section between Birmingham and Nuneaton has mostly been now de-classified to B-roads, while the section between Nuneaton and Leicester via Hinckley has been largely de-trunked since the M69 runs a similar route. A12 from Great Yarmouth to Lowestoft redesignated as A47 in 2017. |
| A48 | Highnam near Gloucester | Carmarthen | Originally began in Worcester. Worcester to Newport is now A449. |
| A49 | Ross-on-Wye | Bamber Bridge | |

== Triple-digit roads ==
Only roads that have individual articles have been linked in the "Road" column below.

| Road | From | To | Notes |
|---|---|---|---|
| A400 | Central London (Trafalgar Square) | Archway | Takes the route of the Northern line, Charing Cross Branch and High Barnet Branch |
| A401 | Central London (Piccadilly Circus) | Angel | Home to the famous Shaftesbury Avenue. |
| A402 | Central London (Marble Arch) | Stamford Brook, Chiswick | Home to Bayswater Road. |
| A403 | M48 motorway, _{J1 near Aust} | Avonmouth | A road of the same number ran down Western Avenue, London until 1946 when the A40 was diverted along the route. |
| A404 | Central London (Edgware Road station) | M40 Junction 9B near Maidenhead, where it connects with A404(M) | The London section is called Harrow Road for most of its length. Originally ran through Pinner, but now by-passes it using parts of the old A410 and A4090 and the old route through Pinner has now been declassified |
| A405 | Leavesden Green | Near Park Street | Originally used from Gunnersbury Park to Wembley in West London. The section from Gunnersbury Park to Hanger Lane became part of the A406 North Circular Road when it opened and the route north to Sudbury Town became the A4005. |
| A406 | M4 J1 at Chiswick Roundabout (A205),Gunnersbury | Beckton | The North Circular Road |
| A407 | Harlesden | Child's Hill | Through Willesden including the High Road and Cricklewood. Runs from the A598 to the A404. Originally used on a road from Hambrook to Downend. Now the A4174 and A4017. |
| A408 | Heathrow Airport | Uxbridge | The southern section in Sipson due to be demolished to make way for Heathrow Airport 3rd runway |
| A409 | Northwick Park Hospital | Bushey | through the middle of Wealdstone and the western part of Stanmore known as Stanmore Common |
| A410 | Pinner | Edgware | Uxbridge Road, through Stanmore Broadway, then London Road and Spur Road meeting the A41. Original western section now part of A404 |
| A411 | Watford | Barnet | Meets the A41 twice between which it goes through the centre of Watford, Bushey Arches and Bushey Heath, then through the northern part of Elstree, across Stirling Corner through Arkley and into Barnet |
| A412 | Slough | Garston | Was the main artery for this corridor and used to continue to St Albans prior to the construction of the M25. It provides interchange to the A4 in Slough, the A40/M40 at the Denham Roundabout, the M25 in Maple Cross, the A404 in Rickmansworth town centre, the A411 on a partially grade separated dual carriageway in Watford town centre, and the A41 in North Watford. |
| A413 | Gerrards Cross | Towcester | |
| A414 | Near Hemel Hempstead | Maldon | Section from Hemel Hempstead to the Park Street Roundabout was the M10 before 2009. |
| A415 | Berinsfield | Witney | |
| A416 | Amersham | Berkhamsted | |
| A417 | Streatley | Leominster | |
| A418 | M40 motorway _{J8a} | Ascott, Buckinghamshire | |
| A419 | Whitminster | Swindon | |
| A420 | Bristol | Oxford | |
| A421 | Croughton | Wyboston | Forms the H8 Standing Way in Milton Keynes. |
| A422 | Bedford | Worcester | Concurrent with the A46 between Stratford-upon-Avon and Alcester. Forms the H3 Monks Way in Milton Keynes. |
| A423 | Hinksey Hill | Coventry | Formerly ran from Maidenhead to Tamworth via Oxford and Banbury and Coventry, and a small section of this remains as part of the Oxford Ring Road. Now begins its former route at Banbury. Section beyond Coventry now B4098 and A51. |
| A424 | Burford | A44 near Bourton-on-the-Hill | |
| A425 | Daventry | Warwick | Route between the junctions with the A452 and the A46 previously part of A41. |
| A426 | Leicester | Southam | |
| A427 | Market Harborough | Oundle | |
| A428 | Coventry | Cambridge | This road is now split in two parts between Great Barford and Eaton Socon due to the extension of the A421 to the A1. |
| A429 | Chippenham | Coventry | |
| A430 | Quedgeley | Longford, Gloucester | Canal in Gloucester realigned in 2006 as part of A430 Western Relief Road construction. Originally used on a road between Chippenham and Bristol. Became a portion of an extended A420 in 1935. |
| A431 | Bristol | Bath | |
| A432 | Bristol | Old Sodbury | |
| A433 | A46 at Dunkirk | A429 SW of Cirencester | |
| A434 | Unused | | Used to run from the A429 near Malmesbury to the A38 near Hardwicke, south of Gloucester. Malmesbury–Nailsworth section now B4014; section north of Stroud became part of A419, now part of B4008. |
| A435 | Birmingham | Cirencester | Concurrent with the A46 between Alcester and Teddington Hands |
| A436 | A417 near Brockworth | A44 near Salford, Oxfordshire | |
| A437 | Harlington, London | A40 Western Avenue near Ickenham | Originally Gloucester to Newport; became a portion of a rerouted A48 in 1935. |
| A438 | M5 motorway _{Junction 9} | A470 near Llanfilo | |
| A439 | Stratford-upon-Avon | A46 4 miles SW of Warwick | |
| A440 | Reserved | | Reserved for Bristol Road. Used to run from Pershore to Great Malvern Downgraded in the 1960s, with the Pershore to Upton section becoming an extension of the A4104 and most of the reminder becoming the B4211. The westernmost section in Great Malvern itself remained Class I, becoming part of the A4532, but this was downgraded in the 2000s with the B4211 extended over it. Crossed River Severn on swingbridge (demolished 1940) in Upton-upon-Severn. |
| A441 | Birmingham | Cookhill | Previously continued along present alignment of B4088. |
| A442 | Droitwich | Whitchurch | |
| A443 | Worcester | Newnham Bridge | |
| A444 | Coventry | Burton upon Trent | Short gap in Coventry due to incomplete construction of Phoenix Way. |
| A445 | Warwick | A45 at Ryton-on-Dunsmore | |
| A446 | Little Packington | Roughley | |
| A447 | Hinckley | Coalville | The original route through Hinckley was by-passed by a new road completed in the early 1990s |
| A448 | Kidderminster | Studley, Warwickshire | The original route between Bromsgrove and Redditch was by-passed by a dual carriageway in the 1970s after Redditch was developed into a new town |
| A449 | Newport | Stafford | Used to continue beyond M4. Route to M5 motorway previously A4538. |
| A450 | Torton | West Hagley | Originally continued along present alignment of B4187. |
| A451 | Stourbridge | Great Witley | |
| A452 | Leamington Spa | Brownhills | Known as Chester Road for most of route between A5 and M42. Link road between A425 and M40 J14 previously A41. |
| A453 | Nottingham | Birmingham (Perry Barr) | Concurrent with A5127 (former A38) in Sutton Coldfield. Part of old route reinstated as A453 to serve East Midlands Airport. |
| A454 | Bridgnorth | Four Oaks | The section through Willenhall was renumbered in the 1970s following the completion of The Keyway by-passing the south of the town, and further renumbering took place in 1995 on the completion of the Black Country Route. Used to continue direct to Bridgnorth town centre. Rerouted along new alignment to meet A458 near Stanmore when bypass opened. |
| A455 | Unused | | First used from Birmingham to Stafford until 1935 when it became part of a northern extension of the A34. Next used from M4 J24 in Ringland, Newport to George Street Bridge. Became part of the A48 Southern Distributor Road in 2004 and the rest is now Corporation Road. |
| A456 | Birmingham | Woofferton | The section through Halesowen was renumbered to B4183 and A458 when the by-pass opened in the 1960s. Originally started on A41 in city centre, it later started on the Inner Ring Road but now starts on the Middle Ring Road (A4540). |
| A457 | Birmingham | Sedgley | The original route through Smethwick town centre was renumbered when a by-pass opened in about 1970. Also used to pass through Oldbury town centre. Has two branches in Sedgley: Tipton Road and Gate Street. |
| A458 | Mallwyd | Quinton | Originally started in Cross Foxes Inn. Further renumberings have taken place over the years, notably when the town of Bridgnorth was by-passed in 1985, and when the western section became part of the A470. Section between Halesowen and Quinton previously A456. |
| A459 | Halesowen | Wolverhampton | Renumbering took place when Dudley town centre was by-passed by a new route of the A461 in 1999. The road continued south of Halesowen towards Bromsgrove until the 1970s. Also used to meet Ring Road in Wolverhampton but now terminates at A4123, Grove Street. Until the 1960s ran down Dudley Street in Wolverhampton. After this road was pedestrianised, followed route of B4158, B4160 and part of A460 via Garrick Street, Market Street, Princess Street and Stafford Street to Five Ways. However Stafford Street was taken over by the A449 when old A449, Waterloo Road, declassified in 1980s. |
| A460 | Wolverhampton | Rugeley | The section through the centre of Cannock was renumbered A4601 in 1989 when the town's by-pass opened. Currently only link to M6 North from M54 Junction 1. Originally terminated in Princes Square in Wolverhampton. |
| A461 | Lichfield | Wollaston, West Midlands | Concurrent with the A41 between Wednesbury & Great Bridge. Previously passed through Brierley Hill town centre. Old route through Dudley town centre renumbered or declassified when bypass opened in 1999. In 2008, the bypass was named Duncan Edwards Way. |
| A462 | Essington | Wednesbury | The section through Darlaston town centre became unclassified when a new by-pass opened in the late 1960s |
| A463 | Wombourne | Willenhall | The section beyond Coseley was either renumbered or became unclassified when the Black Country Route was completed between 1986 and 1995. Part of former route in Bilston replaced by A4039 and B4484. Concurrent with A454 between The Keyway and Armstrong Way. |
| A464 | Oaken | Hollinswood | Primary route between Wolverhampton and Telford for non-motorway vehicles via Albrighton and Shifnal Originally used between Oaken and Nantwich. Renumbered to A41 from Oaken to Hinstock and A529 from there to Nantwich in 1935. |
| A465 | Bromyard | M4 motorway Junction 45, Llandarcy | |
| A466 | King's Thorn | Chepstow | |
| A467 | Duffryn, Newport | A465, Brynmawr | |
| A468 | Bassaleg, Newport | A470, Nantgarw | |
| A469 | A4161, Roath, Cardiff | A465, Rhymney | |
| A470 | Cardiff | Llandudno | Original north end was at Brecon. Later extended north. |
| A471 | Unused | | Ran from Abergavenny to Usk. In 1935 the section from Abergavenny to Llanvihangel Gobion became part of a rerouted A40 and the remainder was downgraded to the B4598 in the 1970s. |
| A472 | Treharris | Usk | |
| A473 | Pontypridd | Bridgend | Originally started at Treforest but following the completion of the Church Village bypass it now starts at Upper Boat and the section between Treforest and Gwaun Meisgyn is now downgraded to the B4595. |
| A474 | Briton Ferry | Ammanford | |
| A475 | Newcastle Emlyn | Lampeter | Originally used from Swansea to Carmarthen. Much of the route became part of a rerouted A48 (at the time, the A48 followed the current A484) and the southern section between Swansea and Penllergaer became part of the A483 in 1935. |
| A476 | Llanelli | Llandeilo | |
| A477 | St Clears | Johnston | |
| A478 | Cardigan | Tenby | |
| A479 | Glanusk | Llyswen | Runs through the heart of the Brecon Beacons in Wales. Originally went northwest to Rhayader, but this section became part of the A470. Another A479 runs along Empire Way, Wembley (North West of London); this was formerly B4565 until 2007. |
| A480 | A44 at Lyonshall | A438 west of Hereford | |
| A481 | Somewhere near Llanfihangel, Llandegley | Llanelwedd | |
| A482 | Aberaeron | Llanwrda | |
| A483 | Swansea | Chester | by way of Wrexham. Becomes A5 road in the vicinity of Oswestry. |
| A484 | Cardigan | Cadle near Swansea | by way of Newcastle Emlyn, Carmarthen and Llanelli |
| A485 | Tanerdy | Llanfarian | |
| A486 | New Quay | A484 near Saron | |
| A487 | Haverfordwest | Bangor | |
| A488 | Penybont | Shrewsbury | |
| A489 | Craven Arms | Machynlleth | |
| A490 | Churchstoke | Llanfyllin | |
| A491 | Lydiate Ash | Wall Heath | Used to terminate in Bromsgrove. Originally used between Shrewsbury and Cemmaes Road. Shrewsbury to Mallwyd became an extension of the A458 and the rest became part of a rerouted A4084 (now A470) in 1935. |
| A492 | Unused | | Used to run from Llangurig to Newtown. Became a portion of an extended A470 while the 1935 extension into Newtown reverted to the A489. |
| A493 | Machynlleth | Dolgellau | The road is approximately 32 miles long and is next to the coast for the majority of the journey. |
| A494 | Queensferry | Dolgellau | Extension to M56 motorway opened late 2008. |
| A495 | A525 west of Whitchurch | A458 west of Llanfair Caereinion | Multiplexes with A5 Oswestry bypass and then A483 as far as Llynclys. |
| A496 | Llanelltyd | Blaenau Ffestiniog | Via Barmouth; originally went north to Llandudno (this became part of the A470). |
| A497 | Porthmadog | Nefyn | |
| A498 | Pen-y-Gwryd | Porthmadog | |
| A499 | A487 | Abersoch | |

== Four-digit roads (40xx) ==
| Road | From | To | Notes |
|---|---|---|---|
| A4000 | A406 in Acton Town | A404 in Harlesden | Originally began at the A4 in Chiswick (this section is now part of the A406) and originally ended at the A407 (this section is now unclassified). |
| A4001 | Hanwell | Hanwell | Still signed, but may not exist because it and the A3002 form a one way pair. |
| A4002 | Unused | | Was the Tubbs Road / Nightingale Road one-way system in Harlesden, now unclassified. |
| A4003 | Brondesbury | Willesden | Willesden Lane |
| A4004 | Unused | | Was a road in Harlesden from the A407 to the A404 (now part of the A407 and the old A407 is now Craven Park, an unusual road name). |
| A4005 | West London _{(Hanger Lane Gyratory)} | Roxeth | |
| A4006 | Harrow | West Hendon | Also known as Kenton Road and Kingsbury Road |
| A4007 | Iver Heath | Uxbridge | |
| A4008 | Hatch End | Watford | Originally ran from Hurley to Temple, cutting the corner between what was then the A415 (later A423, now A4130) and A416 (now A404). Renumbered as a spur of the A423 in 1935, but has since been declassified after dualling of the A404 and downgrading of the A423 to A4130. |
| A4009 | Unused | | Ran from the A32 (now A4155) in Caversham to the A415 (now A423) in Nettlebed. Downgraded to a southern extension of the B481. |
| A4010 | High Wycombe | Aylesbury | |
| A4011 | Unused | | Ran from the A413 in Wendover to the A41 in Aston Clinton. Downgraded to an extension of the B4009 after the towns it connected were bypassed. |
| A4012 | Hockliffe | A4146 | |
| A4013 | Kingsditch | Benhall | Originally a link road in Aylesbury; became a portion of the A41, but is now declassified. A portion of the route is now gone, with a shopping center built on top. |
| A4014 | Unused | | Ran along Gravel Walk from the A417 to the A420 (now B4019) in Faringdon; this became part of a rerouted A417, while the old route of the A417 is now an extended A4095, London Street, and Stanford Road. |
| A4015 | Cheltenham | Cheltenham | Originally ran along Kings Hill Road and Bath Road in Swindon, linking the A361 to the A420. Renumbered to the A4289; was possibly the B4006 before this. |
| A4016 | Unused | | Ran along St. James Parade, Monmouth Street and Monmouth Place in Bath. When the A4 was extended in 1935, the A4016 became entirely in Zone 3 and was renumbered as a spur of the A367. The central section was declassified after WWII. May have been used in Cheltenham along the former route of the A46; number is not shown on maps but does appear in a DfT road list from around 2002. A 1972 OS map indicates that this version of the A4016 dates from the late 1960s or early 1970s, possibly before construction of the M5 through the town. The route through the town center is now unclassified, Lower Winchcombe Street returned to the A46, Upper Winchcombe Street is now part of the A435, and the remainder is now the B4632. |
| A4017 | Kingswood | A4174 at Bromley Heath | Soundwell Road |
| A4018 | Bristol | Cribbs Causeway | |
| A4019 | Coombe Hill | Cheltenham | |
| A4020 | Shepherd's Bush | Denham | Known as the Uxbridge Road for most of its length (with short stretches known by other names). Follows the former route of the A40. Originally ran from Beeches Green to Cairnscross. Became a portion of the A419 in 1935 when it was rerouted. |
| A4021 | Unused | | Ran from A440 (now B4211) in Rhydd to Powick (became the B4424 at the same time the A440 became the B4211). |
| A4022 | Unused | | Ran from A441 to A448 in Redditch via Plymouth Road. |
| A4023 | Redditch | Matchborough | Used to run from Redditch to Coventry but nearly all the section has been downgraded to the B4101 upon completion of the M42 in 1986. |
| A4024 | Unused | | Ran from A448 (now B4184) in Aston Fields to A38 (now B4094) Stoke Heath. mostly became part of the A38 when the eastern bypass was complete, rest is now Stoke Road. |
| A4025 | Stourport-on-Severn | A449 | |
| A4026 | Shenstone | Little Aston | Known as Little Aston Lane. Has a weight limit imposed in a northerly direction only. Unsigned from A454. |
| A4027 | Unused | | Ran from A47 to A41 in Birmingham. Absorbed into the A4400 and is now part of the B4100. |
| A4028 | Unused | | Ran from the A38 and A455 to the A47 in Birmingham. Absorbed into the A4400 and now part of the B4100 (or B4114). |
| A4029 | Edgbaston | Edgbaston | Pebble Mill Road, dual carriageway, formerly home to the BBC Pebble Mill Studios. |
| A4030 | Bearwood | Smethwick | From around 1930 to the mid-1960s, this road continued along the route of the present A4040 to the A441 just north of Kings Norton. |
| A4031 | Smethwick | Walsall | |
| A4032 | Bristol | Bristol | Continuation of the M32 to the A4044 inner ring road. Originally ran along Park Road in Hagley; declassified when the A491 bypass was built. |
| A4033 | A4123 near Dudley | Oldbury | Previously also met A461 at Burnt Tree Island, Dudley. When the island was removed and replaced with the current traffic light junction, the A4033 was rerouted to a separate junction with the A4123. |
| A4034 | Quinton | West Bromwich | |
| A4035 | Unused | | Used to run from West Bromwich to Great Bridge where it joined the A461 towards Dudley. This road was downgraded to an unclassified road (Great Bridge Street) upon the completion of the Black Country Spine Road in 1995. |
| A4036 | Dudley | Pedmore | |
| A4037 | Wednesbury | Dudley | Leabrook Road, Great Bridge to Wednesbury formerly A461. |
| A4038 | Walsall | Moxley | |
| A4039 | Bilston | Penn, West Midlands | Short extension in Bilston along former A463 alignment (Coseley Road). |
| A4040 | | | Birmingham Outer ring road. Most of route covered by Outer Circle bus service 11. The section from the A456 in Bearwood to the A38 in Selly Oak was originally numbered B4123. In the 1930s the road beyond Harborne (current end of the A4123) was upgraded to form part of the A4123 (which continued to the A441 north of Kings Norton) before becoming the A4030. It was designated A4040 in the 1960s. As part of the Selly Oak "triangle" development, the former Eastbound carriageway (Chapel Lane) was renumbered B3800 as Harborne Lane was dualled. Originally ran from Wall Heath to Kidderminster which became a portion of the A449 in 1935. |
| A4041 | West Bromwich | Streetly | Originally ran east of Kidderminster, bypassing the town. Became a portion of the A449 in 1935. |
| A4042 | Abergavenny | A48, Newport | |
| A4043 | Blaenavon B4246 | Pontypool, A472 | |
| A4044 | Redcliffe, Bristol | St James Barton, Bristol | Bristol Inner Circuit: Redcliffe Way, Temple Way, Bond Street Originally ran from Crumlin to Brynmawr. Renumbered as a northern extension of the A467 in 1935. |
| A4045 | Unused | | Ran from Blaina Road to the A465 (now A4047) in Brynmawr. Now the B4248. Number later used for Victoria and Newmarket streets between the A438 and A49 in Hereford. Became the A438 and A49 due to pedestrianization in Hereford. |
| A4046 | A465, Rassau | A467, Aberbeeg | |
| A4047 | A4048, Tredegar | A465, Brynmawr | Originally ran from Ebbw Vale to Waun-y-Pound; now a spur of the A4046. |
| A4048 | A467, Crosskeys | A465, Tredegar | |
| A4049 | A4048, Pontllanfraith | A469, New Tredegar | |
| A4050 | A4232, Culverhouse Cross,_{Cardiff} | A4055, Barry | Originally ran from Pengam to Tir-Phil; renumbered as a northern extension of the A469 in 1935. |
| A4051 | Newport | North Cwmbran | Originally ran along Dyvenor Street in Merthyr Tydfil. |
| A4052 | Unused | | First used on a short section of old A40 along Blue Street in Carmarthen (the remainder became the A4116). Declassified due to town center development. Also used in Newport linking the A48 to the docks near Watch House Parade. Later renumbered as an extension of the A4042 and has since been declassified; the completion of the A4042/A48 rendered the route redundant. |
| A4053 | | | Coventry Inner Ring Road Originally ran across the southern side of Cardiff city center from the A48 to the A4055. Later renumbered as an extension of the A4055 and is now part of the A4160 after the A4055 was rerouted. |
| A4054 | A4119, Llandaff,_{Cardiff} | A470, Cefn-Coed-y-Cymmer | |
| A4055 | A4232, Cardiff Bay,_{Cardiff} | Barry Island, Barry | |
| A4056 | Unused | | Ran from the A48 in Ely to the A470; now part of the A48. Was planned to be replaced by the A48(M) Llantrisant Radial, but this was never built. |
| A4057 | Unused | | Ran along Bedwas road in Caerphilly, cutting the corner between the A468 and A469. It became a spur of the A469 in 1935 and is now part of the B4600. Number later used in the late 1970s for the Droitwich Spa bypass; became a portion of the A38 in the early 1980s. |
| A4058 | A470, Pontypridd | A4061, Treorchy | Originally started at Glyntaff but the sections between Glyntaff, Treforest and Pontypridd was downgraded to the B4595 following the completion of the Church Village bypass. This road originally ran through the village of Trealaw but following the completion of the Rhondda by-pass the section between Porth and Llwynypia was downgraded to the B4278 and the road now runs through the village of Dinas where the B4278 originally ran and also the former part of the A4119 near Llwynypia. |
| A4059 | A470, Abercynon | A470, Between Brecon and Cefn-Coed-y-Cymmer | |
| A4060 | A470, Pentrebach | A465, Dowlais Top | Originally ran along Market Street (the 1922 Draft Road Lists claim Wyndham Street) from the then-A48 to the A4061 in Bridgend. Made redundant by completion of the A4061 and is now part of the pedestrianized area in Bridgend town center. |
| A4061 | Bridgend | Hirwaun | |
| A4062 | Unused | | Ran along Wigan Terrace between the A4061 and A4065 in Glamorgan. Became a branch of the A4065 in 1935; declassified after 1989 when the A4065 was rerouted. Number later used between the A40 and A438 near Brecon as an upgrading of the B4557. Downgraded to the B4602 except for the southern end, which is unclassified. |
| A4063 | Bridgend | Cymmer | |
| A4064 | Sarn | Blaengarw | |
| A4065 | Tondu | Brynmenyn | |
| A4066 | St Clears | Pendine | Via Llanmiloe and Laugharne Originally ran from Hirwaun to Brecon Beacons. Renumbered as an extension of the A4059 in 1935. |
| A4067 | West Cross, Swansea | Sennybridge | |
| A4068 | Gurnos | Brynamman | Originally ran along part of the Swansea Valley from Morriston to Ystalyfera. Renumbered as a northern extension of the A4067 in 1935; much of the route is now the B4603 except the northernmost section which is unclassified. Another portion was closed and abandoned altogether following a landslide in 1965. |
| A4069 | Llandovery | Gwaun-Cae-Gurwen | Originally ran along Castle Street and Wind Street in Swansea. Renumbered as a portion of the A483 in 1935 and is now part of the B4489. The route begins at the junction with the A474 at the north of Gwaun-Cae-Gurwen, and travels through Lower Brynamman and Brynamman. The route then crosses over the Black Mountain range of the Brecon Beacons and emerges near Felindre near Llangadog. It crosses through Llangadog and then continues northeast until the junction with the A40 at Llandovery. It reaches a height of 493 m (1,617 ft) above sea level. |
| A4070 | Unused | | Ran from the A483 in Fforestfach to the A484 east of Loughor Bridge. Reclassified in the 1990s as the B4620 due to construction of a new approach road to Loughor Bridge (now the A484). |
| A4071 | Dunsmore Heath | Rugby | Originally ran between the then-A40 and A474 in Llandelio. Now unclassified. |
| A4072 | Unused | | First used in 1922 south of Narberth between the A40 and A478. After the A40 was rerouted in the late 1920s, the A4072 was downgraded to an extension of the B3415 as it no longer met a Class I road at its eastern end. Used again in 1935 from A468 at Tredegar Park to A467 (now B4591) at Rogerstone after the B4242 and B4243 were upgraded to Class I status. The southern section became part of the A467 in 1983 and the remainder was declassified. |
| A4073 | Unused | | Originally ran between the A40 and A478 east of Narberth. After the A40 was rerouted in the late 1920s, the A4073 no longer had a Class I road to start from and was downgraded to a spur of the B4314. Used again in 1935, cutting the corner between the A438 and A479 in Llyswen and was the B4344 before it was upgraded to Class I status. Now part of the A470. |
| A4074 | Iffley | Caversham | Links Reading with Oxford Originally ran between Narberth and Narberth Castle along High Street. When the A40 was rerouted in the late 1920s, the A4074 was downgraded to Class II status as the B4313, but is now part of the A478 one-way system. |
| A4075 | Canaston Bridge | Pembroke | |
| A4076 | Haverfordwest | Milford Haven | |
| A4077 | Crickhowell | Gilwern & Govilon | |
| A4078 | Talgarth | Three Cocks | |
| A4079 | Three Cocks | Llyswen | |
| A4080 | Menai Bridge | A55 | Originally ran between Llanwrda and Abermorlain. Renumbered as a portion of the A483 in 1935, but became part of the A40 after World War II. |
| A4081 | Llandrindod Wells | Newbridge-on-Wye | |
| A4082 | Whitley, Coventry | Binley, Coventry | Called Allard Way between B4110 and A428. The section between Whitley and the B4110 was originally part of the A423. The A4082 was previously the designated number for a short stretch of the current A4081 in Llandrindod Wells (Ithon Road and Spa Road). |
| A4083 | Unused | | Ran from the A5 southeast of Oswestry to A483 in Oswestry. Became the A5 and B4579 due to completion of the A483 Oswestry bypass and rerouting of the A5. |
| A4084 | Unused | | Originally ran from Mallwyd to Dolgallau. Became a portion of the A458 in 1935 when it was extended west and is now part of the A470 after it was extended north in the 1970s. Next used in 1935 from the A489 near Cemmaes to Mallwyd on an old section of the A491 (the remainder became the A458, which ironically replaced the original A4084). Became a portion of the A470 in the 1970s after it was extended. |
| A4085 | Minffordd | Caernarfon | The current route was formerly A487 before it swapped numbers. First used from the A44 in Llangurig to the A492 east of town, forming one side of a triangle. Became a spur of the A492 in 1935, but after the A492 was declassified and closed in the 1980s, the route became part of the A470. Next used in 1935 from the A489 in Tremadog to the A499 in Llanwrda; this was originally the B4410 before it was upgraded to Class I status. Became a part of the A487 in the 1960s after it swapped numbers; the old route of the A487 is now the current A4085. |
| A4086 | Capel Curig | Caernarfon | |
| A4087 | Bangor | Bangor | Originally ran from the A5 at the south side of the Menai Suspension Bridge to the A499 near Capel-y-Graig. Became a portion of the A487 when it was extended north to the A5. |
| A4088 | Willesden | Sudbury, London | |
| A4089 | Alperton | Wembley Park | |
| A4090 | Wembley | North Harrow | Used to run beyond North Harrow along George V Avenue to Hatch End, but this became part of the A404 in the 1980s. Originally ran from the A404 to the A416 in Amersham. Became a spur of the A404 in 1935 and is now part of the A4154. |
| A4091 | Tamworth | Wishaw | |
| A4092 | Tonyrefail | Llangeinor | |
| A4092 | Bearwood | Cape Hill | Duplicate number. Connects A457 to A4030. |
| A4093 | Rhondda | Llangeinor | |
| A4094 | Loudwater | Maidenhead | |
| A4095 | Faringdon | Bicester | |
| A4096 | Unused | | Ran from A38 in Claypits to A419 (now Bath Road, Alkerton Road and Spring Hill); section east to Stonehouse became part of the A419 when the M5 was built, while the old route of the A419 became the B4008. |
| A4097 | Minworth | Kingsbury | The current A4097 was originally mostly unclassified except for the part between Minworth and A446 which originally formed part of the B4141 (which briefly started at Salford Circus) before the section now part of the A38 became the A4097. The B4141 was then extended to the A423 (now A51) near Kingsbury. Upon completion of the Sutton Coldfield bypass, the A38 took over the route of the A4097 and the B4141 was then upgraded to the A4097 as it is today. |
| A4098 | Moxley | Wednesbury | |
| A4099 | Halesowen | Blackheath | |

== Four-digit roads (41xx) ==
| Road | From | To | Notes |
|---|---|---|---|
| A4100 | Blackheath | Brierley Hill | |
| A4101 | Kingswinford | Dudley | Section from Scotts Green Island to Dudley town centre previously A461. Between 1922 and 1925 this route was numbered B4177. |
| A4102 | Amblecote | | Duplicate number. Amblecote A4102 is one way street running between A461 and A491. Between 1922 and 1925 the Amblecote road was numbered B4181. |
| A4102 | Merthyr Tydfil | Merthyr Tydfil | Duplicate number. Amblecote A4102 is one way street running between A461 and A491. Between 1922 and 1925 the Amblecote road was numbered B4181. |
| A4103 | Worcester | Hereford | |
| A4104 | A449 in Little Malvern | A44 Pershore | Upton-upon-Severn to Pershore originally part of A440. The section heading north from Pershore town centre was previously part of the B4082. |
| A4105 | | | The original A4105 is now the B4218 in Malvern but was originally the B4217. A later A4105 formed a short link between the A49 and A456 in Brimfield Herefordshire, having previously been upgraded from unclassified to the B4528. Classified to A road status in 1971, it was declassified a few years later when the Brimfield bypass opened. |
| A4106 | Bridgend | Porthcawl | |
| A4107 | Bwlch y Clawdd | Port Talbot | |
| A4108 | | | First used in the mid-1920s from Cymer to Glyncorrwg when the B4185 was upgraded to Class I status. This became an extension of the A4063 in 1935 when the A4107 replaced the A4063 west of Cymer and has since been declassified. The second A4108 ran from Gelilydan to Congl-y-wal, created around 1947 when the B4408 was upgraded to Class I status. Later became part of the A470 to create a north–south cross-country route through Wales. |
| A4109 | Aberdulais | Glynneath | |
| A4110 | Leintwardine | Hereford | |
| A4111 | Near Whitney-on-Wye | Kington | |
| A4112 | Tenbury Wells | Eardisley | |
| A4113 | Bromfield | Knighton | |
| A4114 | Allesley | Willenhall | Previously part of the A45 before it was re-routed to run south of Coventry. Originally ran from Bladon Road to Oxford Road in Woodstock; this was part of the B4024 before it was upgraded in 1922 (the remainder was renumbered A4095). Became a spur of the A4095 in 1935 and was declassified by the 1950s. |
| A4115 | Templeton | Cross Hands | Was B4315 until 1935. Originally ran from Aberaeton to Lampeter; this was previously the B4340 before it was upgraded in the mid-1920s. Became part of a rerouted A482 in 1935. |
| A4116 | | | This was used for the original route of the A40 in Carmarthen when the Inner Relief Road opened and the A40 was rerouted along Morfa Lane. Due to the narrowness of the old A40 route, the A4116 was later declassified. First used between Stroud and Cirencester, designated in the mid-1920s when the B4069 was upgraded. Became part of a rerouted A419 in 1935. |
| A4117 | Near Bewdley | Ludlow | Passes Titterstone Clee Hill at 381 metres above sea level. |
| A4118 | Dyfatty Street, Swansea | Port Eynon | |
| A4119 | Tonypandy | Cardiff Bay | Originally began at Llwynypia but following the completion of the Porth Relief road the road became part of the A4058 Treorchy to Pontypridd route. |
| A4120 | Llanbadarn Fawr, Aberystwyth | Ponterwyd | It runs parallel with the A44, but on the other side of the Rheidol Valley. |
| A4121 | | | This was used for a short road in Wednesbury which ran along High Bullen from the A461 High Street to the A462 Upper High Street. It was classified in 1926 and was declassified some time later, possibly when the A461 was rerouted although this is uncertain. |
| A4122 | | | Cut the corner between the A425 and A423 south of Southam, designated in 1927. Unlike other short link roads, the A4122 did not become a spur in 1935, but kept its number. Now part of the A425 itself. |
| A4123 | Wolverhampton | Harborne, Birmingham | The road continued from the current terminus in Harborne to the A441 just north of Kings Norton along the current route of the A4040 from the 1930s to the 1960s. Named Birmingham New Road at one end, New Birmingham Road in the middleand Wolverhampton Road at the other end. Built 1924–1927 as part of a job creation scheme. Opened by Edward, Prince of Wales |
| A4124 | Wolverhampton | Brownhills | Wednesfield town centre bypassed in 2000s. Former route between Wood End Road and Wednesfield High School renumbered B4484. The A4124 ran only between Wolverhampton and Bloxwich from 1928 to the 1980s but the entire route was originally numbered B4155. |
| A4125 | Northwood | Bushey | Originally ran from Little Mill to Abergavenny; this was the B4245 until the late 1920s. Renumbered as a northern extension of the A4042 in 1935. |
| A4126 | Monmore Green | Coseley | Called Rookery Road between A4123 and A463. Not signposted off A463. |
| A4127 | Heston | Wembley | |
| A4128 | High Wycombe | Great Missenden | |
| A4129 | Princes Risborough | Thame | |
| A4130 | Burchetts Green | Rowstock | The section of road between Milton Hill and Rowstock was formerly part of the A34. |
| A4131 | | | Previously the road from the A47 at Camp Hill near Nuneaton to the original A5 in Atherstone. Now partly the B4111 and declassified. |
| A4132 | | | Previously only identified from DfT lists, but is now known to have linked the A472 and A469 at Ystrad Mynach. The eastern terminus differs depending on maps, but it followed Lewis Street east from the A472 and ran along either Bedwlwyn Street or Penalltau Road to the A469. Decommissioned, probably due to completion of the new eastern bypass of Ystrad Mynach. |
| A4133 | Great Witley | Droitwich Spa | |
| A4134 | | | Ran from the A439 in Evesham Place to the A34 in Stratford-upon-Avon; was the B4534 before it was upgraded to Class I status in the 1970s. Now the northern portion of the A4390. |
| A4135 | Tetbury | Slimbridge | The road was originally numbered B4066 and ended on the A38 in Cambridge, Gloucestershire. It was upgraded to A-road status around 1930. During construction of the M5 motorway, the road was rerouted to its present terminus in Slimbridge. |
| A4136 | Huntley, Gloucestershire | Monmouth | Both ends link to A40 – goes through Forest of Dean |
| A4137 | Whitchurch | Harewood, Herefordshire | |
| A4138 | Pontardulais | Llanelli | |
| A4139 | Tenby | Pembroke Dock | |
| A4140 | Wembley | Bushey Heath | Salmon Street, Fryent Way, Honeypot Lane, Marsh Lane. North of Stanmore Broadway as Stanmore Hill and The Common. |
| A4141 | Solihull (M42 J5) | A4177 at Five Ways, Warwickshire | Previously part of A41; section renumbered when an extension of the M40 motorway opened. The southern end of the road lies midway between Knowle and Warwick. Originally the southwestern portion of the Oxford Ring Road, from Botley to South Hinksey. Extended along the old A40 in the 1930s when it was moved to the Oxford northern bypass. The bypass was extended north around 1960, allowing the A34 to take over the southern extension of the A4141. The remainder later became the B4044. |
| A4142 | Heyford Hill, Oxford | Headington | Part of the Oxford Ring Road |
| A4143 | Llanfoist | Abergavenny | |
| A4144 | Pear Tree, Oxford | Redbridge Park and Ride | |
| A4145 | Watford | Rickmansworth | |
| A4146 | Milton Keynes | Hemel Hempstead | Section between Leighton Buzzard and Hemel Hempstead downgraded to B440 in 2017. Only a small stretch connecting the A414 and A4251 remains as the A4146 in Hemel Hempstead. Forms much of H10 Bletcham Way, V11 Tongwell Street and a small portion of H6 Childs Way in Milton Keynes. |
| A4147 | Hemel Hempstead | St Albans | |
| A4148 | Bescot | Bescot | Walsall Ring Road |
| A4149 | | | |
| A4150 | | | Wolverhampton Ring Road Originally the northern section of the Gloucester Ring Road. Later switched to a section of leftover A40 in the center of Gloucester (the ring road was renumbered to A40); became a portion of the A417 by 1946 and is now unclassified and partially pedestrianized. |
| A4151 | A48 at Elton, Gloucestershire | A4136 at Nailbridge | Through the Forest of Dean, main town on this road is Cinderford |
| A4152 | | | Ran from the A40 to the A4149 in Ross-on-Wye; now declassified, possibly when all Class I roads were removed from the town center following completion of the A40 eastern bypass. |
| A4153 | | | Ran from the A438 on the River Wye to the A438 just north of the Whitney Bridge; originally the B4350. Now part of a rerouted A438. |
| A4154 | Amersham | Amersham on the Hill | Originally ran from Ledbury to Ridgeway Cross; north of Ledbury was the southern end of the B4214 and the section from there via Bosbury to Westfield was the B4128. Downgraded by the 1970s; the B4214 got its section back while the remainder is now the B4220. |
| A4155 | Bourne End | Reading | By way of Little Marlow, Marlow, Medmenham, Henley-on-Thames, Lower Shiplake and Caversham |
| A4156 | Aylesbury | Aylesbury | Part of Oxford Road, connects A413 and A418. |
| A4157 | Aylesbury | Quarrendon | Aylesbury outer ring road |
| A4158 | Oxford | Iffley | |
| A4159 | Bow Street, Aberystwyth | A44 | Acts as a by-pass around the northern part of Aberystwyth. |
| A4160 | Newport Road, Cardiff | Llandough | Former A4055 and B4260. Number previously reserved in 1935 for upgrading the B489 to form a Swindon-East Anglia route with the A5160 (proposed to be used instead of the A505 for the A505/A601 route for number continuity). But the tonnage was not enough (and it was never going to be) to upgrade the road to Class I, so this proposal fell through and the route remains the B489. |
| A4161 | Ely Bridge, Cardiff | Southern Way, Cardiff | Runs along a part of the old A48. |
| A4162 | A4 at Sea Mills | A4018 at Westbury-on-Trym | Sylvan Way and Canford Lane |
| A4163 | | | Was reserved for Courtlands Drive (then the B4539) in Watford, but this change was never implemented. Route now unclassified. |
| A4164 | | | Ran from the A4093 at Hendreforgan to the B4564 near Gilfach Goch. Now an extension of the B4564. |
| A4165 | Oxford | Kidlington | Banbury Road |
| A4166 | | | Ran from the A38 to the A456 in Birmingham. Originally numbered B4129. |
| A4167 | Highgate | Sparkbrook | Connects A41 to A4540/A435. |
| A4168 | Woodsetton | Dudley | Originally ran between West Bromwich and Smethwick; initially numbered as B4168 and was the A4031 briefly in the late 1970s before becoming the A4168. However the real A4168 is in Dudley, making this use a duplicate. In 2004 the route was correctly renumbered to A4252, although some signs on the roundabout and approaches still showed A4168 as of December 2017. |
| A4169 | Shifnal | Much Wenlock | The section immediately south of Shifnal was turnpiked in 1763 as one of a number of roads from Stafford and Newport, but leaves this turning sharply westwards, along a road formerly part of the Madeley turnpikes. It ends when reaches the present A442 road, but resumes a short distance further north, becoming a southern bypass for Telford. It then crosses Buildwas Bridge and runs to Much Wenlock. |
| A4170 | | | Ran from Coventry City Centre to Keresley Green Road, originally part of the A423 until 1973. Downgraded to a portion of the B4098 in the late 1980s. |
| A4171 | Cainscross | Badbrook | |
| A4172 | Preston Cross | Trumpet | |
| A4173 | Stroud | Gloucester | |
| A4174 | Filton | Bedminster Down, Bristol | The Bristol or Avon Ring Road |
| A4175 | A4 / A4174 at Hicks Gate | Staple Hill | In two parts: Hick's Gate to A420 at Bridgeyate via Keynsham, and A4174 at Siston to Staple Hill |
| A4176 | A4 at Hotwells | A4018 at Blackboy Hill | Bridge Valley Road and Upper Belgrave Road, Bristol |
| A4177 | Meer End | Warwick | Section south of Five Ways previously part of A41; section renumbered when an extension of the M40 motorway opened. |
| A4178 | Oxhey Village | Watford | |
| A4179 | | | Ran along Wembley Hill Road, Empire Way and Bridge Road in Wembley; originally part of the B4565 and A4089. The section along Bridge Road returned to the A4089 while the remainder became the A479 (possibly a typo) when the new Wembley Stadium opened in 2007. |
| A4180 | Yeading | Northwood | Starts at the White Hart Roundabout in Yeading at a junction with the A312. The section between this roundabout and the Polish War Memorial used to be the B455 but was "double-upgraded" to primary route status when the A312 Parkway bypass was built during the mid-1990s. Then becomes West End Road, High Street (Ruislip), Bury Street and Ducks Hill Road heading north towards the A404 Rickmansworth Road. |
| A4181 | | | Not shown on maps; only appears in the 2005 DfT Road List as running along Roebuck Lane in West Bromwich, formerly B4168. If the number was used, it was probably for a short time in the late 1960s as the route was split by the M5 in the early 1970s. The nearby A4252 now serves A4181's function. |
| A4182 | West Bromwich | West Bromwich | |
| A4183 | Abingdon | Lodge Hill | Oxford Road, Abingdon. This road was formerly part of the A34. The remaining part of the road between Lodge Hill and Hinksey Hill near Oxford has since been unclassified. |
| A4184 | Evesham | Evesham | |
| A4185 | Rowstock | Chilton | This road was formerly part of the A34. |
| ~~A4186~~ - ~~A4188~~ | Unused | | |
| A4189 | Redditch | Warwick | |
| ~~A4190~~ - ~~A4192~~ | Unused | | |
| A4193 | A465 in Hereford | A438 in Hereford | Commercial Road; unsigned. |
| A4194 | Reserved | | Reserved for the Hereford Southern Link Road from the A49/B4399 junction to the A465/B4349 junction. Modern maps erroneously show the number applying to the City Link Road, this is actually part of the A465. |
| ~~A4195~~ | Unused | | |
| A4196 | West Bromwich | Wednesbury | Formerly part of A41. |
| ~~A4197~~ | Unused | | |
| A4198 | Swindon | Swindon | Thamesdown Drive |
| ~~A4199~~ | Unused | | |

== Four-digit roads (42xx and higher) ==
| Road | From | To | Notes |
|---|---|---|---|
| A4200 | Central London (Aldwych) | Mornington Crescent, Camden | |
| A4201 | Central London (Piccadilly Circus) | Regent's Park | |
| A4202 | Hyde Park Corner | Marble Arch | Part of the London Inner Ring Road |
| A4203 | Unused | | Cut the corner between the A4 and A4202 in Hamilton Place. Became a portion of the A4202 by the 1940s; route is now unclassified due to dualling and realignment of Park Lane in the 1960s. |
| A4204 | Kensington | Notting Hill Gate | Kensington Church Street |
| A4205 | Edgware Road station | Bishops Bridge, Paddington | |
| A4206 | Notting Hill Gate | Paddington Basin | |
| A4207 | Westbourne Grove | Westbourne Park | |
| A4208 | Ludgate Circus | Holborn Circus | St Bride Street is closed off to traffic (except pushbikes) and Stonecutter Street is exit only. |
| A4209 | Edgware Road station | Lancaster Gate | |
| ~~A4210~~ | Unused | | |
| A4211 | | | Old route of A48 after the A48(M) Port Talbot Bypass was opened in the mid-1960s. Became the A48 again when the A48(M) was renumbered to M4 in the mid-1970s. |
| A4212 | Bala | Trawsfynydd | |
| A4213 | | | Ran across northern Carmarthen. Upgraded from the B4207 in the late 1960s, but was downgraded to the B4312 after the Carmarthen bypass was built. |
| A4214 | Llanelli | Hendy | Inside this ring-road is the main commerce area of Llanelli, including the shopping centre, supermarket, indoor and outdoor markets, bus-station, high street shops as well as multi-story, off-street and street parking. |
| A4215 | Libanus | Defynnog | |
| A4216 | Sketty | Gendros | |
| A4217 | Swansea | Llansamlet | |
| A4218 | Tenby | Tenby | |
| A4219 | Scleddau | Manorowen | |
| ~~A4220~~ | Unused | | |
| A4221 | Banwen | Abercraf | |
| A4222 | Cowbridge | Talbot Green | |
| A4223 | A4058 in Pontypridd | A470 in Pontypridd | |
| A4224 | | | Ran from Abercynon to Aberdare. Formerly a portion of the A4059; downgraded to a section of the B4275 around 1990. |
| A4225 | | | Ran from Porth to Trehafod, was the A4058. Downgraded to a portion of the B4278, but although there is evidence the A4225 number may still exist, it may be no more than a mapping error, as the current reference to it is on Google Earth. |
| A4226 | Bonvilston | Cardiff Airport | |
| ~~A4227~~ | Unused | | |
| A4228 | | | Described as a road in Pontypridd, but this is a typo for the A4223. |
| A4229 | Pyle | Porthcawl | |
| A4230 | Llansamlet | Aberdulais | |
| A4231 | Biglis | Pencoedtre | |
| A4232 | M4 J30 Cardiff East | M4 J33 Cardiff West | Cardiff Link Road (Peripheral Distribution Road) |
| A4233 | Tonyrefail | Aberdare | |
| A4234 | Adam Street, Cardiff | Queensgate Roundabout, Cardiff | Central Link Road of the Peripheral Distribution Road |
| ~~A4235~~ - ~~A4239~~ | Unused | | |
| A4240 | Penllergaer | Loughor | |
| A4241 | Port Talbot | Baglan | Port Talbot southern distributor road |
| A4242 | Carmarthen | Carmarthen | |
| A4243 | Carmarthen | Carmarthen | |
| A4244 | Brynrefail | Glasinfryn | Reclassified from parts of B4366 and B4547 |
| ~~A4245~~ - ~~A4250~~ | Unused | | |
| A4251 | Kings Langley | Near Tring | Largely the old route of the A41 |
| A4252 | West Bromwich | Smethwick | Part of the route was originally numbered B4168, A4168 and A4031. Renumbered A4252 in 2004 although as late as 2017 some signs showed A4168. |
| ~~A4253~~ | Unused | | |
| A4254 | Chilvers Coton | Horeston Grange | Nuneaton Eastern Relief Road |
| ~~A4255~~ | Unused | | |
| A4256 | Drayton | Daventry Reservoir | |
| ~~A4257~~ - ~~A4258~~ | Unused | | |
| A4259 | Swindon | Wanborough | |
| A4260 | Banbury | near Pear Tree, Oxford | Formerly part of A423 |
| ~~A4261~~ - ~~A4272~~ | Unused | | |
| A4273 | | | Listed as "Local Link in Coventry". Route is unknown. |
| ~~A4274~~ - ~~A4279~~ | Unused | | |
| A4280 | Bedford A428 | Bedford A421 | Largely the old route of the A428 |
| A4281 | A4046 in Victoria, Ebbw Vale | Ebbw Vale East and Ebbw Vale West junctions | One section was formerly a portion of the A465. |
| ~~A4282~~ - ~~A4288~~ | Unused | | |
| A4289 | Swindon | Swindon | |
| ~~A4290~~ - ~~A4299~~ | Unused | | |
| A4300 | Kettering | Kettering | |
| A4301 | Gloucester | Gloucester | |
| A4302 | Gloucester | Gloucester | |
| A4303 | A5 near Cross in Hand | M1 J20 | Lutterworth southern bypass; serves Magna Park distribution centre; dualled for entire length. Former portion of the A427. |
| A4304 | M1 J20 | Market Harborough | |
| ~~A4305~~ - ~~A4310~~ | Unused | | |
| A4311 | Swindon | Swindon | |
| A4312 | Swindon | Swindon | |
| A4313 | Swindon | Walcot | |
| ~~A4314~~ - ~~A4319~~ | Unused | | |
| A4320 | Arno's Vale | M32 J3 | |
| ~~A4321~~ - ~~A4360~~ | Unused | | |
| A4361 | Beckhampton | Swindon | Renumbered from the A361 in the 1970s, with an extra digit to encourage traffic to avoid Swindon. |
| ~~A4362~~ - ~~A4379~~ | Unused | | |
| A4380 | A41 Park Road | Oxford Street | Designated in 2018, when Baker Street and Gloucester Place became two-way roads. |
| ~~A4381~~ - ~~A4389~~ | Unused | | |
| A4390 | A3400 Birmingham Road, Stratford-upon-Avon | A422 Banbury Road, Bridge Town | Former A4134 (and B4534 before that). |
| ~~A4391~~ - ~~A4399~~ | Unused | | |
| A4400 | Lancaster Circus, Birmingham | Paradise Circus, Birmingham | Formerly used for the entire Birmingham Inner Ring Road, this is the designation for the ground level road where the A38 runs through tunnels. The western section is now the A38, the eastern section now B4100 and the remainder demolished. |
| ~~A4401~~ - ~~A4419~~ | Unused | | |
| A4420 | Hoobrook | Birchen Coppice | Silverwood Way |
| A4421 | Bicester | Finmere | |
| ~~A4422~~ - ~~A4439~~ | Unused | | |
| A4440 | Worcester | Worcester | |
| ~~A4441~~ - ~~A4443~~ | Unused | | |
| A4444 | Bilston | Moxley | Black Country New Road. Connects A463 and A41. Runs parallel to Walsall Canal. |
| ~~A4445~~ - ~~A4499~~ | Unused | | |
| A4500 | Northampton | Wellingborough | Formerly A45. Runs from M1 junction 16 to A509 Wellingborough ring road |
| A4501 | Northampton | Northampton | |
| ~~A4502~~ - ~~A4507~~ | Unused | | |
| A4508 | Unused | | Ran from A45 south of Billing to Kingsthorpe (numbered as a link between A45 and A508). Renumbered to A5076 in the 2000s because the road was in zone 5. |
| ~~A4509~~ | Unused | | |
| A4510 | M54 | i54 Business Park | Eastbound access to M54 or westbound access to i54 uses adjacent J2 (A449) slip roads. |
| ~~A4511~~ - ~~A4531~~ | Unused | | |
| A4532 | | | Ran from Malvern Link to Great Malvern; created in the 1960s when the A440 was decommissioned. The A4532 took over the westernmost section of the ex-A440 as well as the northernmost section of the B4208. Half of Pickersleigh Road returned to the B4208 (the other half is unclassified) and the remainder (the former A440) is now the B4211. |
| ~~A4533~~ - ~~A4534~~ | Unused | | |
| A4535 | Kidderminster | Kidderminster | |
| A4536 | Fernhill Heath | A38 | |
| ~~A4537~~ | Unused | | |
| A4538 | Spetchley | Martin Hussingtree | Originally Evesham to Martin Hussingtree; former B4084. The route between Spetchley and Evesham became a portion of the A44 in 2004. |
| A4539 | | | Appears on OS Landranger maps running from the A442 to the Priorslee Roundabout at the then-A5, A464 and B5061 via the old M54 J5. The section between the A442 and M54 may have had the A4539 number with the remainder up to the A464 as part of the A5 (this is possible because the number on the map is as long as the section mentioned), but no further maps showing the number have been found. |
| A4540 | Birmingham Ring Road | | The Middleway. The name stems from the road originally being designated as the Middle Ring Road. It is now the only one of Birmingham's Ring Road to be completely dual carriageway. |
| A4541 | | | Ran from Meole Brace to The Column, forming the start of the Shrewsbury eastern bypass. Renumbered to the A5112 except for a small section at the northern end that is now part of the A458. Whether or not the road was out-of-zone is debatable: while the road was on the wrong side of the A5 Shrewsbury bypass, it was on the correct side of the original A5. |
| ~~A4542~~ - ~~A4544~~ | Unused | | |
| A4545 | M42 J5A | Clock Interchange | This road opened in December 2024. Number chosen "because of its significance linking it with the A45 Clock Interchange which is part of the network already used by motorists" |
| ~~A4546~~ - ~~A4599~~ | Unused | | |
| A4600 | M69 J2 | Coventry | Formerly part of the A46. |
| A4601 | Cannock | Cannock | Former route of A460. |
| A4640 | M54 J4 | A518 | Former B5060, renumbered in 2008. |
| A4723 | | | Shown in a 1975 AA Touring Guide town plan for Birmingham on Harborne Lane in Selly Oak as headed for the "Ring Road (A4723)". As Harborne Lane is part of the A4040 (Birmingham Ring Road), the "A4723" is probably a typo for the A4123. |
| A4801 | | | Ran from Piccadilly Circus to Charing Cross Road in London via Coventry Street (may be a typo for A4201, but could be genuine). |
| A4810 | Newport SDR | M4 J23A | Classified A4810 in September 2013 when opened to the public |
| A4811 | Glendulais | Glen-Hafren | Former routing of A483 and A489 though Newtown. Designated in February 2019 when the Newtown bypass opened. |
| A4971 | Minffordd, Gwynedd | Porthmadog | Designated October 2011; formerly part of the A487. |
