= Culverhouse Cross =

Area in Cardiff / Vale of Glamorgan, Wales

Coordinates: 51.46566°N 3.27036°W

Culverhouse Cross: Welsh: Croes Cwrlwys
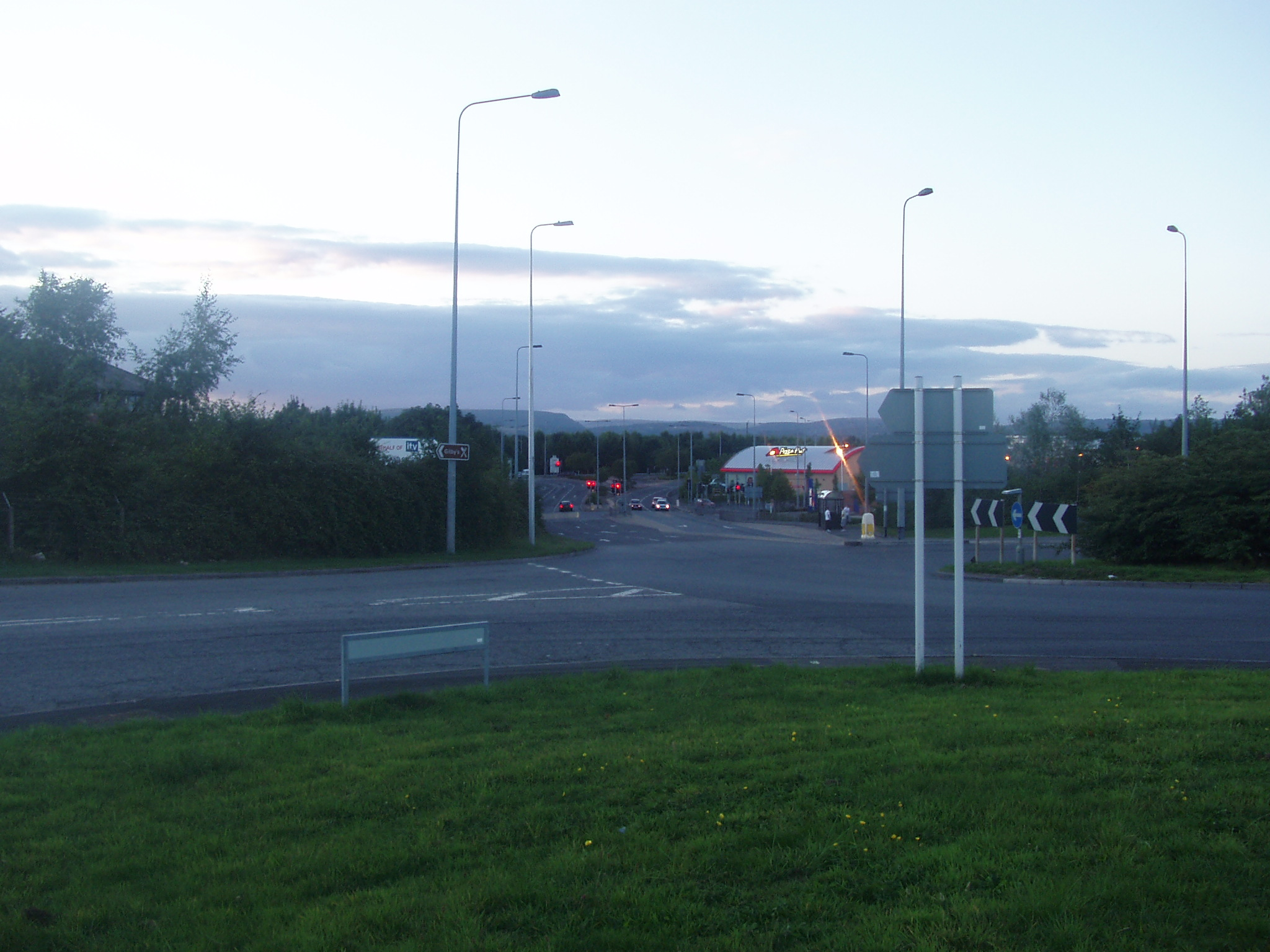
- View of Culverhouse Cross from the A4050 coming from Barry

- Location within the Vale of Glamorgan
- OS grid reference: ST118748
- Principal area: Vale of Glamorgan
- Preserved county: South Glamorgan
- Country: Wales
- Sovereign state: United Kingdom
- Post town: Vale of Glamorgan
- Postcode district: CF5
- Dialling code: 029
- Police: South Wales
- Fire: South Wales
- Ambulance: Welsh
- UK Parliament: Cardiff West
- Senedd Cymru – Welsh Parliament: Cardiff West

Culverhouse Cross (Welsh: Croes Cwrlwys) is a district straddling the boundary between Cardiff and the Vale of Glamorgan, Wales, in the community of Wenvoe.

The district is centred on a major traffic roundabout that links West Cardiff to the M4 motorway and is home to a number of different retail outlets, and formerly ITV Wales's headquarters.

== History ==
According to place-name etymologist Deric Meidrum John, there has been a crossroads at Culverhouse Cross for some centuries, originally at the intersection of the Cardiff to Cowbridge turnpike and the road between the parishes of St Fagans and Wenvoe. He states that a farmhouse by the name Culverhouse existed nearby and that the word Culver refers to a pigeon. The Welsh equivalent name Cwrlwys was apparently recorded in 1776. Research at British History Online shows that the word Culverhouse may also refer to a dovecot.

The Coedarhydyglyn estate, seat of numerous local prominent men from 1767 onwards, is located at the top of Tumble Hill above the crossroads.

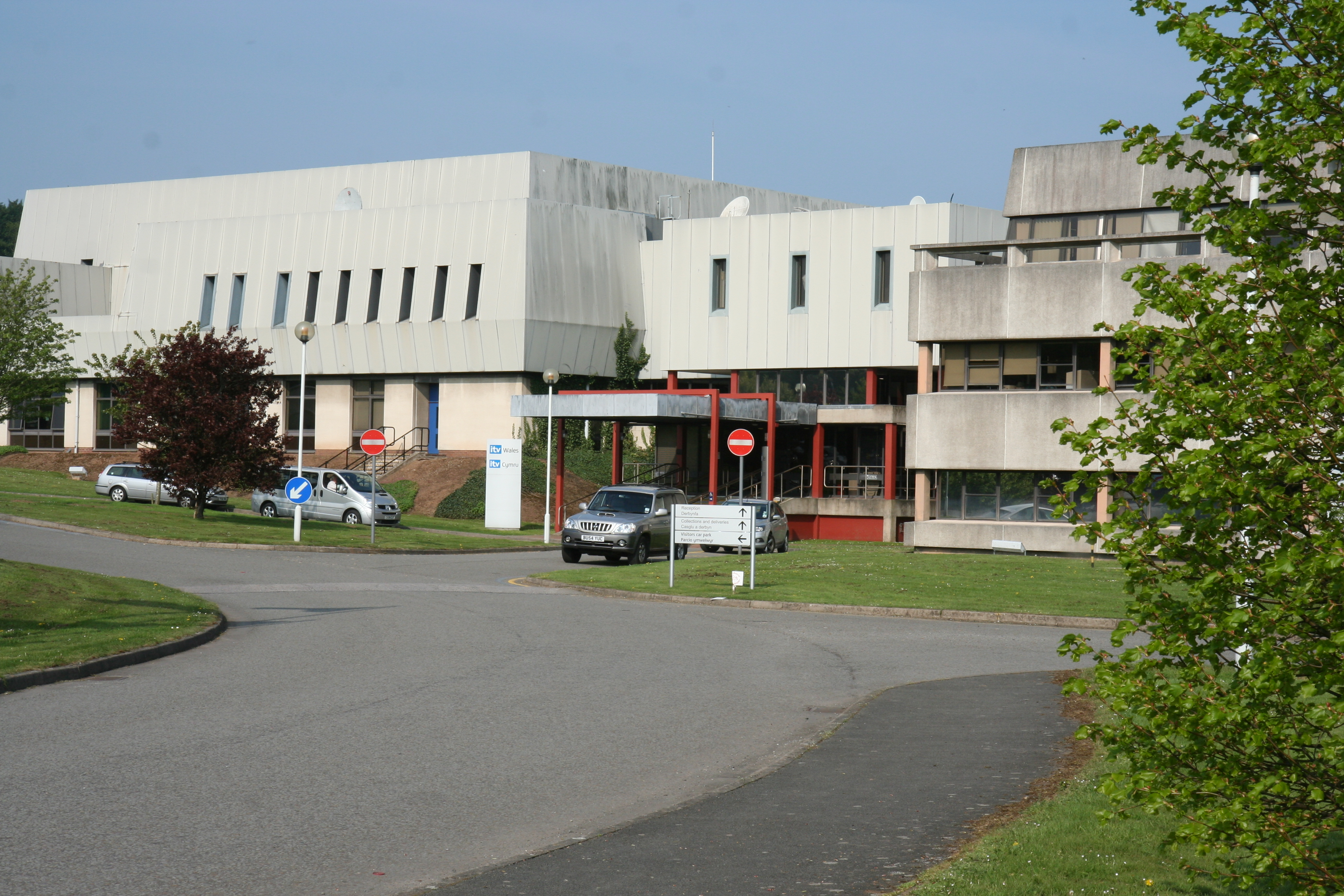
ITV Wales studios

Significant commercial and retail development of the area began in 1984 when HTV, the local commercial television contractor at that time, established television headquarters, studios and related facilities near the village of Wenvoe. Renamed ITV Wales, the company downsized and relocated to Cardiff Bay in 2014, and the entire Culverhouse Cross studio, technical and office complex was demolished in April 2015.

Tesco was the first store to be built in Culverhouse Cross in 1986, preceding a decade of rapid development in the suburb because of its accessible location. Demolition of the old Tesco superstore began in March 2007 and operated out of a temporary structure while a new Tesco Extra was built in its place. This opened on 22 October 2007.

== Retail parks ==
All of the district's retail parks are situated on or very close to the main roundabout.

Valegate Retail Park forms around the A48 westbound exit of the roundabout towards Cowbridge and Bridgend.

Brooklands Retail Park is situated between the A4232 southbound and the A4050 exits of the roundabout.

Wenvoe Retail Park forms around the A48 eastbound exit of the roundabout. There is a large B&Q store opposite.

== Roundabout exits ==
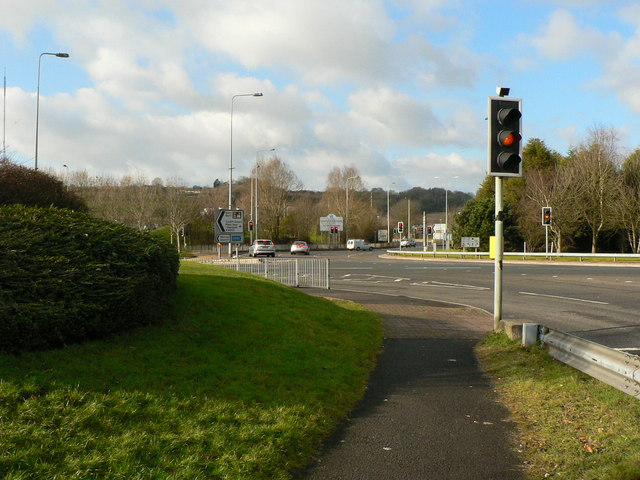
Roundabout junction where the A48 and A4232 join Culverhouse Cross

- A4232(S): Cardiff Centre and Penarth, Leckwith, Cardiff Bay, Cardiff International Sports Village and Cardiff City Stadium
- A4050 to Barry, Wenvoe, Dinas Powys and Cardiff International Airport
- A48(W) Vale of Glamorgan – St. Nicholas, Bonvilston, Cowbridge – and Bridgend, Dyffryn Gardens and The Downs
- A4232(N) M4 Junction 33 – Bridgend, Port Talbot, Swansea, Newport, Bristol and London
- A48(E) Cardiff West, Ely, Canton, Caerau, St. Fagans

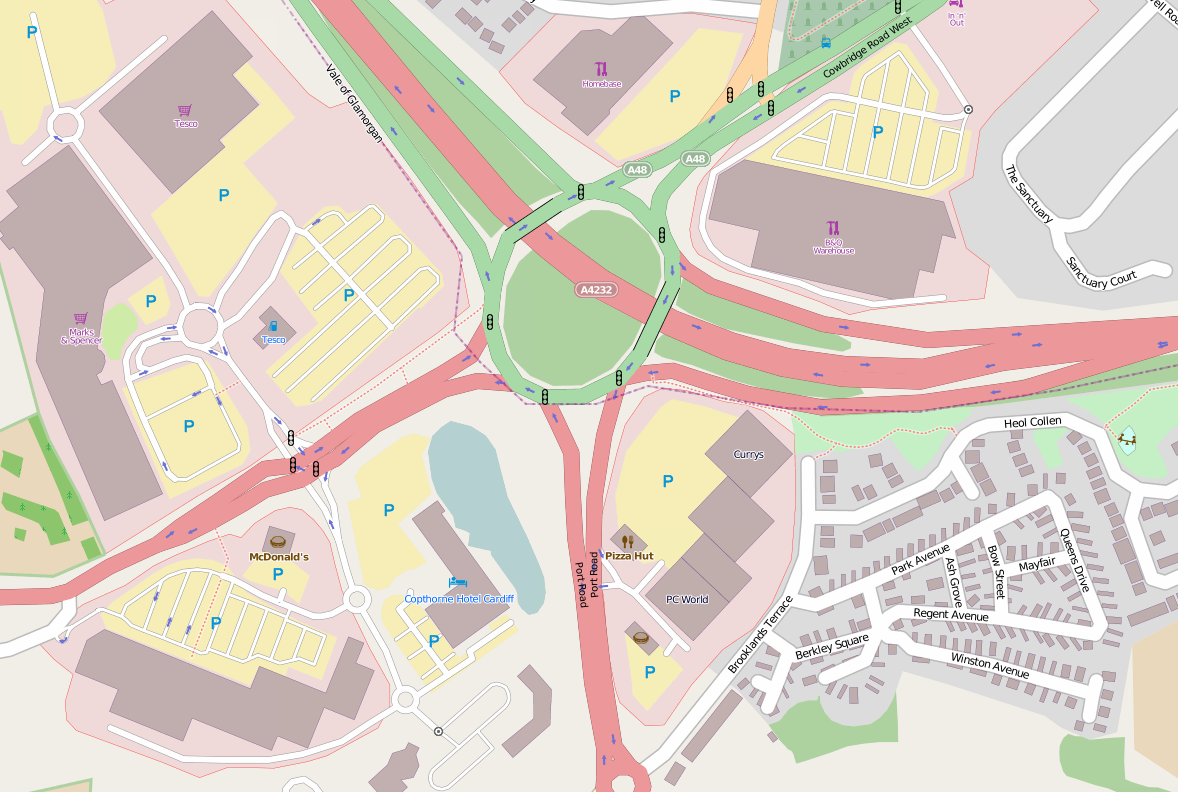
Map of Culverhouse Cross

== Public transport ==
Culverhouse Cross is served by Cardiff Bus and First Cymru.

- Service 96 (provided by the Vale of Glamorgan Council) serves Cardiff City Centre and Barry
- Service X2 (FirstBus) goes to Cowbridge and Bridgend
- The T9 express service between Cardiff city centre, Cardiff Bay and Cardiff Airport passes through Culverhouse Cross, but does not make scheduled stops

The nearest railway station, although not particularly close, is Waun-Gron Park in Fairwater. The bus services from Culverhouse Cross, however, provide a direct service to Cardiff Central railway station.
