= A4240 road =

Road in Swansea

Coordinates: 51.66904°N 4.03799°W

A4240

- A4240 Gorseinon Road looking west

Major junctions
- East end: A484 in Loughor
- A484; A48; A483; M4
- West end: M4 in Penllergaer

Location
- Country: United Kingdom
- Constituent country: Wales

Road network
- Roads in the United Kingdom; Motorways; A and B road zones
← A4234	→ A4241

The A4240 is a main road in Gorseinon, Swansea, Wales.

== Route ==
The A4240 begins at the roundabout at the Loughor side of the Loughor bridge. The road heads east through Loughor, then onwards through Gorseinon, where it forms the east–west main road intersecting with the B4296 in central Gorseinon. The A4240 then continues through the Garngoch Industrial Estate and then through Penllergaer after which it continues along a single carriageway shared with the A48 until it reaches the roundabout which forms Junction 47 with the M4 motorway.
