= A474 road =

Road in south Wales

Coordinates: 51.72235°N 3.85633°W

A474

Route information
- Part of E40

Major junctions
- Southeast end: Briton Ferry
- A48 A465 A4230 A4067 A4069 A483
- Northwest end: Ammanford

Location
- Country: United Kingdom
- Constituent country: Wales
- Primary destinations: Neath

Road network
- Roads in the United Kingdom; Motorways; A and B road zones
← A473	→ A475

The A474 is a suburban main route in south Wales.

== Route ==
Settlements served by the A474 include:

- Briton Ferry
- Neath
- Neath Abbey
- Cadoxton
- Rhyddings
- Fforest Goch
- Rhos
- Gellinudd
- Pontardawe
- Gelligron
- Rhydyfro
- Cwmgors
- Gwaun-Cae-Gurwen
- Glanamman
- Ammanford
