= A4234 road =

Road in Wales

Coordinates: 51.4730°N 3.1621°W

A4234

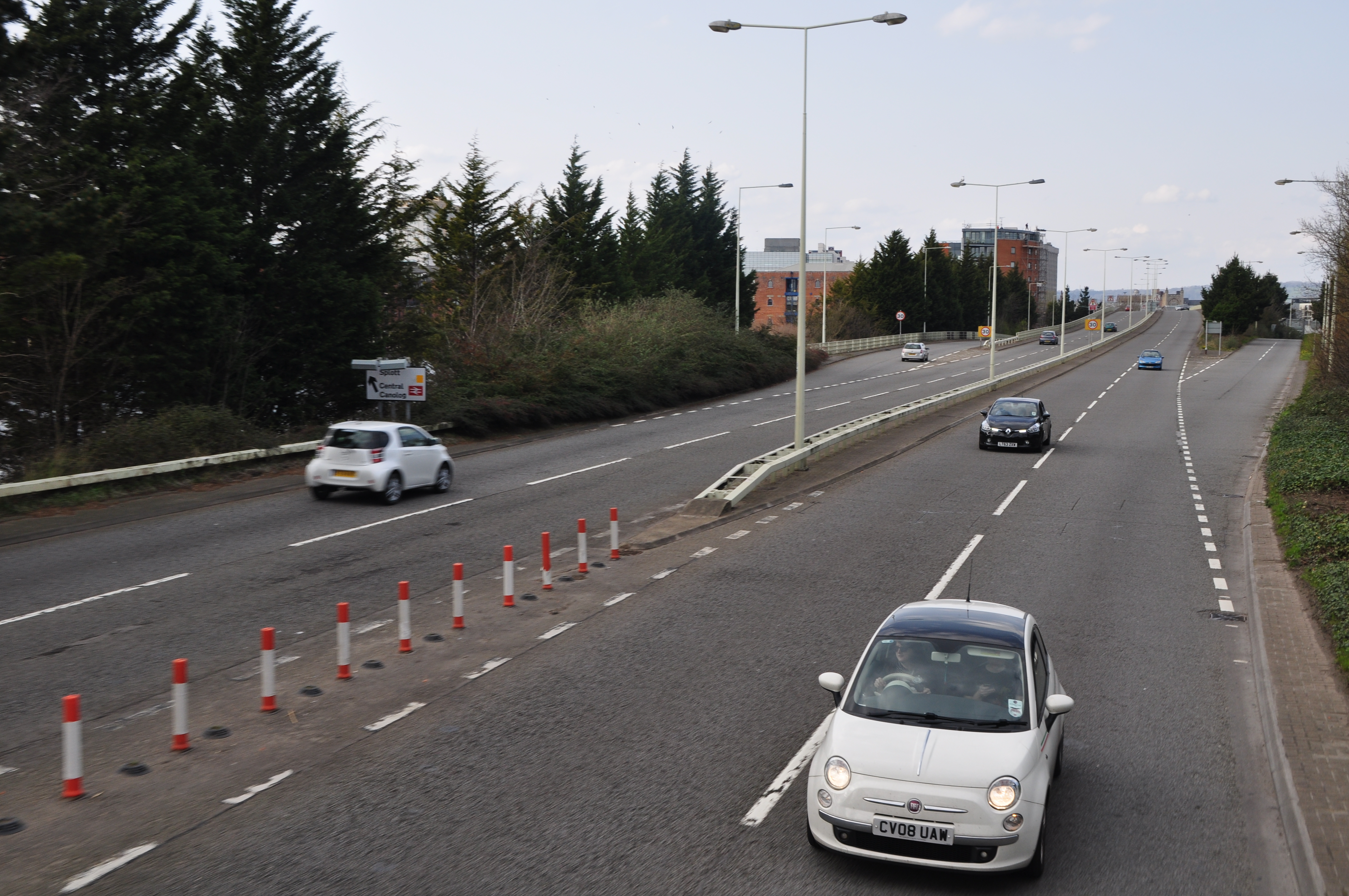
- Junction of Splott slip road looking north

Route information
- History: Construction completed 1989

Major junctions
- South end: A4232
- A4232 A4160
- North end: A4160

Location
- Country: United Kingdom
- Constituent country: Wales
- Primary destinations: Cardiff

Road network
- Roads in the United Kingdom; Motorways; A and B road zones
← A4233	→ A4240

The A4234, also known as the Central Link Road, is a spur off the A4232 in Cardiff, the capital of Wales. It links the southern part of Cardiff city centre to the motorway network. The length of the A4234 is just 0.9 miles (1.4 km) and is entirely a two lane dual carriageway with clearway restrictions. The road was opened on 16 February 1989.

== Junctions ==
A4234
Southbound exits	Junction	Northbound exits
Access only	Adam Street junction	A4160 road, City centre, Adamsdown
Access only	Splott slip road	Splott
Atlantic Wharf	Atlantic Wharf roundabout	City centre
A4232	Queen's Gate roundabout	City centre

== See also ==
- Transport in Cardiff
