= Pencoedtre =

Suburb in Barry, Vale of Glamorgan, Wales

- District of Barry
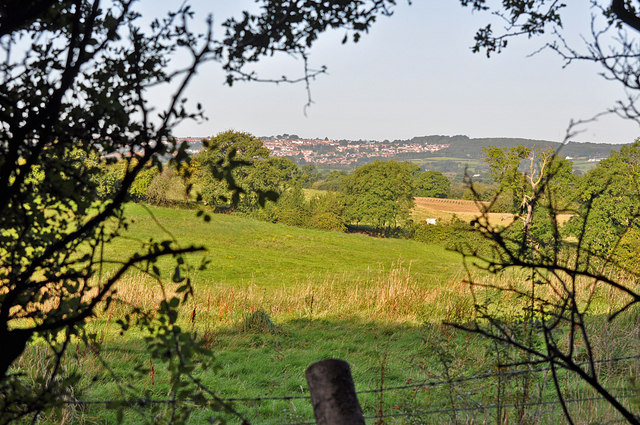
- Pencoedtre in the distance viewed from Cosmeston.

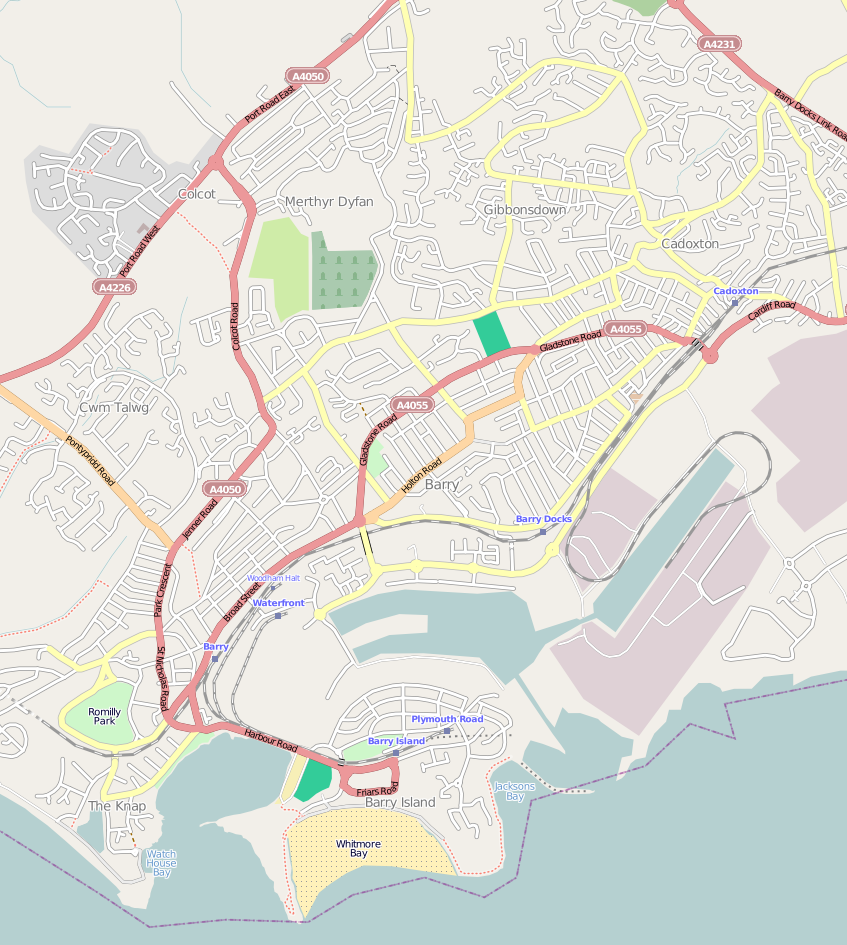
- Location in Barry
- Coordinates: 51°25′30″N 3°15′31″W
- Country: United Kingdom
- Region: Wales
- County: Vale of Glamorgan
- Town: Barry
- Time zone: UTC+0 (GMT)

Pencoedtre or Pencoetre, also known as Pencoedtre Village, is a northeastern suburb of Barry in the Vale of Glamorgan, Wales. It borders Gibbonsdown to the southwest and Cadoxton to the south. It has developed from a small farming hamlet into an extensive housing estate in recent years. Pencoedtre Wood is one of the largest areas of woodland in the town, and is a Site of Special Scientific Interest. Pencoedtre Park is located between Pencoedtre and Gibbonsdown.

== History ==
Pencoedtre has been referred to as "Penchoterich" in some historical sources. A survey conducted in 1965 found that banks and ditches in the area revealed the possibility that a hill fort had once been located in the area, but no trace has been found. An area to the west of Pencoedtre Wood was known historically as "Cross Greenallt" (an odd mixture of Welsh and English which could mean Greenwood Cross).

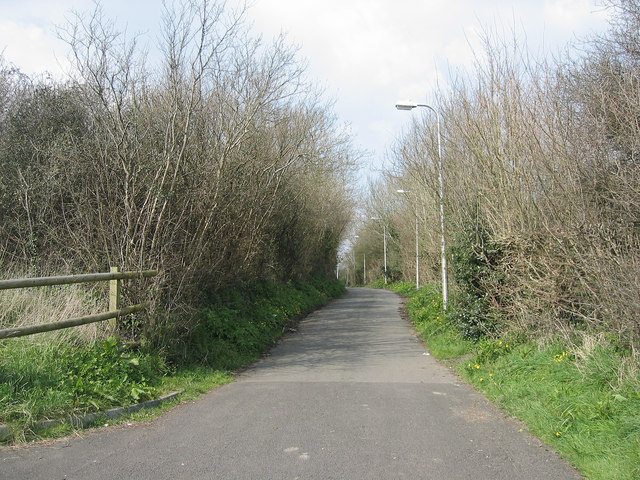
Pencoedtre Lane in 2007 before development.

Pencoedtre was originally a farming hamlet of two farms in the Parish of St. Andrews Major, in the commote known as the Hundred of Dinas Powys. Excavations in 1965 and 1966 by G. Dowdell found the remains of a large medieval house, measuring 23.5 metres by 11.1 metres. The house, given its size, was probably the seat of an Adam de Pencoteri. The floor was metalled, and the south end was supported on a platform of stone rubble. Several items were found dated to the 13-14th century, including a schist hone, a bronze pendant, a poppy-headed pin, iron nails and horseshoes. Seven drystone buildings and the remain of post-medieval houses were also unearthed.

By the mid-19th century, Pencoedtre had just four households and 28 inhabitants. Robert Jenner owned Pencoedtre in the early 19th century, and leased Pencoedtre Farm to Howell Thomas in 1810. At this time Pencoedtre had an area of 150 acres (60 ha), 130 acres (50 ha) of which was classed as being in Merthyr Dyfan. A Daniel Miles was documented to have owned a farm in Pencoedtre by the mid 19th century.

A service reservoir in Pencoedtre with a capacity of approximately 1 million gallons (4,500 m^{3}) was established in around 1890. In 1903, the urban district council borrowed £1,000 for the purchase of allotment grounds at Pencoedtre. Currently the Pencoedtre Farm is owned by the Jenkins family, and Woodfield Farm by the Curtis family.

The area has undergone one of the largest housing developments in the county since the 1990s in stages, growing from the edges of Gibbonsdown and from the Lidl supermarket at the roundabout on the A4231 road (Barry Docks Link Road). Barratt Homes proposed to the Vale of Glamorgan Council to build 13 houses (31 homes eventually) at Pencoedtre in 2002, known as Larksfield. In the most recent development, Barratt-Wimpey Homes has extended the estate to reach the A4050 Barry-Wenvoe road on a 3.4 hectare (9 acre) plot of land which was formerly farmland, reaching just to the east of Bryn Hafren Comprehensive School. The planning permission was granted in 2009 after months of debate by councillors, due to the fact that Pencoedtre Wood is classified as a Site of Special Scientific Interest. A business park had originally been proposed at the site but was rejected due to the sensitivity of the protected woodland. In 2008 the Welsh Assembly also allocated £576,000 to road resurfacing and improvement in the area along the A4050, which as of 2012 was still ongoing.

On 25 May 2011, a new residents’ association of Pencoedtre met the Pencoedtre Village Action Group, facilitated by MP Alun Cairns at St Richard Gwyn School.

== Pencoedtre Wood ==
Pencoedtre Wood, a thick ancient woodland immediately to the northeast of the housing estate between Barry and Wenvoe, is classified as a Site of Special Scientific Interest. Scientific studies of the woodland have revealed that the area is biologically rich with plants, insects and animals. Pencoedtre is valued as a "remnant of the great forests which once cloaked much of Wales." The woodland is managed by the Forestry Commission on behalf of the Welsh Assembly. In 2006 it was reported that the Forestry Commission advocated cutting down much of the woodland for housing, causing a dilemma for the Assembly. 23 acres (9 ha) of woodland would have been destroyed and 15 more (6 ha) degraded to make way for housing. Plaid Cymru councillors fought to save the woodland from the housing development, resulting in a 25-metre buffer zone being created around it to provide "sufficient distance between the woodland and houses" that "will ensure that noise and light will not impact on any wildlife in the wood."
