= City Bridge =

Bridge in Newport, South Wales

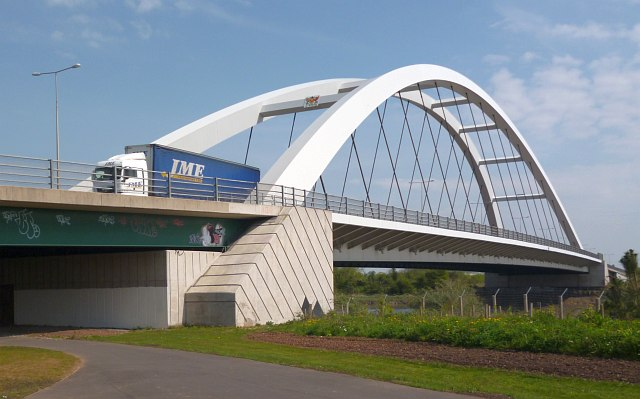
- The City Bridge looking east
- Coordinates: 51°34′37″N 2°58′27″W
- Carries: Motor vehicles, cyclists and pedestrians
- Crosses: River Usk
- Locale: Newport
- Official name: City Bridge
- Maintained by: Morgan Vinci Ltd.

Characteristics
- Design: Tied arch bridge
- Total length: 650 feet (200 m)
- Width: Dual two-lane carriageway, two cycle/footpaths
- Longest span: 613 1/2 feet (187.0 m)

History
- Opened: 17 November 2004

Location
- Interactive map of City Bridge

City Bridge is a crossing of the River Usk, for motor vehicles, cyclists and pedestrians, in the city of Newport, South Wales. It was opened in 2004 as part of the construction/re-generation of the Southern Distributor Road/A48 in Newport.

The bridge is the second most-southerly crossing of the River Usk in Newport, lying north of Newport Transporter Bridge.

== Design ==
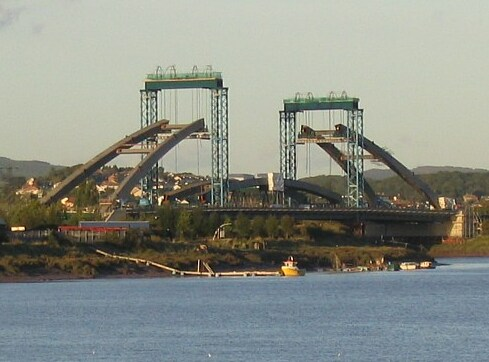
The City Bridge under construction

The bridge is a bow-string arch design, 650 ft (200 m) long and forms part of the city's Southern Distributor Road (SDR). On completion of the SDR, the A48 road was diverted over the new bridge, making it the preferred route for through traffic.

Between the two top chord pillars the west-bound carriageway of the bridge bears a large emblem of the Arms of Newport City Council.

== Recognition ==
In 2005 the bridge was recognised by the British Constructional Steelwork Association's Structural Steel Design Awards. The judges said of the bridge: "The Usk crossing symbolises the best in British bridge engineering. It combines an elegant design, high quality fabrication and innovative construction. Newport has gained not only another much-needed river crossing, but has gained an elegant steel structure in the process."

== See also ==
- List of bridges in Wales
