= A4055 road =

Road in Wales

Coordinates: 51°26′55″N 3°11′16″W

A4055

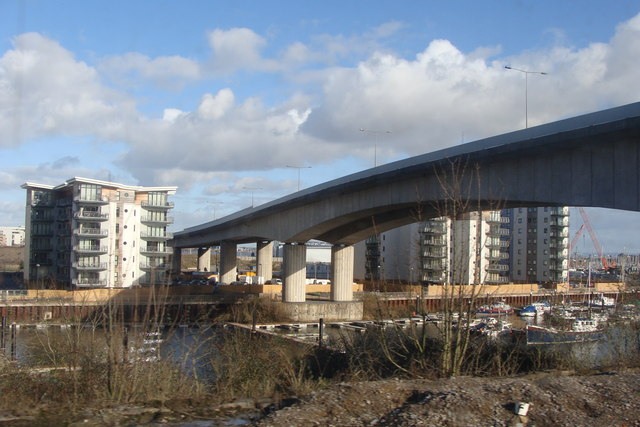
- Cogan Spur

Major junctions
- East end: Cardiff Bay
- A4232 A4160 A4231 A4050
- West end: Barry Island

Location
- Country: United Kingdom
- Constituent country: Wales
- Primary destinations: Cardiff

Road network
- Roads in the United Kingdom; Motorways; A and B road zones
← A4054	→ A4058

The A4055 is the main road link between Cardiff Bay and Barry in Wales.

== History ==
=== Dinas Powys Bypass ===
The road goes through the village of Dinas Powys and there has been a call for a by-pass due to the volume of traffic from Barry to and from Cardiff. However the Vale of Glamorgan Council confirmed in June 2007 that the by-pass would have to be funded by the Welsh Assembly Government (WAG).

=== 1988 extension ===
The road was extended in 1988 from the junction of the A4160 to the Ferry Road Interchange of the A4232, this is called the Cogan Spur and as such it is also a spur road off the A4232.

== Route ==
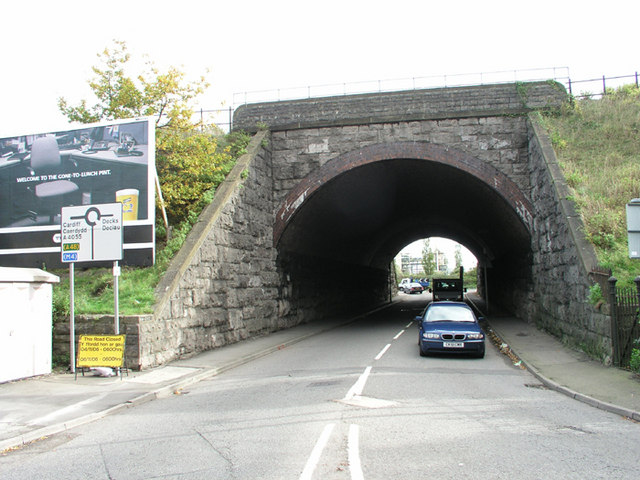
Weston Square Bridge, Barry

The road starts from the Cardiff International Sports Village at the Ferry Road Interchange (A4232), then along the Cogan Spur until the junction of Barons Court. From there it goes through Llandough and Dinas Powys. The road then enters the Barry district of Palmerstown along Cardiff Road and goes into Weston Square, Gladstone Road, Broad Street, Harbour Road and finally Friars Road in Barry Island.

== See also ==
- Transport in Cardiff
- Transport in Wales
