= A4042 road =

Trunk road in Wales

Coordinates: 51.71809°N 2.99137°W

A4042

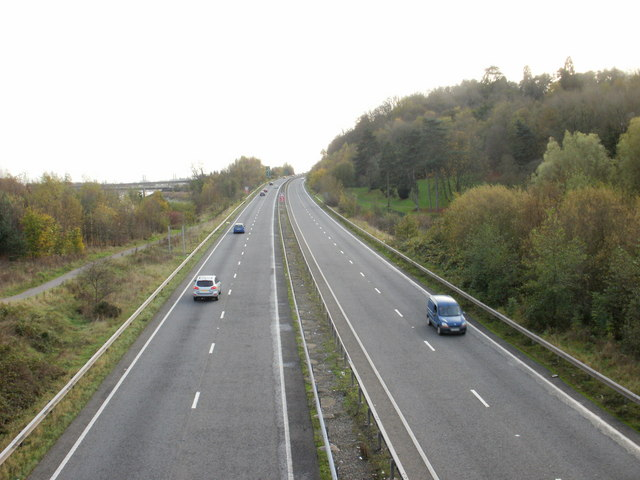

Major junctions
- North end: Abergavenny
- A40 A465 A472 A4051 M4 J25a; A48
- South end: Newport

Location
- Country: United Kingdom
- Primary destinations: Cwmbrân

Road network
- Roads in the United Kingdom; Motorways; A and B road zones
← A4041	→ A4043

The A4042 is a trunk road that runs from Abergavenny to Newport in south Wales.

== Route ==
Starting at the junction of the A40 and A465 south of Abergavenny, the A4042 travels south towards Little Mill north of Pontypool. This section is a single carriageway and is winding and undulating. From Little Mill onwards the road is dual carriageway, bypassing Pontypool and Cwmbran before crossing the city boundary into Newport. The road has a junction (25A) with the M4 motorway and south from there loses its primary status and becomes an urban road. The first section of which, Heidenheim Drive (named after one of Newport's twin towns), is an elevated roadway through the Crindau district. The road then becomes the Kingsway that passes through Newport city centre, and continues on as Usk Way until its junction with the A48 Southern Distributor Road to the south of Newport.

== Junctions ==
A4042
Northbound exits	Junction	Southbound exits
Merthyr Tydfil, Hereford A465; Abergavenny, Brecon, Monmouth A40	Ysbytty Fields Roundabout	Start of A4042
Llanfoist B4269	Llanellen Junction	Llanfoist B4269
Usk A472	Little Mill Junction	Usk, Little Mill A472
Mamhilad	Mamhilad Roundabout	Mamhilad
New Inn	New Inn Roundabout	New Inn
Pontypool A472 (A4043)	Pontymoile Roundabout	Pontypool A472 (A4043)
Cwmbran A4051; New Inn	Craig-y- Felin	New Inn; Cwmbran A4051
Croesyceiliog	Croesyceiliog Roundabout	Croesyceiliog
Croesyceiliog; Caerleon B4236	Turnpike Roundabout	Caerleon B4236
Llantarnam; Cwmbran	Crown Roundabout	Llantarnam; Cwmbran
Cwmbran A4051	Croes-y-Mwyalch	Cardiff A4051 (M4 (W))
Start of A4042	Grove Park	London, Chepstow A4042 (M4 (E))
A4042
Northbound exits	Junction / Interchange	Southbound exits
London, Chepstow A4042 (M4 (E)); Caerleon B4596	Grove Park	Start of A4042
Cardiff A4051 (M4 (W))	Harlequin	Cardiff A4051 (M4 (W)); City Centre
Civic Centre B4591; Exit only	Old Green Interchange	Access only
Cattle market Old Town Docks	Octopus Bridge	Old Town Docks; Superstore
Start of A4042	Old Town Dock	(M4 (E)), Pilgwenlly, Docks, (M4 (W)) A48
1.000 mi = 1.609 km; 1.000 km = 0.621 mi: Incomplete access

== See also ==
- Trunk roads in Wales
