= A48 road =

Road in Great Britain

Coordinates: 51.45989°N 3.37263°W

A48

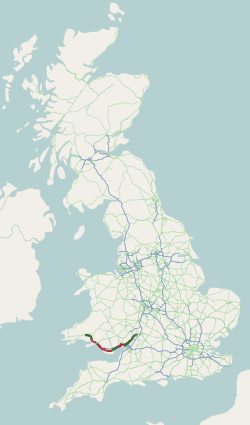

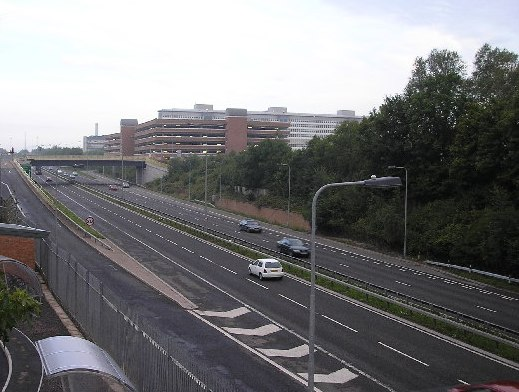
- The A48 (Eastern Avenue, in Cardiff near the University Hospital of Wales)

Route information
- Part of
- Maintained by English local authorities and South Wales Trunk Road Agent
- Length: 119.7 mi (192.6 km)

Major junctions
- West end: A484 near Carmarthen

- M4 / A483 near Llanedi M4 near Birchgrove A470 in Cardiff A48(M) in St Mellons M4 / A449 near Langstone A466 in Chepstow
- East end: A40 in Highnam

Location
- Country: United Kingdom
- Counties: Wales: Carmarthenshire, Swansea, Neath Port Talbot, Bridgend, Vale of Glamorgan, Cardiff, Newport, Monmouthshire; England: Gloucestershire
- Primary destinations: Chepstow, Newport, Cardiff, Bridgend, Port Talbot, Neath, Swansea, Carmarthen

Road network
- Roads in the United Kingdom; Motorways; A and B road zones
← A47	→ A49

The A48 is a road in Great Britain running from the A40 at Highnam, 3 miles (4.8 km) west of Gloucester, England, to the A40 at Carmarthen, Wales. Before the Severn Bridge opened on 8 September 1966, it was a major route between England and South Wales. For most of its route, it runs almost parallel to the M4 motorway. During times of high winds at the Severn Bridge, the A48 is used as part of the diversion route and is still marked as a Holiday Route.

From Gloucester, the A48 runs through the villages of Minsterworth, Westbury-on-Severn, connects to a link road to Cinderford in the Forest of Dean then through Newnham, Blakeney and since 1995, bypassing Lydney on the west bank of the River Severn. It crosses the England–Wales border at Chepstow and continues westwards close to the South Wales coast passing Newport, Cardiff, Cowbridge, Bridgend, Pyle, Port Talbot, Neath and Swansea, before terminating at the junction with the A40 near the centre of Carmarthen.

Parts of the road, along with other roads, form the London–Fishguard and Swansea–Manchester trunk roads, when they were designated in 1937.

== Route ==
=== Highnam to Cardiff ===
The A48 from Highnam to Newport runs adjacent to the River Severn. After running through a series of villages, it crosses the England–Wales border at Chepstow. The section between Higham and Chepstow is still a primary route of some importance for the Forest of Dean. From the M4 Motorway at J15 near Swindon, traffic is directed for Wales if it is over the Severn Bridge weight limit of 44 tonnes. Traffic is directed onto the A419, then onto the A417 after Cirencester, and at Gloucester, onto the A40. This road has some speed cameras, as there have previously been incidents here, and have been erected to prevent them from happening again. During busy periods, such as the Severn Bore, this road may become busy with parked cars near the river's edge. Apart from morning and evening rush hours, the road is generally quite empty and free running, with no heavy traffic reports. The road also runs next to the Forest of Dean. The woods may be viewed from the roadside, as may the hills of the Dean. There is a level crossing in Lydney. Until Chepstow, there is a height limit under the low railway bridges. Tall vehicles are directed to Newport on the A40. For some parts of this route, short distance dual carriageways occur, especially on steep hills. At Chepstow, the road links Gloucestershire with Monmouthshire. The road runs through Chepstow. There is access to the Forest of Dean in Chepstow. At the end of the road in Chepstow (at the roundabout), the Primary Route ends here, and it meets the A466, a road that provides access to the Wye Valley and to the M48 motorway, originally the M4. Access to the M4 is available on this road. The A48 becomes a secondary route here, and continues bypassing Caldicot, Caerwent and Langstone.

The A48 then continues to M4 junction 24, from which point it is also known as the Southern Distributor Road, which is entirely a dual carriageway with two lanes in each direction around the southern end of Newport until M4 junction 28. From junction 28 it remains a dual carriageway until just after the Celtic Way roundabout where it becomes a single carriageway with four lanes past Castleton, and then merges with the junction 29A of the A48(M) motorway at St Mellons, where it again becomes a dual carriageway with two lanes in each direction, where it is known as the Eastern Avenue until the Gabalfa Interchange, where it is known as the Western Avenue and is largely a single carriageway with four lanes until Culverhouse Cross interchange.

=== Cardiff to Carmarthen ===
From the Culverhouse Cross interchange on the western border of Cardiff the road is mostly a single carriageway with two lanes until Cowbridge, where it becomes the Cowbridge Bypass which is a dual carriageway, until again it becomes a single carriageway with two lanes until Bridgend when it is a dual carriageway again. From Bridgend it becomes a single carriageway, until Port Talbot where it is a dual carriageway, and originally known as the A48(M) (Port Talbot Bypass) until the M4 was extended. The A48 then ends on the western end of the Briton Ferry Bridge at junction 42 of the M4 and starts again at junction 44 where again it is a single carriageway until the end of the M4 at junction 49 where it becomes a dual carriageway and forms part of the main trunk road between Pont Abraham Services to Carmarthen where the A48 ends.

== Junction list ==
County	Location	mi	km	Destinations	Notes
Carmarthenshire	Llangunnor	0.0	0.0	A40 / A484 – Fishguard, St Clears, Llandeilo, Llanelli	Western terminus
Carmarthenshire	Llangunnor	7.2	11.6	B4310 – Nantgaredig	Junction
Carmarthenshire	Cross Hands	10.9	17.5	A476 (Llandeilo Road) – Village centre, Llanelli, Llandeilo, Tumble, Gorslas	
Carmarthenshire	Cross Hands	11.4– 11.8	18.3– 19.0	Cross Hands, Cwmgwili	Junction; Cwmgwili signed westbound only
Carmarthenshire	Llannon– Llanedi boundary	14.7	23.7	M4 east – Cardiff, Llanelli, Swansea A483 north – Ammanford, Llandeilo	Llanelli and Ammanford signed eastbound only; western terminus of M4; southern terminus of A483
Carmarthenshire	Llanedi	17.3	27.8	A4138 west (Iscoed Road) to M4 – Llanelli, Hendy	Eastern terminus of A4138
Swansea	Penllergaer	21.3	34.3	A4240 west (Gorseinon Road) / Swansea Road – Gorseinon, Loughor	Eastern terminus of A4240
Swansea	Penllergaer	21.6– 21.9	34.8– 35.2	M4 – Cardiff, Neath, Llanelli, Carmarthen A483 south – Swansea (W)	M4 junction 47; northern terminus of A483
Swansea	Llangyfelach	23.7	38.1	M4 – Llanelli, Carmarthen	M4 junction 46
Swansea	Morriston	25.6	41.2	A4067 to M4 – Swansea City Centre, Pontardawe, Landore, Swansea Vale, Clydach	Landore signed eastbound only
Swansea	Llansamlet	26.4	42.5	A4217 south (Samlet Road) to A4067 – Trallwn, St Thomas	Northern terminus of A4217
Swansea	Llansamlet– Birchgrove boundary	27.4	44.1	M4 west – Carmarthen, Swansea Vale A4230 east / B4290 – Skewen, Birchgrove, Clydach	Western terminus of M4 concurrency; Swansea Vale signed eastbound only; A4230, B4290 and destinations signed westbound only; M4 junction 44
Neath Port Talbot	Coedffranc	28.9– 29.6	46.5– 47.6	A465 east – Neath, Merthyr Tydfil	Western terminus of A465; M4 junction 43
Neath Port Talbot	Coedffranc	29.9	48.1	M4 east – Cardiff, Port Talbot	Eastbound exit and westbound entrance; eastern terminus of M4 concurrency; M4 junction 42
Neath Port Talbot	Coedffranc	30.5	49.1	A483 south (Fabian Way) – Swansea	Northern terminus of A483
Neath Port Talbot	Briton Ferry	31.2	50.2	A474 north-west (Neath Road) / Old Road / Brunel Way – Briton Ferry	Southern terminus of A474
Neath Port Talbot	Baglan	32.3	52.0	M4 east – Cardiff A4241 southeast – Aberavon, Port Talbot	Port Talbot signed eastbound only; northwestern terminus of A4241
Neath Port Talbot	Port Talbot	35.0	56.3	A4107 east (Abbey Road) to M4 – Cymer, Goytre	Western terminus of A4107
Neath Port Talbot	Margam	36.8	59.2	M4 west – Swansea	Access only from A48 to M4 west
Neath Port Talbot	Margam	37.1	59.7	A4241 northwest (Harbour Way) – Port Talbot	Southeastern terminus of A4241
Neath Port Talbot	Margam	37.5	60.4	M4 east – Cardiff, Bridgend	Remaining access to/from M4
Neath Port Talbot	North Cornelly	41.2	66.3	A4229 south / To B4283 to M4 – Porthcawl, North Cornelly, Port Talbot	Port Talbot signed westbound only; northern terminus of A4229
Bridgend	Laleston– Merthyr Mawr boundary	44.2	71.1	A473 northeast / A4063 / A4061 – Laleston, Bridgend, Maesteg, Blackmill	To A4063, A4061, Maesteg and Blackmill signed eastbound only; southwestern terminus of A473
Bridgend	Bridgend– Coychurch Lower boundary	47.3	76.1	A473 (Cowbridge Road / Waterton Road) to M4 / A4061 / A4063 – Bridgend, Llantrisant, Cardiff, Bryncethin, Maesteg	
Vale of Glamorgan	Penllyn– Cowbridge boundary	52.2– 52.5	84.0– 84.5	A4222 north – Cowbridge, Llantwit Major, Llantrisant	Junction; no westbound exit
Vale of Glamorgan	Cowbridge	54.1	87.1	A4222 north – Cowbridge, Llantrisant	Junction; westbound exit and eastbound entrance
Vale of Glamorgan	St Nicholas and Bonvilston	58.0	93.3	A4226 south (Five Mile Lane) – Cardiff Airport, Barry, Moulton	Northern terminus of A4226
Cardiff	Ely	60.9	98.0	A4232 to M4 / A4160 – Bridgend, Newport, Cardiff Centre, Penarth A4050 south – Berry	Junction on A4232; northern terminus of A4050
Cardiff	Canton– Fairwater boundary	63.2	101.7	A4161 east (Cowbridge Road East) – City centre	Western terminus of A4161
Cardiff	Llandaff North– Whitchurch– Heath–Gabalfa boundary	65.0– 65.4	104.6– 105.3	A470 to M4 – City centre	Junction
Cardiff	Heath– Gabalfa boundary	65.6– 65.8	105.6– 105.9	All Nations Centre	Junction; westbound exit and eastbound entrance
Cardiff	Penylan– Llanedeyrn boundary	67.5– 67.9	108.6– 109.3	A4232 west – Cardiff (E), Llanedeyrn	Junction; A4232 and Cardiff signed westbound only, Llanedeyrn eastbound only; western terminus of A4232 concurrency
Cardiff	Pentwyn	68.5– 68.9	110.2– 110.9	Pentwyn	Junction
Cardiff	Pontprennau– Old St Mellons boundary	69.2– 69.5	111.4– 111.8	A4232 east to M4 – Bridgend, Pontprennau	Junction; eastern terminus of A4232 concurrency
Cardiff	Old St Mellons	70.3	113.1	A48(M) northeast to M4 east – Newport	Junction; eastbound exit and westbound entrance; southwestern terminus of A48(M)
Newport	Gaer– Coedkernew boundary	74.6– 74.8	120.1– 120.4	M4 – London, Cardiff A467 north (Forge Road) – Brynmawr	Southern terminus of A467; M4 junction 28
Newport	Pillgwenlly	77.5	124.7	A4042 north (Usk Way) – Pillgwenlly (N), City centre, Cwmbran	Southern terminus of A4042
Newport	Pillgwenlly– Liswerry boundary	77.6– 77.9	124.9– 125.4	City Bridge over River Usk	
Newport	Liswerry	78.8	126.8	A4810 east (Queensway Meadows) / Lee Way – Magor, Glan Llyn	Western terminus of A4810
Newport	Ringland– Caerleon– Langstone– Llanwern boundary	81.3	130.8	M4 – Cardiff, London, Chepstow A449 north to M50 / M5 – The Midlands, Monmouth; B4237 (Chepstow Road) – Newport	Southern terminus of A449; M4 junction 24
Monmouthshire	Chepstow	93.1	149.8	A466 (Wye Valley Link Road) / Fair View to M48 – Bristol, Newport, Monmouth, Cardiff	Cardiff signed westbound only
Monmouthshire– Gloucestershire boundary	Chepstow– Tutshill boundary	94.0– 94.2	151.3– 151.6	River Wye; Wales–England boundary	
Gloucestershire	Highnam	119.7	192.6	A40 to B4215 – Ross-on-Wye, Gloucester, Newent, Mitcheldean, Huntley, Churcham, Over, Highnam	Eastern terminus
1.000 mi = 1.609 km; 1.000 km = 0.621 mi: Concurrency terminus; Incomplete access

== History of the road number ==
The original (1923) route of the A48 was Worcester to Carmarthen via Malvern, Ledbury, Ross-on-Wye, Monmouth, Newport, Cardiff, Bridgend, Neath and Llanelli. In 1935 it was rerouted east of Newport, replacing the A437 between Newport and Gloucester. The road from Worcester to Newport became part of the A449, apart from the section between Ross and Monmouth (which became part of the A40).

== Road safety ==
In June 2008, the 27-mile (43 km) Gloucester – Chepstow stretch of the A48 was named as the most dangerous road in South West England. This single carriageway had 45 fatal and serious injury collisions between 2004 and 2006, and was rated as medium risk in the EuroRAP report published by the Road Safety Foundation.

On 6 March 2023, five people were found after they had been missing for two days. Three of the five were found dead following a believed car crash after their car was found on the A48 in St Mellons, with the other two injured.

== See also ==
- Southern Distributor Road - the A48 distributor road south of Newport
- City Bridge - a crossing of the River Usk which forms part of the Southern Distributor Road.
