= A4050 road =

Road in the Vale of Glamorgan, Wales

A4050

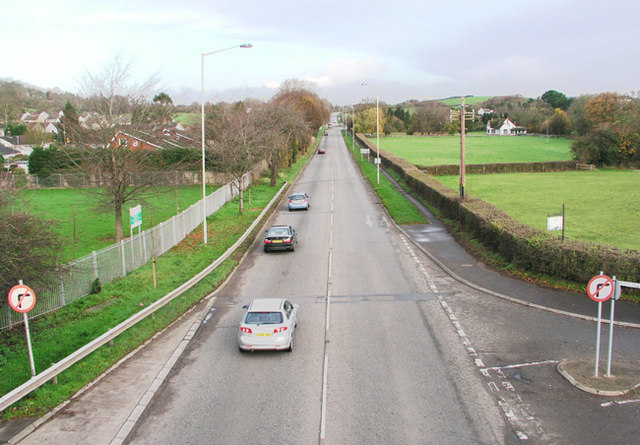
- The A4050 at Wenvoe

Route information
- Length: 10 mi (16 km)

Major junctions
- North end: Culverhouse Cross; 51.4651°N 3.2707°W
- A48 A4232 A4231 A4226 A4055
- South end: Barry; 51.3943°N 3.2880°W

Location
- Country: United Kingdom
- Constituent country: Wales
- Primary destinations: Cardiff

Road network
- Roads in the United Kingdom; Motorways; A and B road zones
| ← A4049 | → A4051 |

The A4050 road connects Barry, Vale of Glamorgan with Culverhouse Cross on the outskirts of Cardiff, Wales. It is approximately 10 miles (16 km) long, and is the key link road between the M4 motorway and Cardiff International Airport.

== 2008 road improvements ==
Wenvoe village lies along the road. In 2008 the Welsh Assembly allocated £576,000 to road resurfacing and improvement, which as of 2012 was still ongoing. One area given specific attention is the area around Pencoedtre between Waycock Cross and Barry as housing development and a new crematorium has been created in recent times.

== Culverhouse Cross ==
At Culverhouse Cross, the A4050 connects to the A48 and the A4232. The A48 links with Cowbridge and to Cowbridge Road West which connects the western Cardiff district of Ely to Canton and the city centre. The A4232 links with the M4 at junction 33 and Cardiff Bay.

== History ==
=== Original 1932 route ===
In 1932, the A4050 was a short road along the Rhymney Valley, connecting Bargoed with the A4049 in both directions.

Starting on the A4049 at Pengam, the road headed west across the river before turning northwards. The road ran through the centre of Bargoed before detouring west to cross the narrow Darran Valley. After rejoining the Rhymney Valley the road continued upstream via Brithdir to end back on the A4049 at Tir-Phil.

The original northern end of the A469 was in Ystrad Mynach. Later in the 1920s, that road was extended north to meet the A4050 near Pengam railway station and then, in 1935, the entire A4050 was renumbered as part of a northern extension of the A469, giving that road the spur that survives to this day. Bargoed has since been bypassed.
