= Southern Distributor Road =

Road in Wales

Coordinates: 51.5768°N 2.97447°W

A48

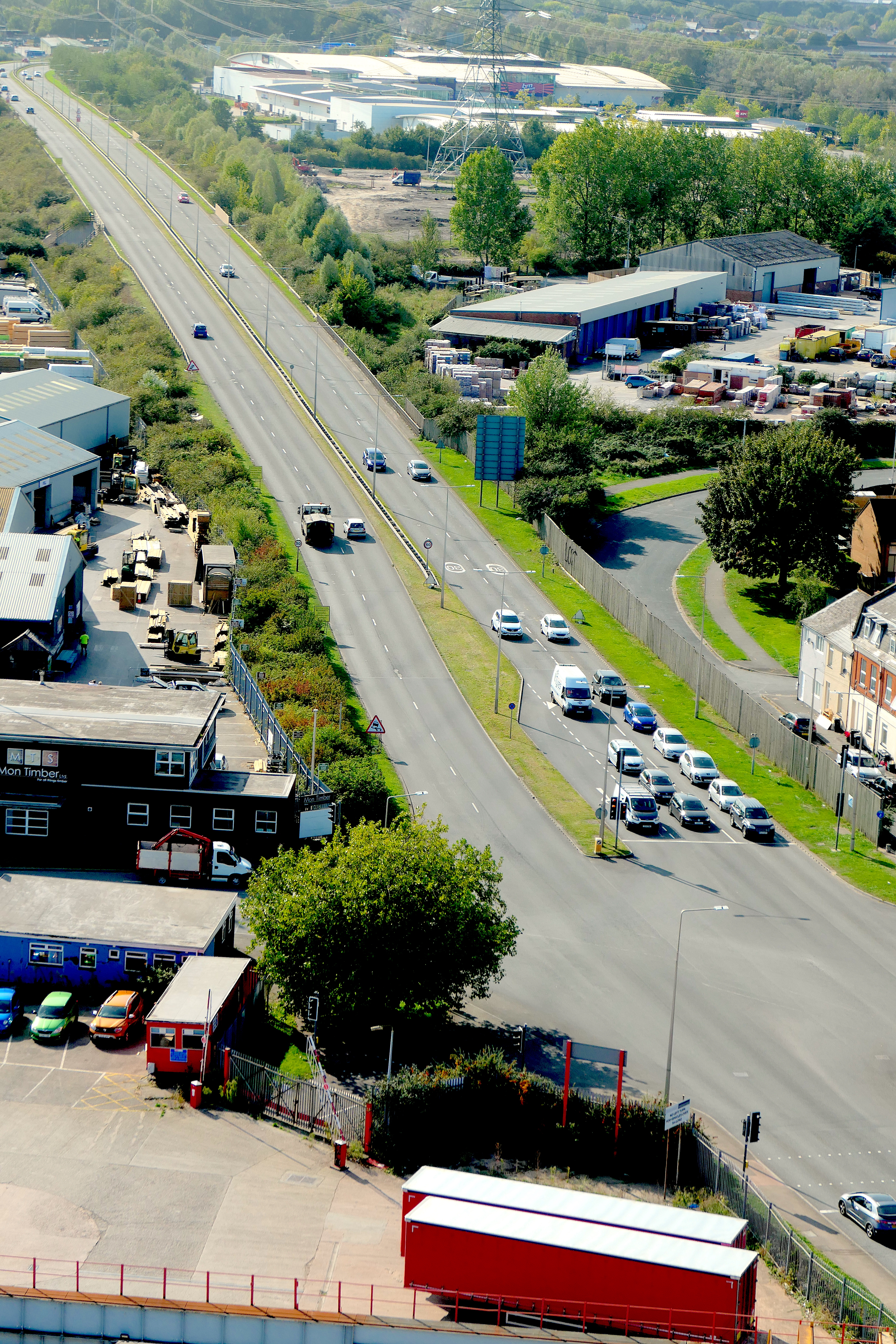

Route information
- Length: 8 mi (13 km)
- History: Construction completed 2004

Major junctions
- East end: Ringland, East Newport
- M4 J24 A4042; M4 J28
- West end: Tredegar Park, West Newport

Location
- Country: United Kingdom

Road network
- Roads in the United Kingdom; Motorways; A and B road zones

The Southern Distributor Road (SDR) is a principal distributor road in Newport that runs from the Coldra roundabout (M4 junction 24) in the east of Newport to Tredegar Park M4 Junction 28) in the west of Newport and includes City Bridge, a bow-string arch bridge spanning the River Usk. Combined with the M4 in the north, the SDR forms the southern part of a ring road for the city.

The new road completed in 2004 encompassed Ringland Way, Spytty Road, East Dock Road, Usk Way and Docks Way. The eastern section (Ringland Way) and the western section (Docks Way) were originally built with reserved land to one side for eventual widening. The SDR plans were drawn up to make use of this land and to join the two sections together across the river to form a continuous dual carriageway from one side of the city to the other. On completion it assumed the number A48 replacing the Chepstow Road/Cardiff Road corridor which was downgraded to B4237.

The urban regeneration company Newport Unlimited described the opening of the SDR as a critical piece of Newport's regeneration jigsaw. The new road was designed to improve the environment in the city centre, taking traffic away from residential areas, and improving access to industrial areas in the east and south of the city.

== Facts and figures ==
- The road and associated structures were built as part of a Private Finance Initiative.
- The route extends from M4 junction 24 Coldra roundabout in the east, to Ebbw Bridge roundabout in the west (as the A48). The A48 itself continues to M4 junction 28.
- The 8 miles (13 kilometres) road is a fully kerbed tarmacadam dual carriageway.
- There are link roads, roundabouts, junctions, continuous footpath, cycleways, fencing, noise barriers and street furniture.
- The highlight of the route is the 650 ft (200-metre)-long steel, bow string arch City Bridge over the River Usk.
- The site of the new crossing is between the 40-year-old George Street Bridge, Britain's first cable-stayed bridge and the Newport Transporter Bridge, which is over 100 years old.
- There are nine roundabouts on the SDR and four subways.
- More than 200 staff worked on putting it together.
- 4,000 cones; 127,000 tonnes of asphalt and macadam; 4,000 tonnes of steel were used in the making of the SDR.
