= Bonvilston =

Coordinates: 51°27′31″N 03°20′38″W

Bonvilston: Welsh: Tresimwn
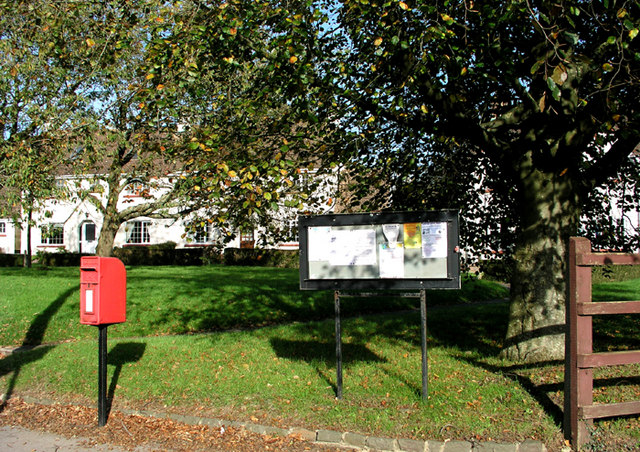
- Bonvilston village green

- Location within the Vale of Glamorgan
- OS grid reference: ST065741
- Community: St Nicholas and Bonvilston
- Principal area: Vale of Glamorgan
- Preserved county: South Glamorgan
- Country: Wales
- Sovereign state: United Kingdom
- Post town: Cardiff
- Postcode district: CF5
- Police: South Wales
- Fire: South Wales
- Ambulance: Welsh
- UK Parliament: Vale of Glamorgan
- Senedd Cymru – Welsh Parliament: Vale of Glamorgan

Bonvilston (Welsh: Tresimwn) is a village in the Vale of Glamorgan, Wales. The village is situated on the A48 about four miles east of Cowbridge and near the Welsh capital city of Cardiff. The population in 2011 was 392.

== History ==
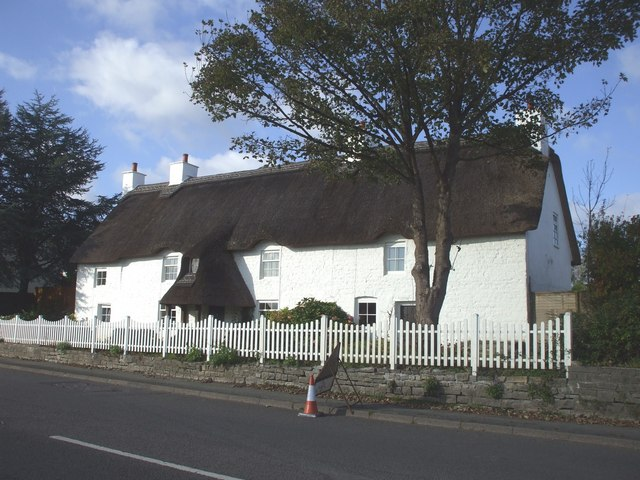
A thatched house

It is named after Simon de Bonville, a Norman nobleman; hence the name of the village, though different in English and Welsh, translates as "Simon's town" or "Bonville's town" and refers to the same person. Simon de Bonville lived here in the 12th century. In 1291, "Margam conveyed to Thomas le Spudur of Bonvilston an acre of arable land with a house and curtilage in the vill of 'Tudekistowe', which Thomas, son of Robert had previously leased from the abbey; in exchange, Thomas gave the abbey two acres of land in Bonvilston." The manor subsequently became increasingly under the power of Margam Abbey.

In the 19th century, Richard Bassett, a prominent figure in Glamorgan resided at Bonvilston House and owned the manor. The 1811 A Topographical Dictionary of The Dominion of Wales by Nicholas Carlisle said of the village:

"BONVILSTON, in the Cwmwd of Is Caeth, Cantref of Brenhinol (now called the Hundred of Dinas Powys), Co. of GLAMORGAN, South Wales: a discharged Curacy, valued in the King's Books at £6..9..2: Church dedicated to St. Mary. The Resident Population of this Parish, in 1801, was 203. The Money raised by the Parish Rates, in 1803, was £67..14..0, at 1s. 6d. per acre. It is 4 m. E. from Cowbridge. This Parish contains about 960 Customary acres of inclosed land: of which, 100 acres nearly are in Wood. It is a Lay Impropriation, the property of the Bassetts of Bonvilston. The present Incumbent is The Rev. Mr. Bassett, of Swansea. One of the largest Roman Camps in the Neighbourhood is situate in this Parish. According to the Diocesan Report, in 1809, the yearly value of this Benefice, arising from Tythes, Stipend, and Augmentation, was £32..11..3."

== Notable landmarks ==
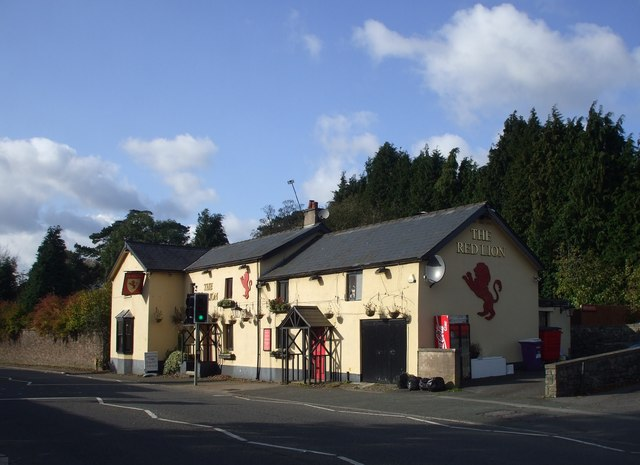
The Red Lion

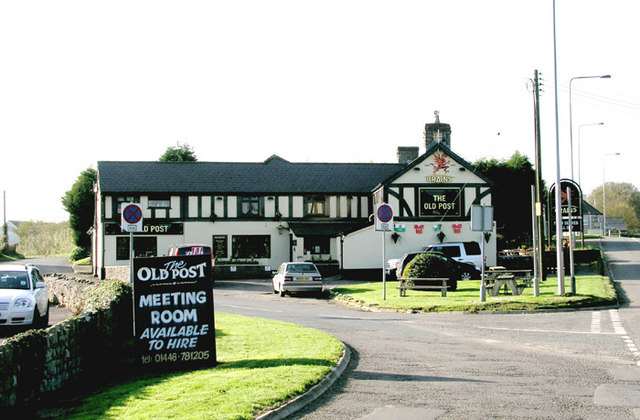
The Old Post

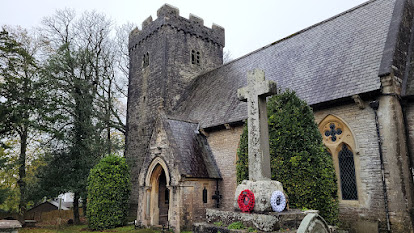
St Marys Church, Bonvilston

The village has two pubs, The Red Lion, and The Aubrey Arms. A Third pub, The Old Post, closed in 2019 and in 2021, permission was granted to convert this into a hotel. There is a corner shop called the old village shop. St Mary's parish church, rebuilt in 1860 in the Victorian era style retains a late mediaeval Sanctus bell.
