= A4160 road =

Road in Cardiff, Wales

Coordinates: 51.4600°N 3.1967°W

A4160

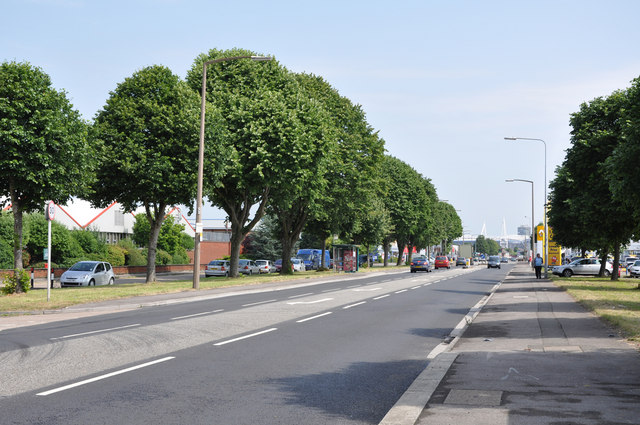
- Penarth Road looking towards Cardiff city centre

Major junctions
- East end: Cardiff
- A4161 A4234 A470 A4119 A4055
- West end: Penarth

Location
- Country: United Kingdom
- Constituent country: Wales
- Primary destinations: Cardiff

Road network
- Roads in the United Kingdom; Motorways; A and B road zones
← A4159	→ A4161

The A4160 is a road between Cardiff and Penarth in Wales. Its role as the main road between Cardiff city centre and Penarth has largely been superseded by the A4055 and A4232 roads via Cardiff Bay.

== Route ==
The route begins at traffic lights with the A4161 Newport Road and West Grove, in the city centre of Cardiff. It heads south along the dual-carriageway Fitzalan Place, before turning west along Adam Street, where the A4160 meets the A4234 Central Link. The road turns left onto Bute Street, to turn right at Callaghan Square, where it runs concurrent with the A470 for around 200 yards (180 m), before reaching a roundabout. Here we continue straight onto Tresillian Way, whilst the A470 turns right onto St Mary's Way. As Tresillian Way, we pass Cardiff Central Station, before becoming Penarth Road, continuing in a south-westerly direction. It crosses through the Penarth Road commercial district then crosses the River Taff, before entering a residential area, where we meet the A4119. We continue to follow Penarth Road, which becomes a local high street, before reaching Grangetown station overhead and an industrial estate. Then, the A4160 passes over the River Ely, before immediately afterwards passing under the A4232 Grangetown Link (with no junction), after which it turns to a south easterly direction. It meets the A4055 at a crossroads, where it becomes Cogan Hill briefly, to pass Cogan station and retail park, before changing its name to Windsor Road. Windsor Road passes two railway stations; Dingle Road station and Penarth station in the town centre of Penarth.

== History ==
=== Proposed route: Aston Clinton – Dunstable ===
In 1935 the A4160 designation was proposed for an upgrade of the B489, which was to form a route from Swindon to East Anglia with the A5160 (which was proposed to be used instead of A505 for the A505/A601 route, to give the number continuity). As the tonnage wasn't enough on the B489 to elevate it to Class I, and never looked likely to, the proposal fell through and that road still exists.

== Sources ==
- Google Maps UK

== See also ==
- Transport in Cardiff
