= St Nicholas and Bonvilston =

Community in Vale of Glamorgan, Wales

- Community
- Principal area: Vale of Glamorgan
- Country: Wales
- Sovereign state: United Kingdom
- Police: South Wales
- Fire: South Wales
- Ambulance: Welsh
- Councillors: 10 community-level Ian Perry (chair)
- Website: www.stnicholasbonvilston-cc.wales
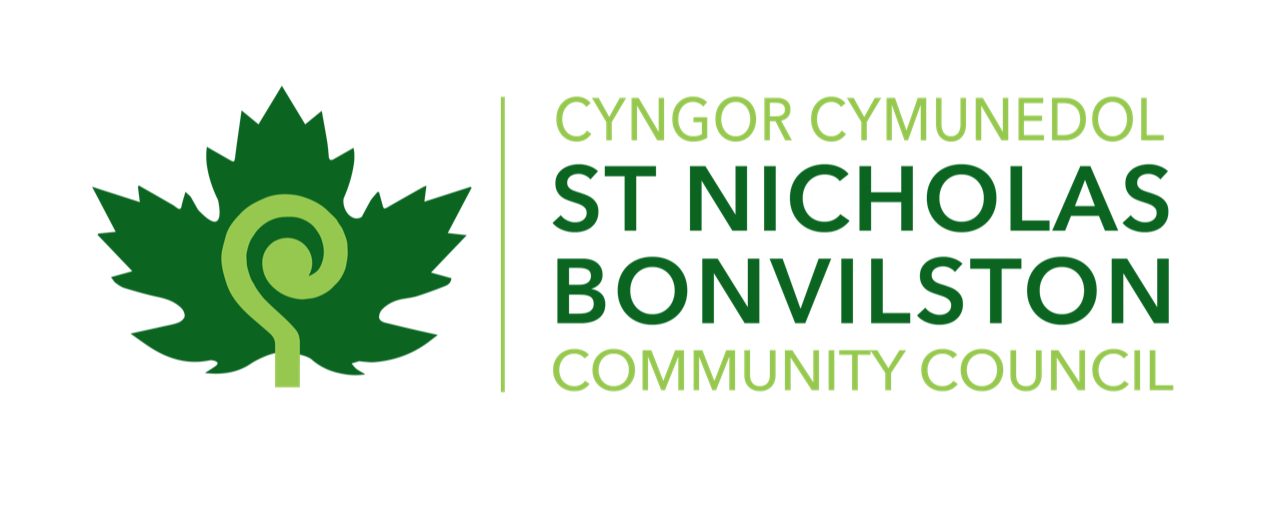
- List of places UK Wales Vale of Glamorgan Map of the community Logo of the community council

St Nicholas and Bonvilston is a community in the Vale of Glamorgan, Wales. Formed in 1982, it includes the villages of St Nicholas, Bonvilston, and four properties in Dyffryn.

In August 2020, St Nicholas had 294 dwellings and 451 electors. Bonvilston had 296 dwellings and 346 electors. The population in 2011 was 809.

== Representation ==
=== County Council ===
In 2022 the community became part of a new county electoral ward, St Nicholas and Llancarfan, which elects one county councillor to the Vale of Glamorgan Council.

=== Community Council ===
St Nicholas with Bonvilston Community Council has ten members. Six members representing the St Nicholas Community Ward, and four members representing the Bonvilston Community Ward. Elections are held every five years, although these have been uncontested for many years.

The first Chair of the Community Council was Roy Burston, who held the position for 18 of the first 35 years of the council.

The Community Council charges a precept to the Vale of Glamorgan Council. In the year 2019-20 this was £9,095.

==== Issues ====
The Community Council is opposed to the Vale of Glamorgan Council's proposals to build new dwellings on the Village Green at Maes y ffynon, Bonvilston

The Community Council is opposing present plans to enlarge St Nicholas CIW School on the present site.
