= A4241 road =

Distributor road in Port Talbot

Coordinates: 51.5993°N 3.8063°W

A4241
- Port Talbot Peripheral Distributor Road
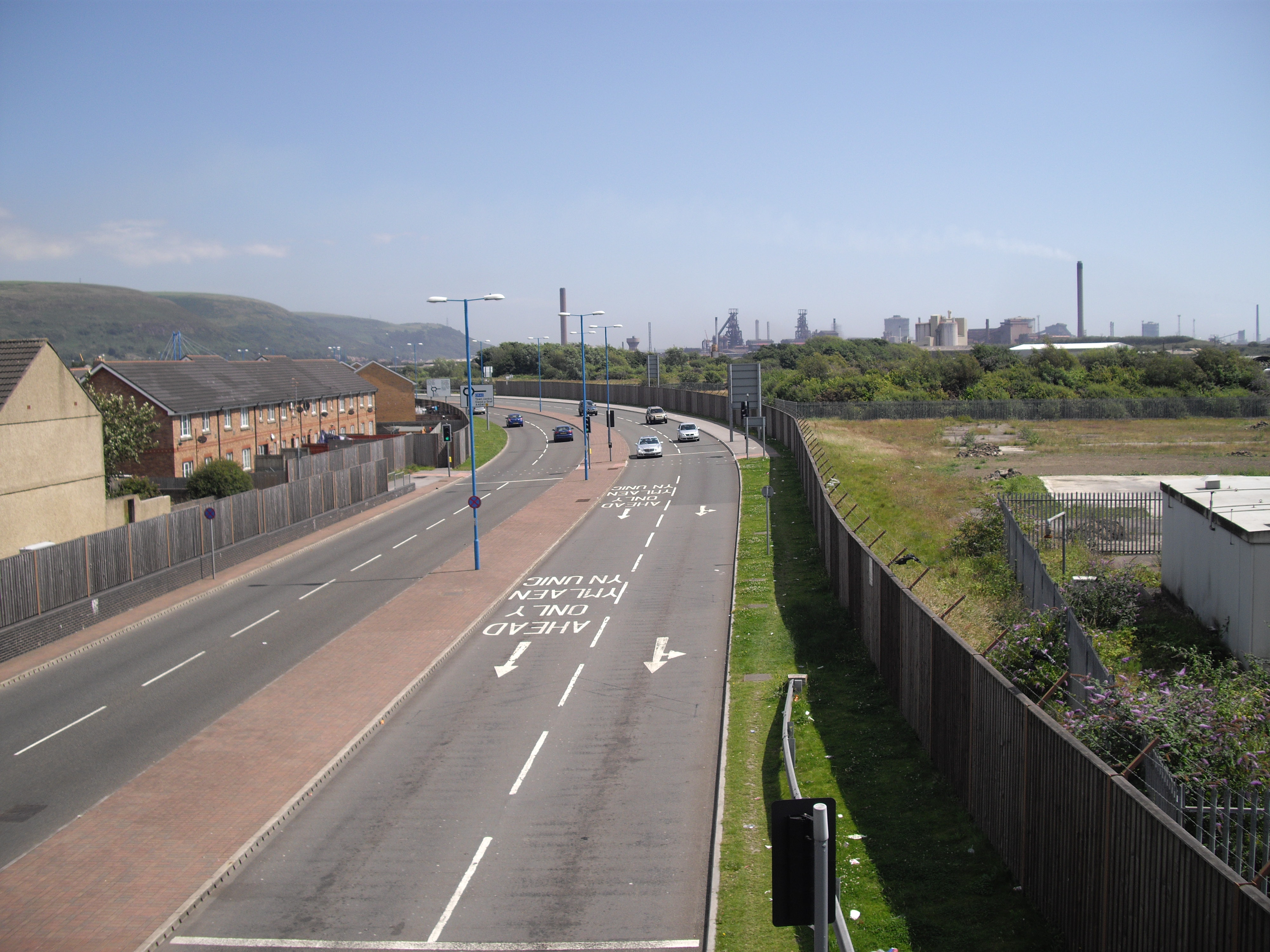

Major junctions
- Northwest end: Baglan
- A48; M4
- Southeast end: Port Talbot

Location
- Country: United Kingdom
- Constituent country: Wales
- Primary destinations: Port Talbot

Road network
- Roads in the United Kingdom; Motorways; A and B road zones

The A4241 Port Talbot Peripheral Distributor Road is a distributor road serving Port Talbot, Wales.

== Route ==
The A4241 begins at the Sunnycroft roundabout in Baglan near Baglan railway station traversing Seaway Parade in a south westerly direction, where it serves the Baglan Bay area and the Baglan Energy Park, until the junction with Afan Way. The route then continues in a south easterly direction along Afan Way, serving the Sandfields housing estate to the southwest and the Baglan Industrial Park and Neath Port Talbot Hospital to the northeast. The A4241 then, crosses the River Afan and traverses the northern area of Port Talbot docks. It then continues past the steelworks where it joins the A48 and the M4 motorway at M4 Junction 38.

== Port Talbot Peripheral Distributor Road ==
=== Premise ===
The Peripheral Distributor Road was developed to assist in the industrial and commercial development of the south western area of Port Talbot, to free the flow of traffic from the busy section of the M4 motorway between Junctions 38 at Margam and Junction 41 at Baglan and to provide environmental improvements, by way of reduced traffic noise and pollution, to the populated residential areas between these junctions.

The route of the A4241 provides access to land that is available for development and also removes local traffic from the M4 which is approaching full capacity around Port Talbot. It is also forecast that traffic volumes will rise in the future by 40%. Since the areas beside the elevated section is well developed, it is not feasible to widen the motorway.

=== Development and construction ===
The Peripheral Distributor Road scheme is funded by the Welsh Assembly Government Transport Grant, Objective 1 and the Local Regeneration Fund. The scheme was designed by Neath Port Talbot County Borough Council and tendered under the Engineering and Construction Contract, Option D. The successful tenderer was the Hochtief Griffiths Joint Venture.

The route is being developed in stages:

Stage	Details	Start date	Completion
1a	The dualling of Seaway Parade from Baglan to Lonlas. The work was completed alongside the M4 Extension.		
1b	The dualling of Afan Way.	12 September 2005	February 2007
1c	Stage 1c included the construction of 1.1 km of a new dual 7.3m carriageway with 2 new roundabouts, footways, a cycleway, new lighting and landscaping works. This section is the central portion of the intended complete route running from M4 Junction 38 to the Sunnycroft roundabout on the A48. It connects the existing A48 roundabout near Port Tabot bus station to the Port Talbot Industrial Estate, Port Talbot Docks and Afan Way. The development of this stage involved the purchase of private land, including business premises which needed to be demolished. Traffic calming measures were introduced to Water Street (the existing well used thoroughfare between central Port Talbot and Sandfields) to encourage use of the new route.	June 2004	30 November 2005.
2; Harbour Way Project	Stage 2 will link the southern end of Stage 1c/Water Street in the Port Talbot Industrial Estate with the M4 Motorway at Junction 38 (Margam Interchange). The route will continue parallel with Dock Road up to Oakwood Road and then cross the vacant land parallel to the railway line. The new road will cross the railway at the existing Corus entrance on Cefn Cwrgan Road, following which, it runs south east across the southern area of the Corus Sports and Social club and adjoining fields, then finally to the Junction with the M4. Environmental works will be carried out to discourage motorists from using the stretch of the A48 through the built up residential areas of Taibach and Margam and to use the new route instead.	14 December 2010	22 August 2013
