= Transport in Cardiff =

Overview of the transport system in Cardiff, Wales

An Intercity Express Train departs from the newly-electrified Cardiff Central station for London Paddington

Transport in Cardiff, the capital and most populous city in Wales, includes road, railway, bus, water and air transport. It is a major city of the United Kingdom and a centre of employment, government, retail, business, culture, media, sport and higher education.

== Overview of recent usage trends ==
Statistics from the 2021 Census showed that almost 12.5% of Cardiff's workforce walks or cycles to work; this is more than other areas in Wales, but that 40% of their commuters still rely heavily on their cars. Driving in the Welsh capital declined at the beginning of the 21st century, but it has increased significantly since 2011. The distance driven by cars and taxis (Note: Includes both commuting flows and driving for pleasure.) kept rising everywhere, especially in Cardiff, where it increased by 19% between 2011 and 2019. The emergence of ride-hailing apps since 2016 has aided a reversal of the trend observed in the years before 2011.

Since 2008, rail ridership has been increasing, but this has been dwarfed by the decline in bus use. Railway passengers rose by 4.3 million per year between 2008 and 2019, while the local bus passengers fell by 34.3 million per year in the same period.

== Roads ==
Cardiff is well served by the M4 motorway, which connects Carmarthen with London, via Swansea, Llanelli, Bridgend, Newport, Bristol, Bath, Swindon, Reading and Heathrow Airport. The city can be accessed directly from junctions 29–34 inclusive:

=== Junctions ===
M4 motorway
| Eastbound exits | Junction | Westbound exits |
| No access | J29 | Cardiff East and South A48(M) |
| Cardiff East A4232 | J30; Cardiff Gate services | Cardiff East A4232 |
| Cardiff North, Merthyr Tydfil A470 | J32 | Cardiff North, Merthyr Tydfil A470 |
| Cardiff West, Cardiff International Airport, Barry, Penarth A4232 | J33; Cardiff West services | Cardiff West, Cardiff International Airport, Barry, Penarth A4232 |
| Llantrisant, Rhondda, Cardiff North West A4119 | J34 | Pendoylan, Cardiff West, to the A48 |

A48 (M) motorway
| Eastbound exits | Junction / Interchange | Westbound exits |
| Newport, Chepstow, London M4 | M4 J29 | Start of A48(M) |
| Start of A48(M) | J29A | No exit |

A48
| Eastbound exits | Interchange | Westbound exits |
| St Mellons A48 | J29A | Start of A48 |
| Bridgend (M4), Pontprennau, Cardiff Gate A4232 | Pentwyn Interchange | Bridgend (M4), Pontprennau, Cardiff Gate A4232 |
| Pentwyn | Llanrumney Interchange | Pentwyn |
| Cardiff East, Docks, Cardiff Bay A4232 | Llanedeyrn Interchange | Cardiff East, Docks, Cardiff Bay A4232 |
| Access only | University Hospital of Wales | University Hospital of Wales |
| (M4 West), University Hospital, City centre A470 | Gabalfa Interchange | City centre, (M4) A470 |
| Start of permanent dual carriageway | Gabalfa Interchange | Road continues as mostly single carriageway |
| Llantrisant A4119 | Road junction | City centre, Llantrisant A4119 |
| Fairwater, St Fagans, Pentrebaine B4488 | Road junction | Fairwater, St Fagans, Pentrebaine B4488 |
| City centre, Cardiff Bay A4161 | Roundabout | City centre, Cardiff Bay A4161 |
| St Fagans | Road junction | St Fagans |
| City centre, Penarth A4232; Barry A4055 (M4), Newport, Bridgend A4232 | Culverhouse Cross; Roundabout | City centre, Penarth A4232; Barry A4055 (M4), Newport, Bridgend A4232 |
| Start of A48 | – | End of A48 |

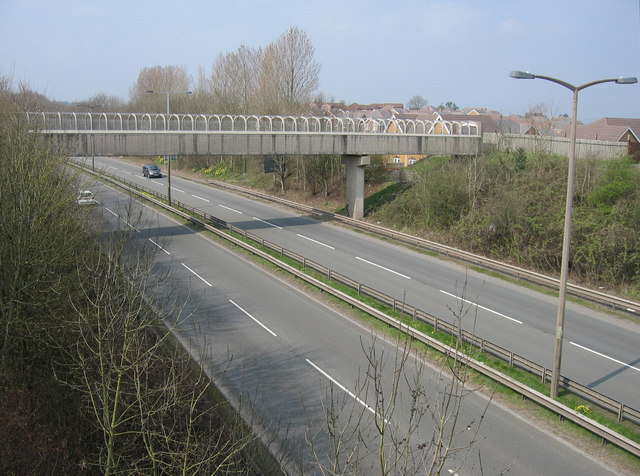
A4232 Ely Link Road, known as the Peripheral Distributor Road

The A48(M) connects junction 29 to the city centre, with exits for the suburbs of St Mellons, where it becomes the A48, Pontprennau (M4 junction 30, via the A4232), Pentwyn, Rumney, Llanedeyrn and the University Hospital of Wales.

The A4232, also known as the Peripheral Distributor Road, connects M4 junction 33 with 30 by bypassing through the south of the city. From junction 33, exits are at Culverhouse Cross Interchange, Leckwith Interchange, Ferry Road Interchange (for Barry and Penarth) and Butetown, the road ends at Queen's Gate Roundabout, where the long-awaited Eastern Bay Link Road will eventually link with the Southern Way Link Road. It then continues to the M4 at junction 30, via the A48 (Eastern Avenue) and the Pentwyn Link Road (A4232).

The A470 is the main North–South Wales route running from Cardiff Bay to Llandudno, via exits for the suburbs of Tongwynlais and Taff's Well. It provides an important link with the Heads of the Valleys road to Mid and North Wales.

As with many other cities car traffic has caused congestion problems and, as such, Cardiff Council has designated bus lanes to improve transport into and out of the city centre. The Welsh Assembly Government considered the introduction of variable congestion charging in the city centre, but only once there has been significant investment in the city's public transport network; the council formally backed away from a controversial city-wide road user congestion charge in July 2026.

There are several road and railway bridges that cross the river Taff, including the Clarence Road Bridge. This is comparatively modern, having replaced a swing bridge that was demolished in 1975, and is named after the Duke of Clarence.

Much of Cardiff's central shopping zone is pedestrianised; further pedestrianisation is planned as part of the St David's 2 regeneration scheme.

== Railways ==
The largest stations in the city, and in Wales, are Cardiff Central and Cardiff Queen Street, which over ten million people use each year. They are both operated by Transport for Wales.

=== National ===
Central station is the tenth busiest in the United Kingdom outside of London, with eight platforms. It is a principal station on the South Wales Main Line; national services are operated by three train operating companies on the following routes:

Great Western Railway

- London Paddington, via Bristol Parkway and Reading
- Swansea and West Wales
- Portsmouth Harbour, via Bristol Temple Meads, Bath Spa and Southampton Central.

Transport for Wales

- Holyhead, via Newport, Abergavenny, Wrexham General, Chester and Llandudno Junction
- Manchester Piccadilly, via Newport, Abergavenny, Hereford, Shrewsbury and Crewe
- Milford Haven, via Swansea, Carmarthen and Haverfordwest
- Pembroke Dock, via Swansea and Carmarthen.

CrossCountry

- Nottingham, via Bristol Temple Meads and Birmingham New Street.

=== Suburban ===
Queen Street station

Central and Queen Street stations are the hubs of the Valley Lines network, operated by Transport for Wales (TfW). Electrification of the core lines was completed in early 2026. There are eight lines that connect the city to:

- 20 smaller stations in the city
- 26 stations in the wider urban area, including Taffs Well, Penarth and Dinas Powys
- More than 60 in the South Wales valleys and the Vale of Glamorgan.

=== Park and ride ===
There are four railway-based park and ride systems operating in the city; over 2,000 parking spaces (Note: Including over 100 accessible spaces.) are provided at 24 railway stations, all within 30 minutes of Central station by train:

- Cardiff North: from ten stations, including Caerphilly and Pontypridd
- Cardiff East: from five stations, including Cwmbran and Newport
- Cardiff South: from five stations, including Barry and Penarth
- Cardiff West: from four stations, including Bridgend.

These services form part of the council's Sustainable Cardiff initiative, which is partly funded by the Welsh Assembly Government.

== Buses and coaches ==
=== National ===
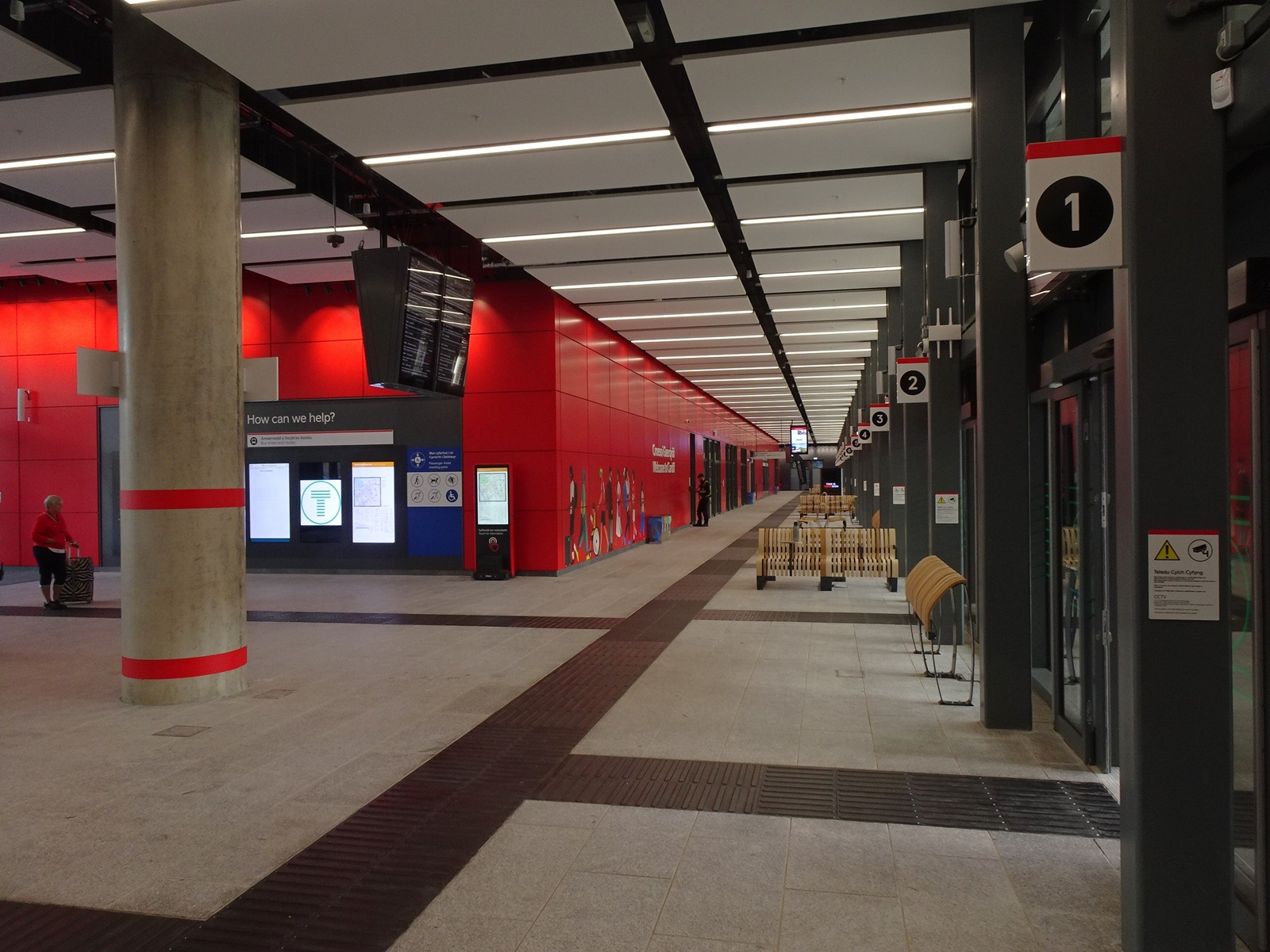
The new Bus Interchange concourse

Cardiff Bus Interchange is the main hub for services to destinations outside Cardiff and the Vale, such as First Cymru's X2 to Bridgend and Porthcawl, 320 to Talbot Green and Stagecoach South Wales services to the Valleys.

TrawsCymru route T1C to Carmarthen and Aberystwyth departs from Tresilian Way.

National Express operates routes to Swansea, Llanelli, Bristol Airport, Heathrow Airport, Gatwick Airport and London Victoria from Pontcanna, near Sophia Gardens.

FlixBus services link the city with Swansea, Bristol, Gatwick Airport, London Victoria, Birmingham, Sheffield, Leeds and Newcastle-upon-Tyne from Kingsway bus stop stop in the Castle Quarter.

=== Local ===
Cardiff Bus operates a comprehensive network of routes in and around the city; it also operates routes to Newport, Penarth, Barry, Cardiff Airport and Llantwit Major. Stagecoach South Wales, Edwards Coaches, First Cymru and EST Buses also operate services in the city.

Cardiff Central bus station was closed in 2015, as part of the redevelopment of Central Square; its replacement is Cardiff Bus Interchange, which opened in May 2024. Other main bus stops in the city are located in Westgate Street, St Mary Street, Castle Street, Kingsway, Greyfriars Road, Dumfries Place and Queen Street station.

=== Park and ride ===
Cardiff’s park and ride bus services operate differently from TfW’s railway-based facilities. Cardiff Council's park and ride currently highlights a free hospital service from Cardiff East to the University Hospital of Wales and special arrangements for large events at the Millennium Stadium.

== Cycling ==
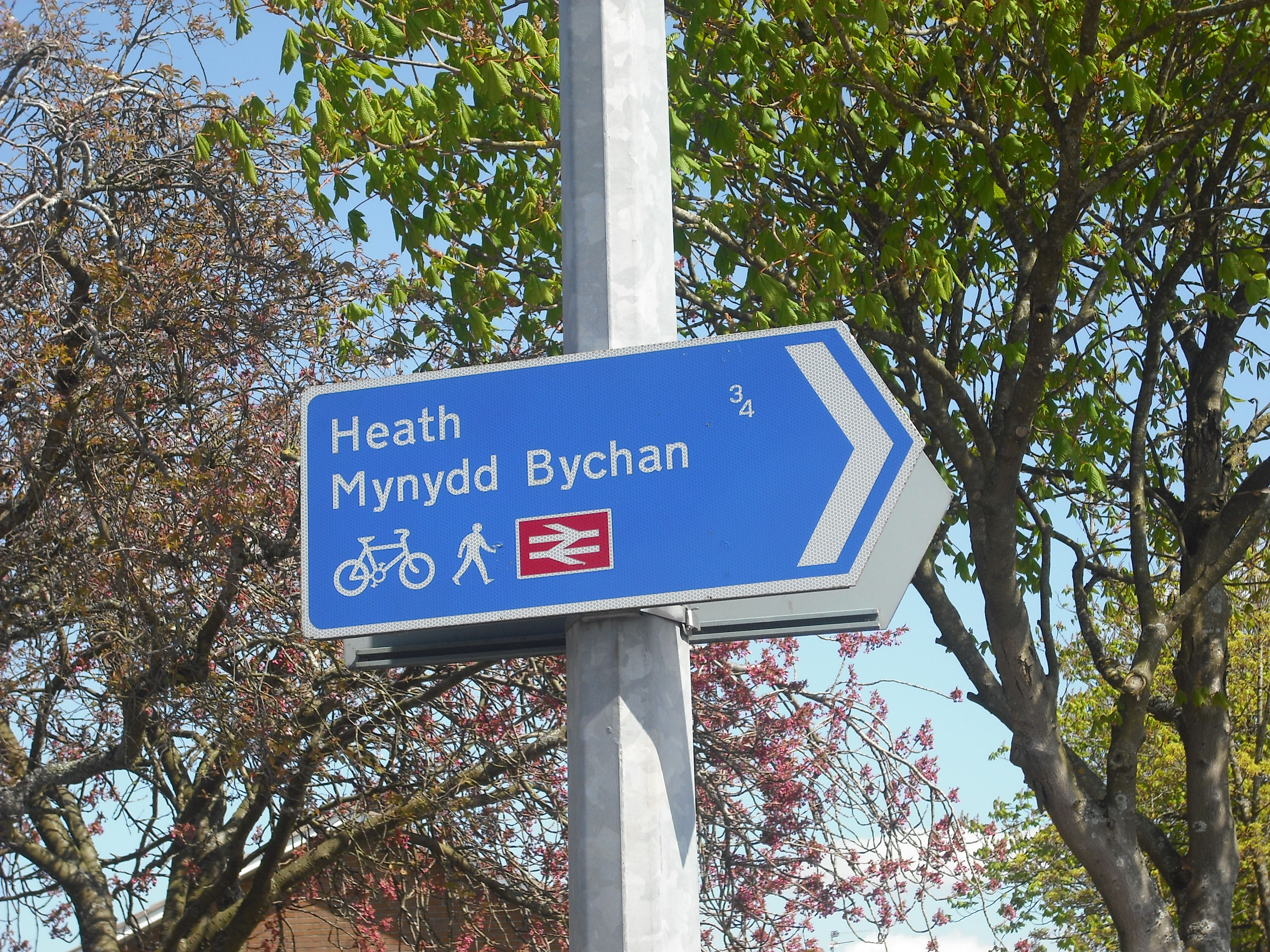
A directional sign for cyclists in Llanishen

Cycling in the city is facilitated by its easy gradients and large parks. In 2005, 4.3% of people commuted by bicycle to work, compared to 2% in London and 5% in Berlin. However, research by Cardiff University shows that cyclists in the city appear to be influenced by its deterrents and, as a result, will need greater improvement of facilities to increase take-up.

There are three major off-road cycle routes in the city, each following a river:

- Taff Trail follows the river Taff south to north from Cardiff Bay, through the city centre, Maindy, Llandaff, Radyr and Tongwynlais towards Brecon
- Ely Trail follows the river Ely west to east from St Fagans, through Fairwater, Leckwith and Grangetown to Cardiff Bay. This route is connected to Penarth, via Pont y Werin bridge
- Rhymney Trail follows the river Rhymney east to west in Pentwyn and Llanrumney.

== Water ==
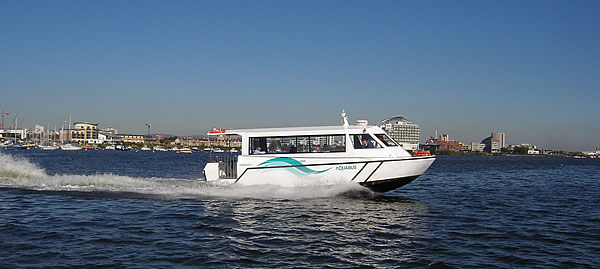
Aquabus

Aquabus water taxis operate hourly between the city centre (Taff Mead Embankment) and Cardiff Bay (Mermaid Quay), and between Cardiff Bay and Penarth. (Note: At Cardiff Bay barrage.) They sail between the Pierhead on the city's waterfront and the Penarth end of the Cardiff Bay Barrage, with short sightseeing cruises.

Boats also depart from Cardiff Bay to take visitors to Flat Holm island. The PS Waverley and MV Balmoral paddle steamers sail from Britannia Quay, in Roath Basin, to several destinations in the Bristol Channel.

== Air ==
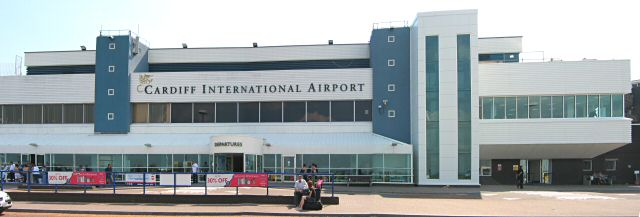
Cardiff Airport

Cardiff Airport serves South and West Wales, facilitating scheduled, charter and low-cost flights which operate to Anglesey, other UK destinations, Europe, Africa and North America.

It is located at Rhoose, in the south-west of the city; it has a dedicated railway station at Rhoose Cardiff International Airport and is also linked by the 304 bus route from Cardiff Bus Interchange.
