= Cardiff Gate services =

M4 service station in Cardiff, Wales

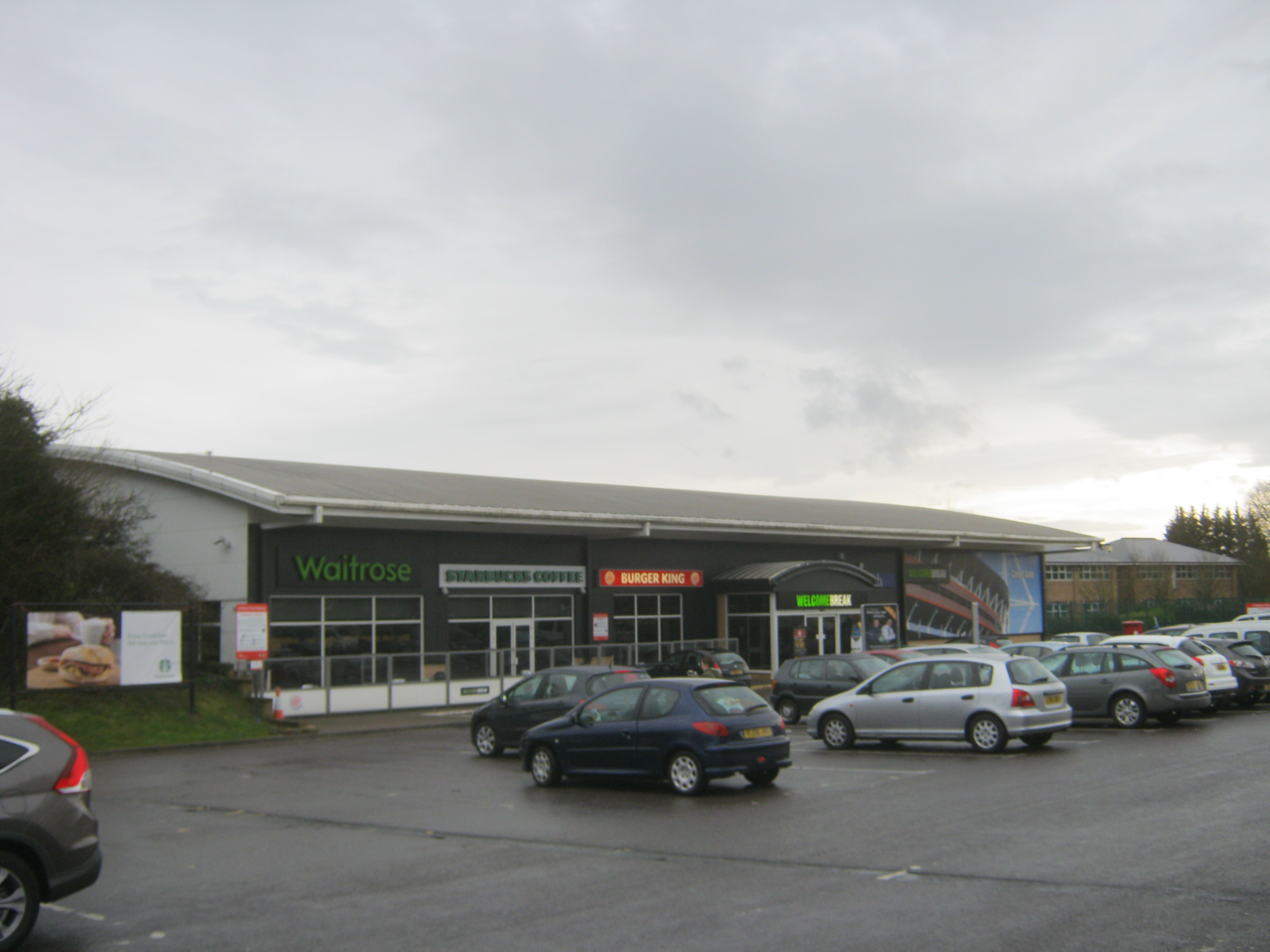

- Location within Cardiff

Information
- County: Cardiff
- Road: M4
- Coordinates: 51°32′21″N 3°07′48″W
- Operator: Welcome Break
- Previous operators: Cardiff Gate; Granada
- Date opened: 2001
- Website: welcomebreak.co.uk/locations/cardiff-gate/

Cardiff Gate services (Welsh: Gwasanaethau Porth Caerdydd) is the motorway service station on the junction of the M4 motorway (junction 30) and the A4232, located on the 100-acre (0.40 km^{2}) Cardiff Gate International Business Park, adjacent to Pontprennau, north east of Cardiff, Wales. Originally leased by Granada Ltd., it is now owned by Welcome Break.

== Gavin & Stacey ==
The services featured in the BBC1 television series Gavin & Stacey, masquerading as Leigh Delamere services, which is actually located further east along the M4 in Wiltshire.

Next eastbound: Magor	Motorway service stations on the M4 motorway	Next westbound: Cardiff West
