= Pontprennau =

Community in Cardiff, Wales

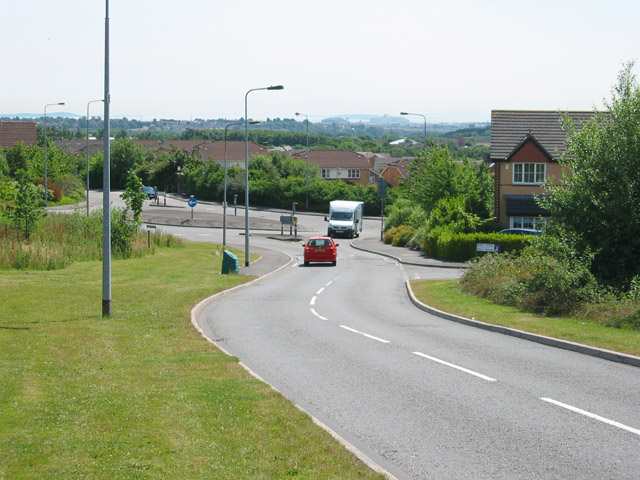
- Heol Glandulais runs through the centre of Pontprennau. The large buildings near the horizon are the CELSA Group Steelworks; between them is the island of Steep Holm. On the left horizon is Brean Down in Somerset

- Location within Cardiff
- Population: 7,353
- OS grid reference: ST214824
- Principal area: Cardiff
- Preserved county: South Glamorgan
- Country: Wales
- Sovereign state: United Kingdom
- Post town: CARDIFF
- Postcode district: CF23
- Dialling code: 029
- Police: South Wales
- Fire: South Wales
- Ambulance: Welsh
- UK Parliament: Cardiff North
- Senedd Cymru – Welsh Parliament: Cardiff North
- List of places UK Wales Cardiff 51.5365°N 3.1408°W Map of the community

Pontprennau (Welsh for 'bridge of trees') is a ward and community in the north of the city of Cardiff, Wales, lying north of Pentwyn and Cyncoed, between the village of Old St Mellons and the farmlands east of Lisvane. The community had a population of 7,353 in 2011.

== History ==
Pontprennau is Welsh for "Bridge of Trees". Lying east-west along the foot of the hills of the South Wales valleys, with Caerphilly directly north, the area is defined by a series of hills, intersected by shallow valleys created by streams which feed as tributaries into the Rhymney River.

Once a part of an area made up of several farms in Llanedeyrn, Pontprennau was designated in the 1970s for residential development, with the M4 Motorway Junction 30 developed for the purpose. It has expanded greatly since the early 1990s, driven primarily by private sector housing, and then corporate offices on Cardiff Gate. St. Mellons and Pontprennau were suburbs of Cardiff by 1974 and by the 1990s the estates started to spill over the boundaries into Lisvane and Cyncoed.

The Pontprennau community was created from part of the Llanedeyrn ward of the previously existing St Mellons community in 1996. The remaining part of the St Mellons community became Old St Mellons.

== Today ==
According to the United Kingdom Census 2001, there were 8,037 people living in Pontprennau. However, this has expanded greatly since, due to sustained housing development both in West Pontprennau and on further pieces of unused land.

East Pontprennau, adjacent to the M4 motorway junction 30, is the commercial sector of the development, housing Cardiff Gate Business Park, Cardiff Gate services, and Cardiff Gate Retail Park. The 100 acres (40 ha) business park provides office accommodation to regional representation for many multinational companies and is also home to the Emergency Control Centre for South Wales, as well as the fire training centre.

Central Pontprennau is mainly devoted to housing development. The northern edge and highest point in the community is where the community centre, the church, Pontprennau Primary School and Pontprennau Medical Centre, dentist and pharmacy are located. At the bottom of the hill is the western edge, which has a small commercial area, with a large proportion of the land dedicated to industrial use now being converted to private sector housing. It also houses the Spire Healthcare hospital.

West Pontprennau, situated to the west of Butterfield Park and bordering Lisvane, is the newest of the three areas. It consists mainly of residential housing, but it also contains an Aldi supermarket and Cyncoed Medical Centre, which transferred from Cyncoed to Pontprennau in 2005. There is also a small children's play area at Peppermint Park.

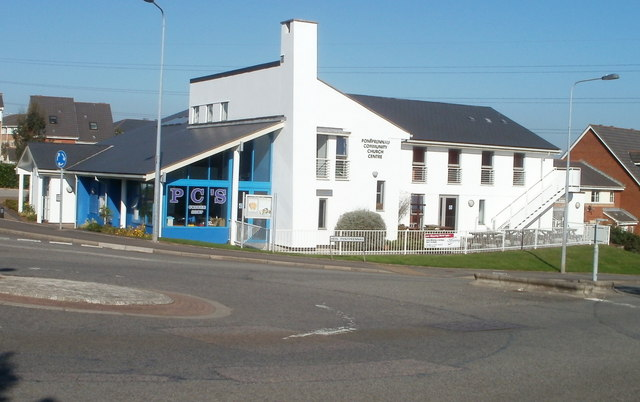
Pontprennau Community Church Centre

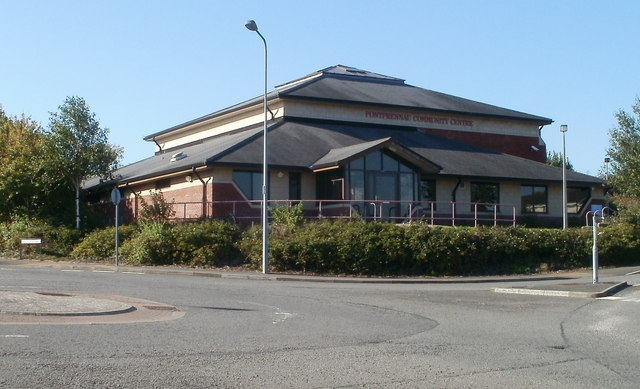
Pontprennau Community Centre, now part of the building of Pontprennau Primary school

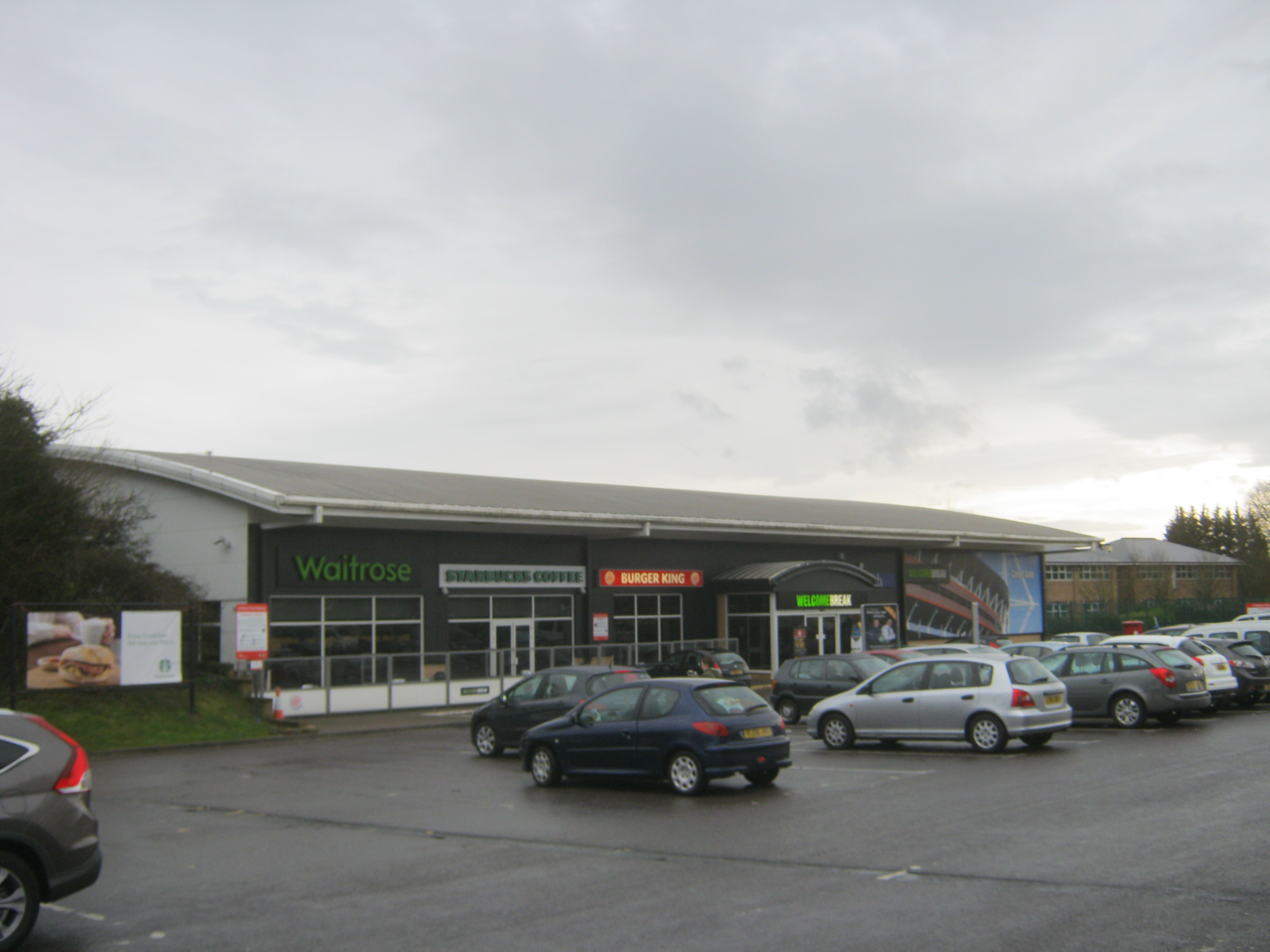
Cardiff Gate services

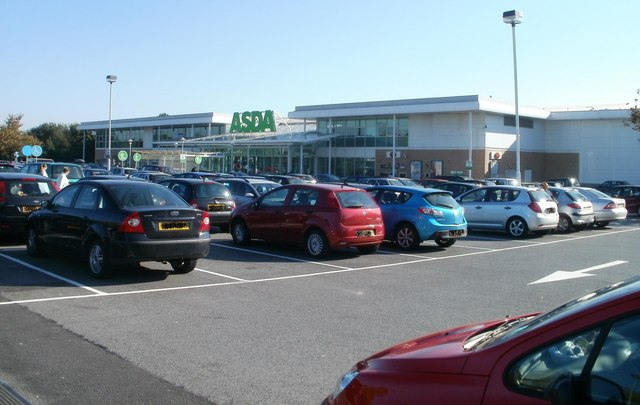
Asda supermarket in Cardiff Gate Retail Park

=== School ===
Pontprennau Primary school opened in September 2015. It is a 2 Form of Entry school with 48 full-time equivalent nursery places.

The school was completed in two phases. The first phase was ready in time for the school year starting September 2015. At this stage the school had two reception classes plus a nursery. The school was then fully open in time for the school year commencing September 2016.

The establishment of a primary school within Pontprennau aims to stop the over subscription of children attending schools in Lisvane and Llanishen. This project forms part of Cardiff Councils 21st Century Schools Programme which is 50% funding by Welsh Government.

== Proposed expansion ==
There are several sites remaining within the area with potential to be developed. The first is to the east in a plot east of the linkroad between Pontprenau and Old St Mellons. Scheduled to provide an additional 50 or more houses, this has now been turned down twice on planning permission. Developments further east would be barred, due to the scheduled green land space between Cardiff and Newport, in which Old St Mellons lies.

A proposed major expansion of the area to the west by the Welsh Government is opposed by Cardiff Council. This would see a development by Redrow plc of a further 4,000 houses in the farmland lying between West Pontprennau and Lisvane. However, since the Great Recession, and with apartments lying empty in Cardiff Bay and the councils pressing for development of brown field sites within the city first, development is delayed with no timescale.

In July 2012, Cardiff Council's preferred new Local Development Plan was released. The plan proposed 45,000 new homes to be built in Cardiff by 2026, allowing the city's population to rise by a quarter to more than 400,000. The proposal encompasses: 7,500 homes in a new suburb west of Pentrebane; 2,000 homes on land north of junction 33 on the M4; and 6,000 west and 2,000 east of Pontprennau.

The Pontprennau development would extend:

- West: 6,000 homes between Pontprennau to Lisvane, stretching as far north as the M4
- East: 2,000 homes in the green land, defined by a border south of the M4 and east to the border with Newport, connecting or subsuming Pontprennau and Old St Mellons

== Transport ==
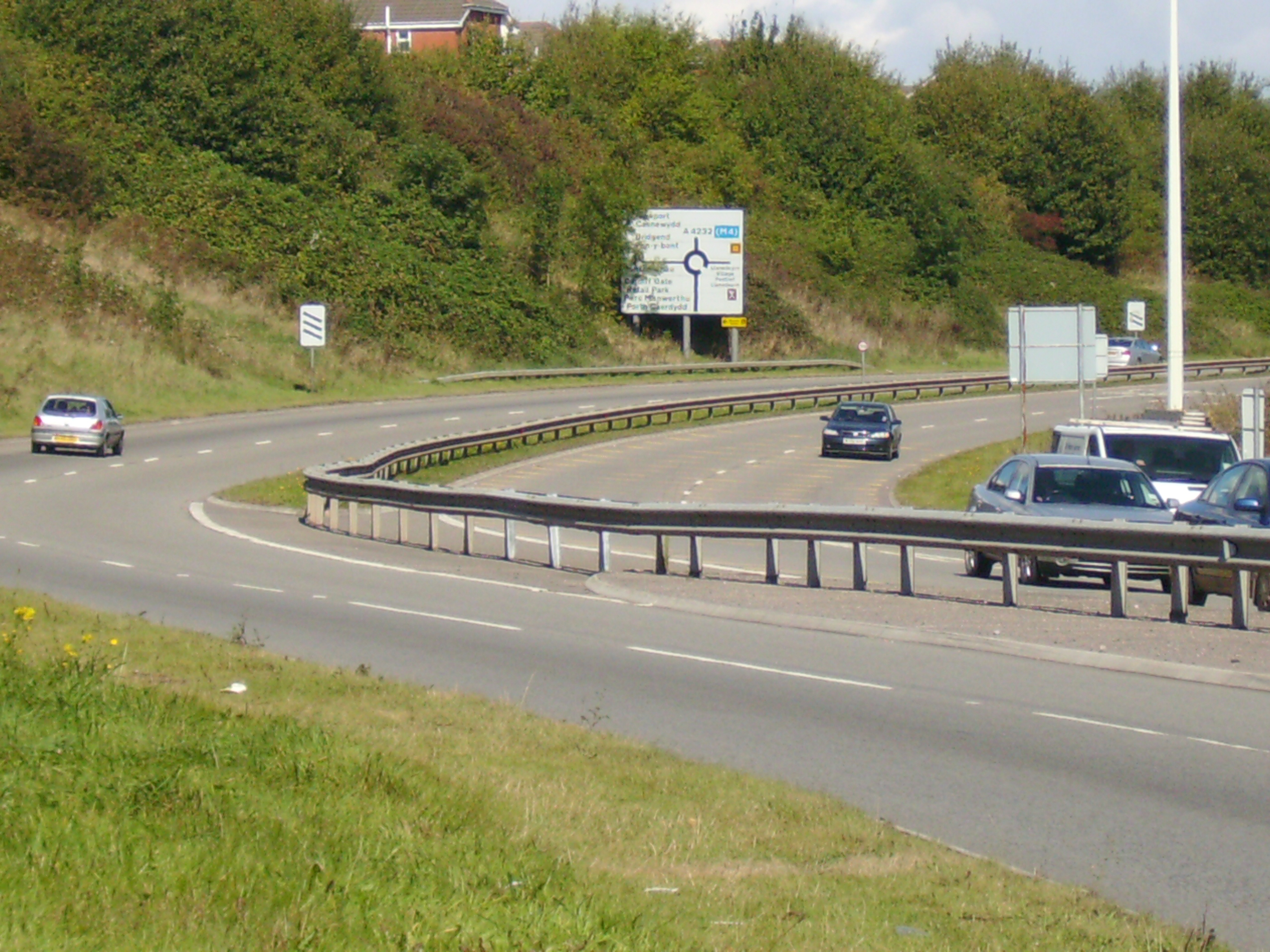
The A4232 Pentwyn Link Road marks the eastern edge of Pontprennau. View heading north towards Pontprennau roundabout, beyond which is the M4 motorway

Pontprennau has good transportation links, being located next to the M4 motorway junction 30. Public transport is provided by Cardiff Bus, which serves Pontprennau with services 57 and 58, with buses running approximately every 7–8 minutes during peak time, taking around 40 minutes to reach Cardiff City Centre via Pentwyn, Llanedeyrn, Penylan and Roath. Services 51 and 53 run through west and central Pontprenau to the city centre via the Heath Hospital, and the 52 service stops near west Pontprenau, running to the city centre approximately every half hour via Cyncoed, Penylan and Roath. Additionally Adventure Travel operates the C1 bus, running from Cardiff Gate in East Pontprennau to Culverhouse Cross via the city centre.

On the council's bicycle network plan, Pontprennau is linked directly to the city centre via onroad routes via Pentwyn. However, to the south a gravel trail path runs along the flood plain of the Rhymney River on the Llanrumney side of the A48 link road, which is easily accessible via tarmac paths which run north–south within the Pontprennau community. The Rhymney River trail gives both walkers and cyclists easy access to the Newport Road both west and east of Llanrumney, and hence via the eastern entrance through Llanrumney Bowls club to the extensive retail park on Newport Road West.

== Sport ==
The field is the home of the "Pontprennau Pumas", the local football team, running two adult teams in the Cardiff Combination Leagues. They also have teams at under 12's and under 11's. The club are sponsored by Cardiff Gate Business Park. Pontprennau Community Centre playing fields (allocated to the school, but open for community use) provides one of many "green-grass-expanse" family activity areas within the community, and a standard sized football field.

== Local services ==
Community Centre

- Pontprennau Community Education Centre, Heol Pontprennau, Pontprennau.

Church

- The Bridge Church- Pontprennau, an evangelical church meeting in Pontprennau Primary School (www.bridgechurchcardiff.org)
- Pontprennau Community Church, an ecumenical church, served through the Cardiff east ministry area

Library

- There is no library located in Pontprennau, but a mobile library service visits once a week.

Parks & Play Areas

- Lascelles Park - Park and children's play area
- Pontprennau Playing Fields - Playing fields and basketball ball court (Hoel Pontprennau)
- Crawford Drive - Park and children's play area, leading to the Rhymney River Trail
- Butterfield Park - Park and children's play area
- Peppermint Park - Park and children's play area

== Local Council ==
Cardiff Council the local authority which covers Pontprennau, the main council offices are at County Hall, Atlantic Wharf, Cardiff.

=== Representation ===
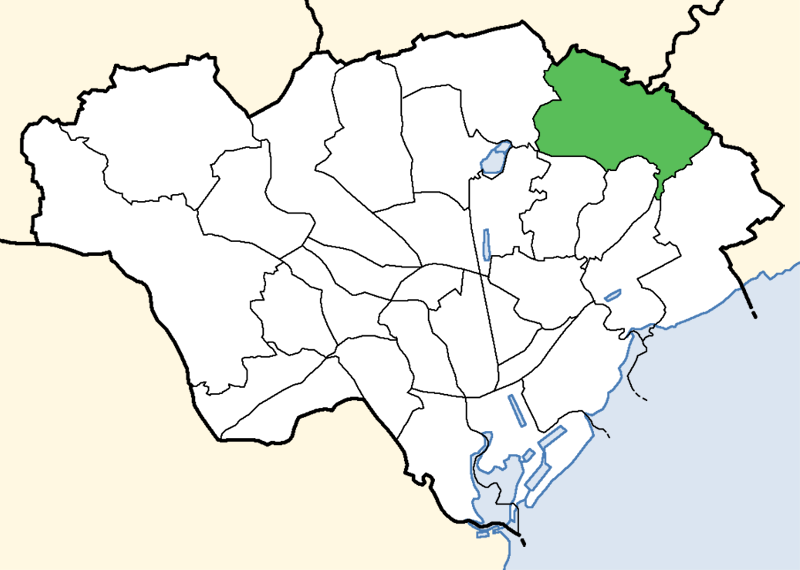
Pontprennau & Old St Mellons ward

Pontprennau is a community of the City of Cardiff but there is no community council for the area.

Pontprennau & Old St. Mellons is an electoral division located in the North East of Cardiff. It is represented by Dianne Rees of the Welsh Conservative Party, and Georgina Phillips of Welsh Labour.

== Government ==
=== Senedd ===
Pontprennau is in the Cardiff North constituency for the Senedd, represented by Julie Morgan MS, a member of the Welsh Labour Party.

=== Westminster ===
Cardiff North has been represented since 2017 by Anna McMorrin MP, a member of the Labour Party.
