= A4232 road =

Road in Cardiff, Wales

A4232

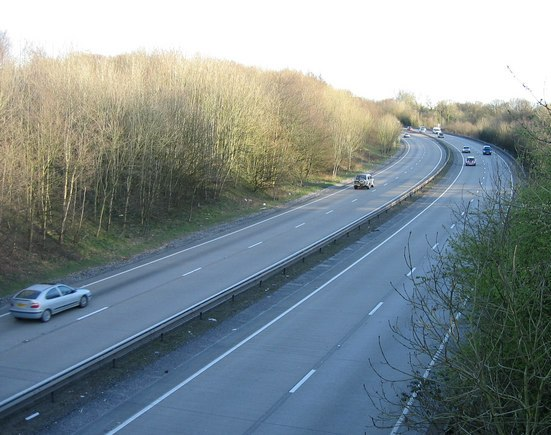

Route information
- Maintained by South Wales Trunk Road Agent (Capel Llanilltern – Culverhouse Cross Link Road) and Cardiff Council (all other Link Roads)
- Length: 17.4 mi (28.0 km)
- Existed: 1978–present
- History: Constructed 1978–2017

Major junctions
- West end: M4 (J33)
- A48 A4050 A4055 A4234 A4161; A48
- East end: M4 (J30)

Location
- Country: United Kingdom
- Primary destinations: Cardiff

Road network
- Roads in the United Kingdom; Motorways; A and B road zones

The A4232, which is also known either as the Peripheral Distributor Road (PDR) (Welsh: Ffordd Ddosbarthu Ymylol) or the Cardiff Link Road (Welsh: Ffordd Gyswllt Caerdydd), is a distributor road in Cardiff, the capital of Wales.

The first section of the PDR to be completed was the Southern Way Link Road in 1978 and the latest section was phase 1 of the Eastern Bay Link Road, known as Ewart Parkinson Road in 2017. When fully completed, the road will form part of the Cardiff ring road system. The PDR runs west, south and east of Cardiff, with the M4 between junction 30 and junction 33 completing the northern section. The PDR is dual carriageway for its entire length except for Rover Way and the East Moors Viaduct, which is a single carriageway. The entire length of the road has clearway restrictions on it.

The PDR has been constructed in separate link roads of between 1.2 km (0.75 mi) and 5.47 km (3.40 mi) around Cardiff and to date 17.4 miles (28.0 km) including spurs have been opened to traffic, with plans for a further 5.53 km (3.44 mi). It has 5 large viaducts (Ely Viaduct, Grangetown Viaduct, Taff Viaduct, Eastern Bay Link Viaduct and the East Moors Viaduct), 1 tunnel (Queen's Gate Tunnel) and 2 spur roads (Cogan Spur and Central Link Road). The road has many grade separated interchanges.

The section of the road between Junction 33 of the M4 and A48 at Culverhouse Cross is designated a trunk road in Wales and it's managed and maintained by the South Wales Trunk Road Agent. The remainder of the road is the responsibility of Cardiff Council.

== History ==
The road was conceived in the early 1970s, and planning by South Glamorgan County Council began in the late 1970s. At that stage the road was planned to be completed by 1995 and would relieve Ely, Grangetown, Butetown and East Moors of through traffic and provide a fast link to the national motorway network via the M4 and A48(M). The first section of the PDR to be completed was the Southern Way Link Road between Newport Road (A4161 road) and the Eastern Avenue (A48 road) in 1978 and the last section of the PDR, the first phase of the Eastern Bay Link Road, which was opened to the public in June 2017.

The former chairman of the South Glamorgan County Council environment committee, Councillor Paddy Kitson, called the road a "necklace of opportunity" due to its shape and also the opportunities for regeneration. By 1 April 1996 the responsibility for the road was transferred from South Glamorgan County Council to the unitary authority of Cardiff Council. Much of the funding for the road had been grant aided from the European Community and the UK Government on the basis that it would improve the economic viability of the area and bring in new jobs and industry. However, since the completion of the Butetown Link Road, funding for further developments have been at a standstill, and to date 22 kilometres (14 mi) including spurs are open to traffic with plans for a further 5.53 km (3.44 mi). The "missing link", the second and final phase of the Eastern Bay Link Road, is still to be built.

== Route description ==
The PDR has 3 separate sections: the Capel Llanilltern Interchange (M4 J33) to the Ocean Way roundabout, the Lamby Way roundabout to the Llanedeyrn Interchange (A48) and the Pontprennau Interchange (A48) to the Pentwyn Interchange (M4 J30).

The section from the Capel Llanilltern Interchange on the M4 (junction 33) to the Ocean Way roundabout is sometimes referred to as the Western Link Road (Welsh: Ffordd Gyswllt Gorllewin), is 15.77 kilometres (9.80 mi) in length and includes the Capel Llanilltern – Culverhouse Cross Link Road, Ely Link Road, Grangetown Link Road and Butetown Link Road. For the majority of this section it is the boundary between the City of Cardiff to the east and the Vale of Glamorgan to the west.

A4232 (Trunk Road)
Clockwise exits	Junction / Interchange	Anti-Clockwise exits
Bridgend, Newport, M4; Exit only	M4 J33; Capel Llanilltern Interchange; Cardiff West services	Start of A4232 (trunk road)
No access or exit	St. Fagans	Museum of Welsh Life
Start of A4232 (trunk road)	Culverhouse Cross	A48 (W) Cardiff West; A48 (E); Barry; A4050 Cardiff Airport
A4232
Clockwise exits	Junction / Interchange	Anti-Clockwise exits
A48 (W) Cardiff West; A48 (E); A4050 Cardiff Airport; Barry	Culverhouse Cross	Start of A4232
B4267, Industrial area, Athletics Stadium; Park and Ride	Leckwith	B4267, Industrial area, Athletics Stadium; Cardiff City Stadium
A4055, Barry, Penarth	Ferry Road	A4055, Barry, Penarth
No Exit	Stuart Street	Techniquest Museum No access
Queen's Gate Tunnel
A4234, City centre Porth Teigr, Docks; Atlantic Wharf, Porth Teigr; Cardiff Bay, Capital Waterside	Queen's Gate roundabout	A4234, City centre Docks, Atlantic Wharf; Porth Teigr, Cardiff Bay; Capital Waterside, County Hall
Start of A4232	Ocean Way roundabout	Ocean Park, Castle Works, Docks; End of A4232
Ocean Way roundabout to the Lamby Way / Rover Way roundabout (phase 2 of the Eastern Bay Link Road)
1.000 mi = 1.609 km; 1.000 km = 0.621 mi: Incomplete access; Proposed

This section partly opened in 1978, from the Lamby Way roundabout to the Llanedeyrn Interchange on the A48, is the oldest section of the PDR. It includes only the Southern Way Link Road, known locally as Southern Way, and is 2.25 km (1.40 mi) in length.

A4232
Clockwise exits	Junction / Interchange	Anti-Clockwise exits
Lamby Way, Rover Way; End of A4232	Lamby Way / Rover Way roundabout	Start of A4232
A4161, City centre Exit only	Southern Way	Access only
Start of A4232	A48 Llanedeyrn	A48, Newport, City Centre; End of A4232
A48
1.000 mi = 1.609 km; 1.000 km = 0.621 mi: Concurrency terminus; Incomplete access

The Pentwyn Link Road section from the Pontprennau Interchange on the A48 to the Pentwyn Interchange on the M4 (junction 30) is one of the newer sections of the PDR, having been opened in 1994; it is 1.61 km (1.00 mi) in length. The road between the Llanedeyrn Interchange to the Pontprennau Interchange is the A48 (Eastern Avenue); it too is a dual carriageway and is a concurrent road with the PDR; there are no plans to renumber this section of the A48.

A4232
Clockwise exits	Junction / Interchange	Anti-Clockwise exits
A48
A48	A48 Pontprennau	Start of A4232
Pontprennau, Cardiff Gate Retail Park, Llanedeyrn Village	Heol Pontprennau roundabout	Pontprennau, Cardiff Gate Retail Park, Llanedeyrn Village
Start of A4232	M4 J30; Pentwyn Interchange; Cardiff Gate services	Bridgend, Newport, M4; Rudry, Draethen; End of A4232
1.000 mi = 1.609 km; 1.000 km = 0.621 mi: Concurrency terminus

== Link roads ==
A map of all the link roads and spur roads can be seen by clicking Map of all coordinates opposite

Each section of the road was completed in separate link roads.

=== Capel Llanilltern – Culverhouse Cross Link Road ===
Capel Llanilltern – Culverhouse Cross Link Road

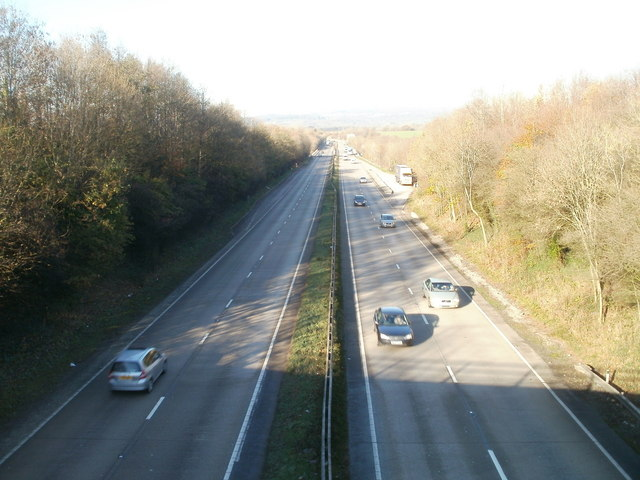
Looking north towards the M4

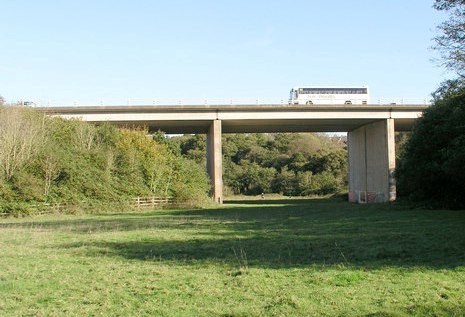
Ely Viaduct

The £14.5 million Capel Llanilltern – Culverhouse Cross Link Road (Welsh: Ffordd Gyswllt Capel Llanilltern – Croes Cwrlwys), also known as the A4232 Trunk Road (as it is the only section of the PDR which is a trunk road), between the Capel Llanilltern Interchange (51.506481°N 3.310425°W) and the Culverhouse Cross Interchange (51.466350°N 3.271110°W) was opened in 1985. It was designed to provide a by-pass for traffic from the M4 to the Vale of Glamorgan. It is 5.47 km (3.40 mi) in length and includes the Ely Viaduct close to Michaelston-super-Ely. The trunk road is maintained by the South Wales Trunk Road Agency (SWTRA) on behalf of the Welsh Government. The remainder of the PDR is a primary route, which is maintained by Cardiff Council. In 2006 variable message signs were installed on the Capel Llanilltern – Culverhouse Cross Link Road by Techspan Systems to display warning messages about road and weather conditions, accidents, congestion and major events in the area.

Ely Viaduct

The Ely Viaduct (Welsh: Traphont Trelái) crosses over the River Ely and also the main South Wales railway line.

The viaduct is a 538 ft (164 m) twin-box girder and has central span of 230 ft (70 m) and 150 ft (46 m) side spans, constructed by the balanced cantilever method. It was constructed in segments, each weighing between 54 tons for plain segments and 93 tons for the main segments.

=== Ely Link Road ===
The Ely Link Road (Welsh: Ffordd Gyswllt Trelái) between the Culverhouse Cross Interchange (51.465840°N 3.269895°W) and the Leckwith Interchange (51.470641°N 3.211762°W), sometimes referred to as the Leckwith Road Interchange. It is 4.83 km (3.00 mi) in length and was opened in 1982 and built by Davies Middleton & Davies Ltd (DMD). It was designed to relieve Ely of through traffic and partly cuts into Leckwith Hill.

=== Grangetown Link Road ===
Grangetown Link Road

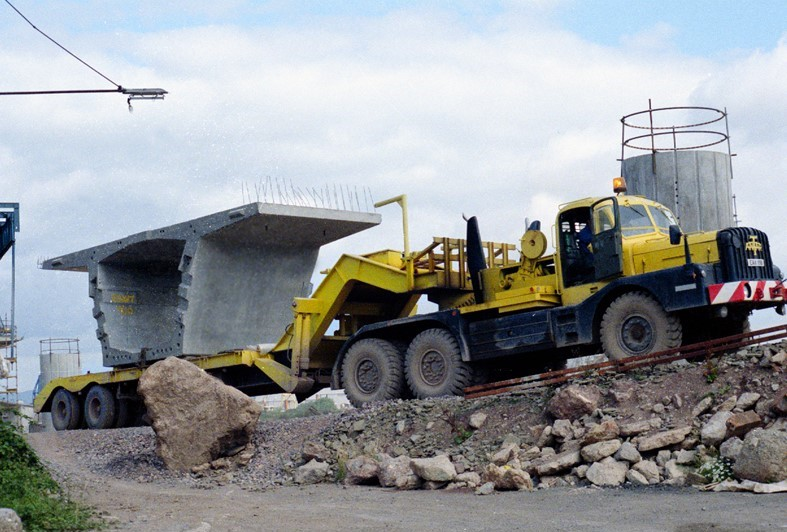
A segment being transported ready for gluing

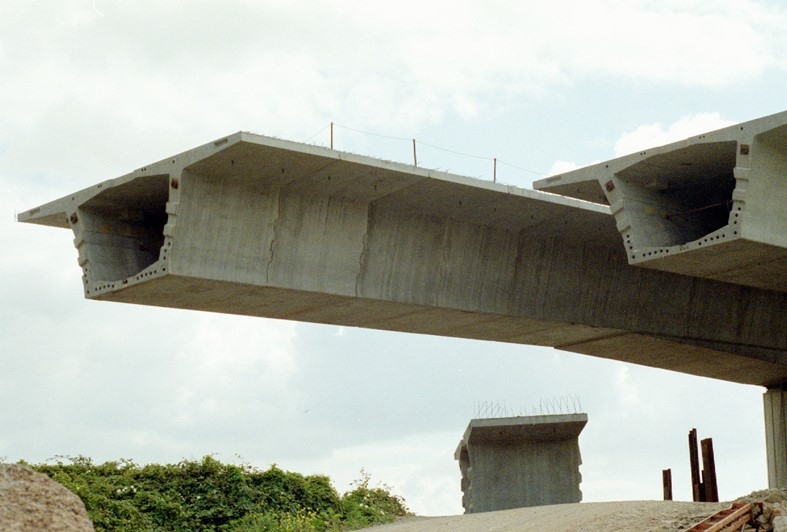
Construction of the Grangetown Viaduct

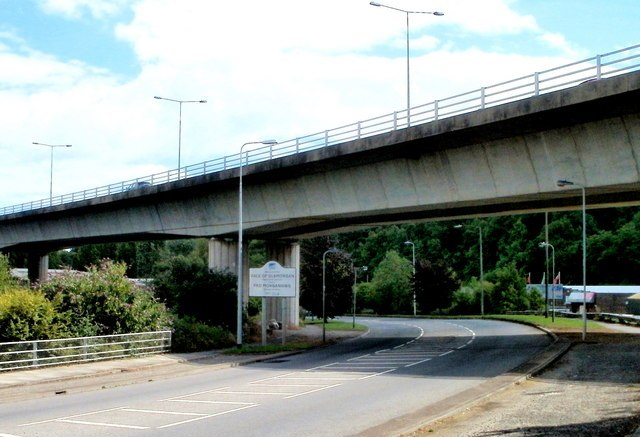
Grangetown Viaduct over Penarth Road (A4160)

The 2.89 km (1.80 mi) Grangetown Link Road (Welsh: Ffordd Gyswllt Trelluest) between the Leckwith Interchange (51.470159°N 3.211239°W) and the Ferry Road Interchange (51.453510°N 3.185760°W) was opened on 3 May 1988. It includes the Grangetown Viaduct.

Grangetown Viaduct

The Grangetown Viaduct (Welsh: Traphont Trelluest) is approximately 1 km (0.62 mi) in length and is said to be the longest glued segmental bridge in the United Kingdom. It has 13 spans of 71 meters (233 ft) with 2 end spans of 38 m (125 ft) and 46 m (151 ft).

The viaduct was designed by South Glamorgan County Council. Robert Benaim and Associates, now called Benaim UK Ltd designed the initial launching system for the glued segmental structure.

=== Butetown Link Road ===
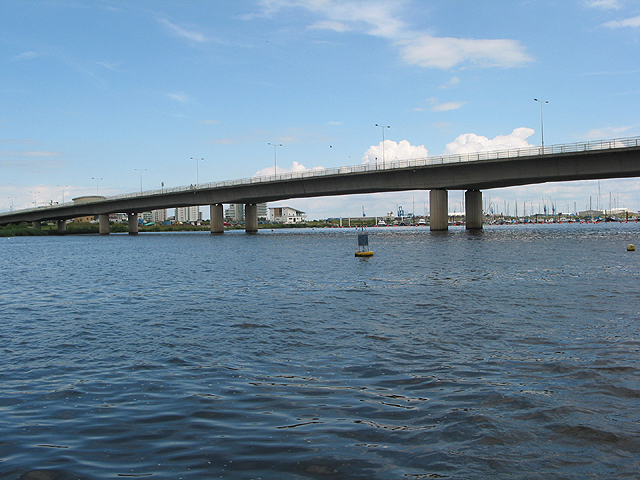
Butetown Link Road's Taff Viaduct, crossing the River Taff before entering the Queen's Gate Tunnel to the left

The 2.57 km (1.60 mi) Butetown Link Road (Welsh: Ffordd Gyswllt Butetown) between the Ferry Road Interchange (51.453585°N 3.184044°W) and the Queen's Gate Roundabout (51.467873°N 3.157455°W) was opened on 27 March 1995 by Neil Kinnock at the time the European Commissioner for Transport. Construction of the link road commenced on 15 October 1993 and it was the last link road to be built before the Eastern Bay Link Road opened in 2017. It includes the Taff Viaduct, also known as the Butetown Link Road Bridge, and the Queen's Gate Tunnel, which is also known simply as the Butetown Tunnel.

In 1987 South Glamorgan County Council had intended to build a viaduct across the River Taff and then go onto an elevated section through Butetown "on stilts". But the newly formed Cardiff Bay Development Corporation along with local residents objected to the scheme that they said would cut through Butetown and split the community, creating an unnecessary physical barrier between the two areas to the north and south of the link road. By 1988 South Glamorgan County Council had agreed to change the design of the link road, despite having already spent 6 years of design work on the link road meant that a tunnel had to be built instead. The cost of the Butetown Link Road was estimated to cost £35 million, but this had risen to £45M in 1988, before the design change.

The contract to build the Butetown Link Road was eventually won by a local company Davies Middleton & Davies Ltd in a joint venture with an Italian contractor, Cogefar-Impressit UK Ltd. The bid of £60 million undercut all other bids by £10 million, Davies Middleton & Davies Ltd subsequently went into administrative receivership.

Queen's Gate Tunnel

Queen's Gate Tunnel

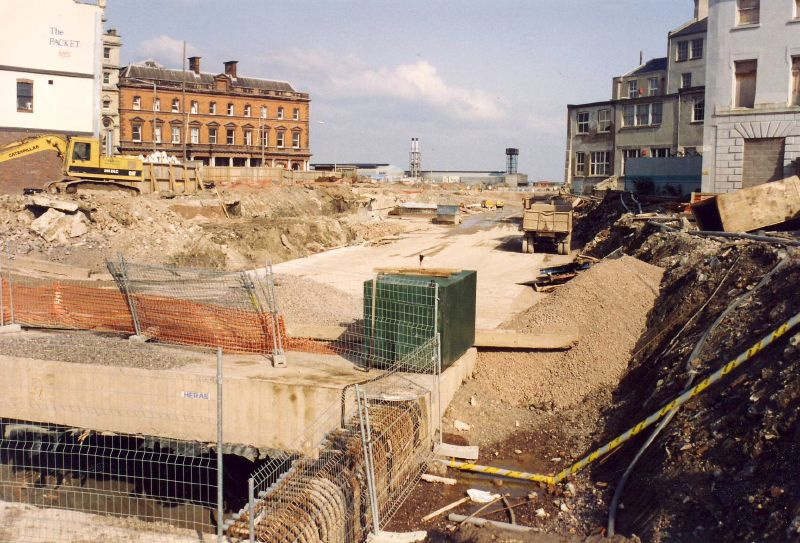
During construction in the "cover" phase of the "cut and cover" method of construction

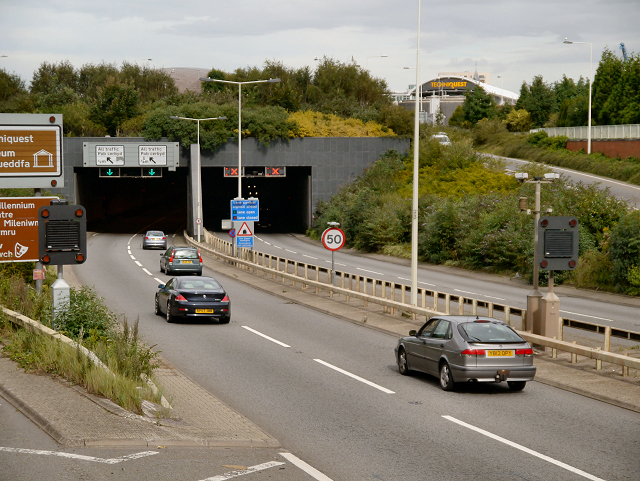
The western entrance and exit of the tunnel

The Queen's Gate Tunnel (Welsh: Twnnel Porth y Frenhines), also known as the Butetown Tunnel, is underneath southern Butetown and follows a line underneath the Wales Millennium Centre. The 715 m (2,346 ft) twin tunnel was constructed using the cut and cover method of construction, which involves digging a trench for the tunnel and then roofing it over. The tunnel was constructed using reinforced concrete and a central wall separates the two sets of traffic.

South Glamorgan County Council originally awarded the contract for the management, installation, testing and commissioning of all electrical and mechanical services for the tunnel, and the water pumping stations to EI·WHS Ltd. They still maintain the tunnel on behalf of Cardiff Council.

Immediately to the east of the tunnels is an unfinished viaduct which had been built to continue over Queen's Gate Roundabout to link up with the next section. The viaduct will not be completed during the 2016-2017 construction of the Eastern Bay Link road, but remains available for future development.

Taff Viaduct

Taff Viaduct

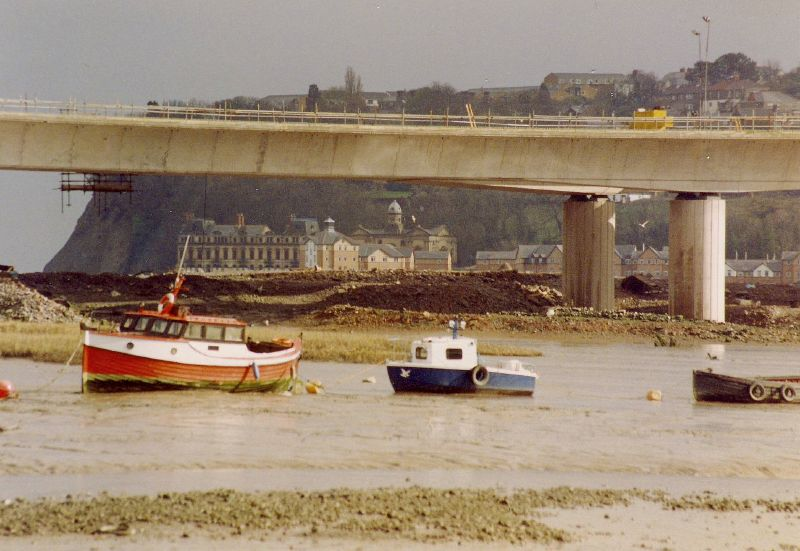
During construction

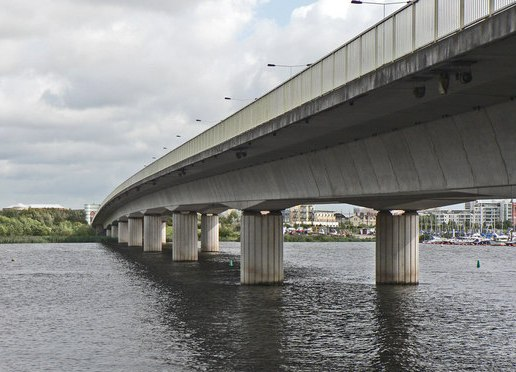
Spanning the River Taff

Construction of the 600 m (2,000 ft) Taff Viaduct (Welsh: Traphont Tâf) includes a dual-carriageway roadway plus a foot and cycle path. South Glamorgan County Council was the local authority in charge of the project at the time and construction of the viaduct began in March 1991. The Taff Viaduct crosses the River Taff at Cardiff Bay and is known locally as Pollinger Bridge.

The viaduct was constructed using precast concrete segments, which is widely used in the construction industry for medium to long span viaducts. Segments were made in a casting yard near the site and then transported for final assembly of the viaduct.

=== Eastern Bay Link Road ===
Eastern Bay Link Road
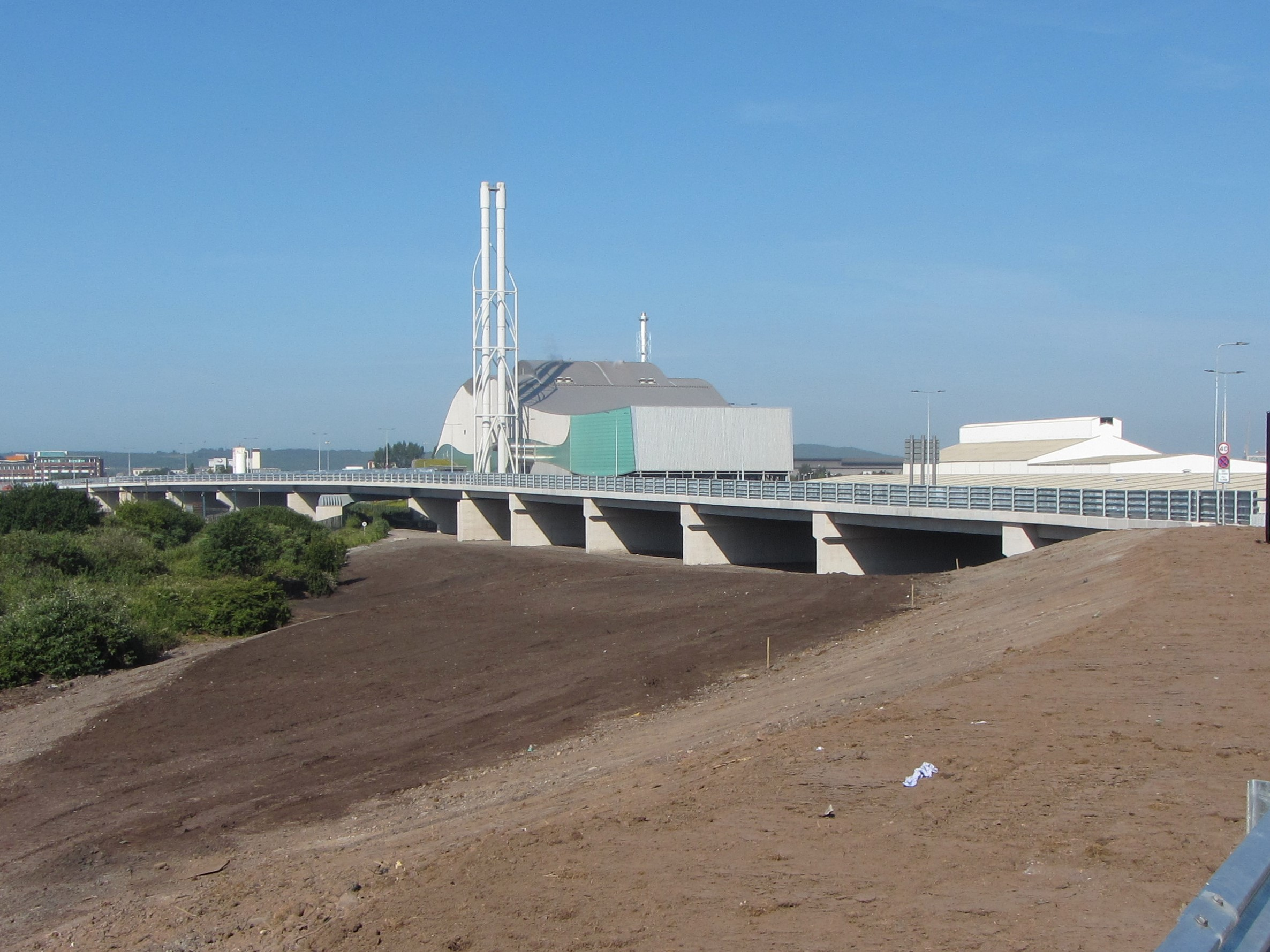
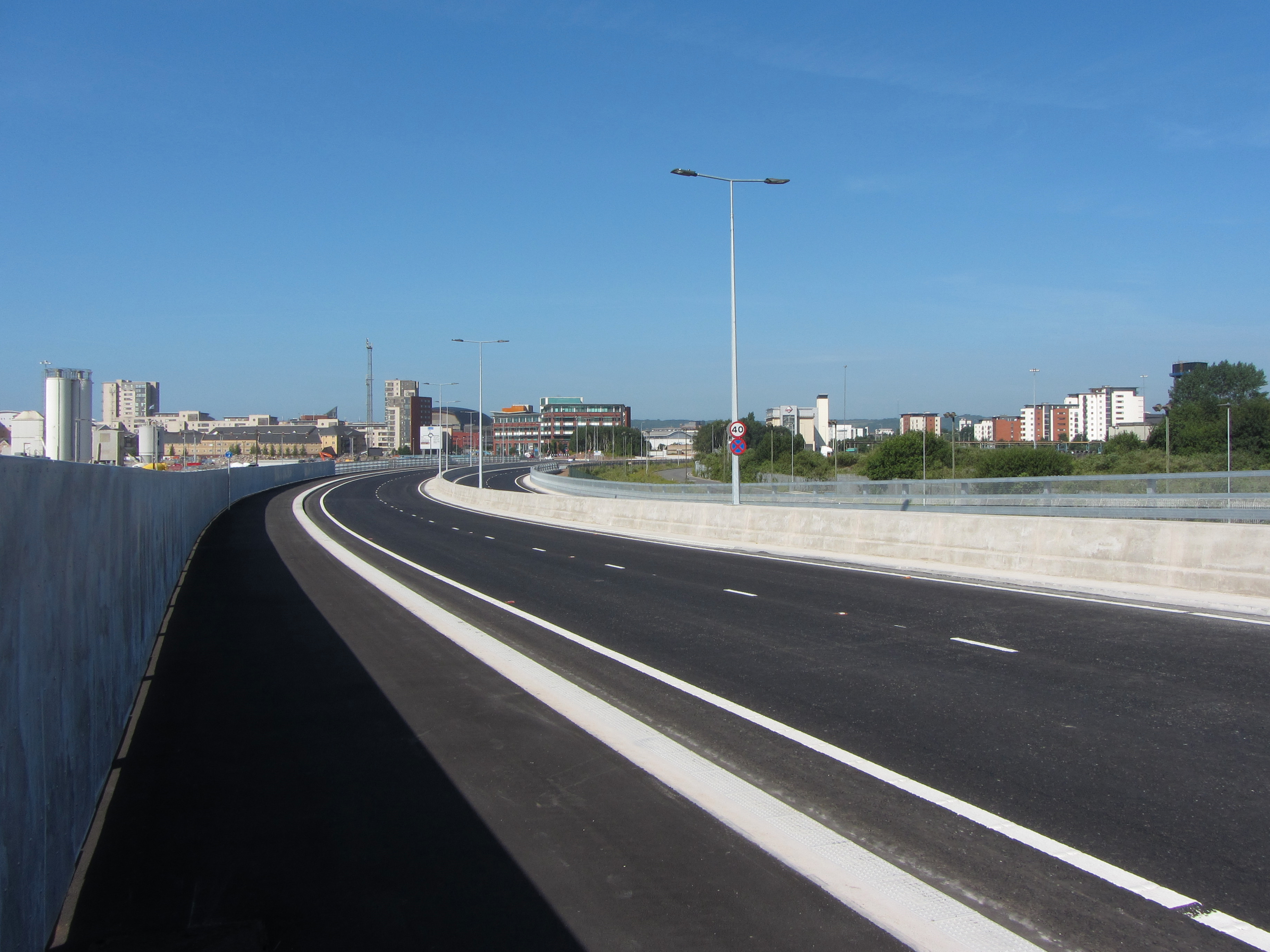

Construction on the first phase of the 5.25 km (3.26 mi) Eastern Bay Link Road (Welsh: Ffordd Gyswllt Dwyrain y Bae), also known as the Ewart Parkinson Road (Welsh: Ffordd Ewart Parkinson), began on 17 March 2016. It runs from the Queen's Gate Roundabout to the Ocean Way roundabout and was opened on 15 June 2017 by the First Minister of Wales Carwyn Jones. Only phase 1 of the 1.2 km (0.75 mi) road between Queen's Gate Roundabout (51.468090°N 3.156193°W) and Ocean Way Interchange (51.472328°N 3.144107°W) has been constructed, with a feasibility study being carried out into the final phase (Phase 2) of the link road between Ocean Way roundabout to the A48 Eastern Avenue. The link road is a two lane dual carriageway with a 50 miles per hour (80 km/h) speed limit eastbound and a 40 miles per hour (64 km/h) speed limit westbound. Originally the link road was to have just a 180 m (590 ft) with embankments at both ends of the link road, however because a sewer could not be diverted, a 670 m (2,200 ft) viaduct had to be built instead, which caused delays to the construction. The viaduct was constructed using steel and concrete and consists of 21 spans with 120 precast concrete beams and 220 m (720 ft) of steelwork.

Phase 1 of the Eastern Bay Link Road

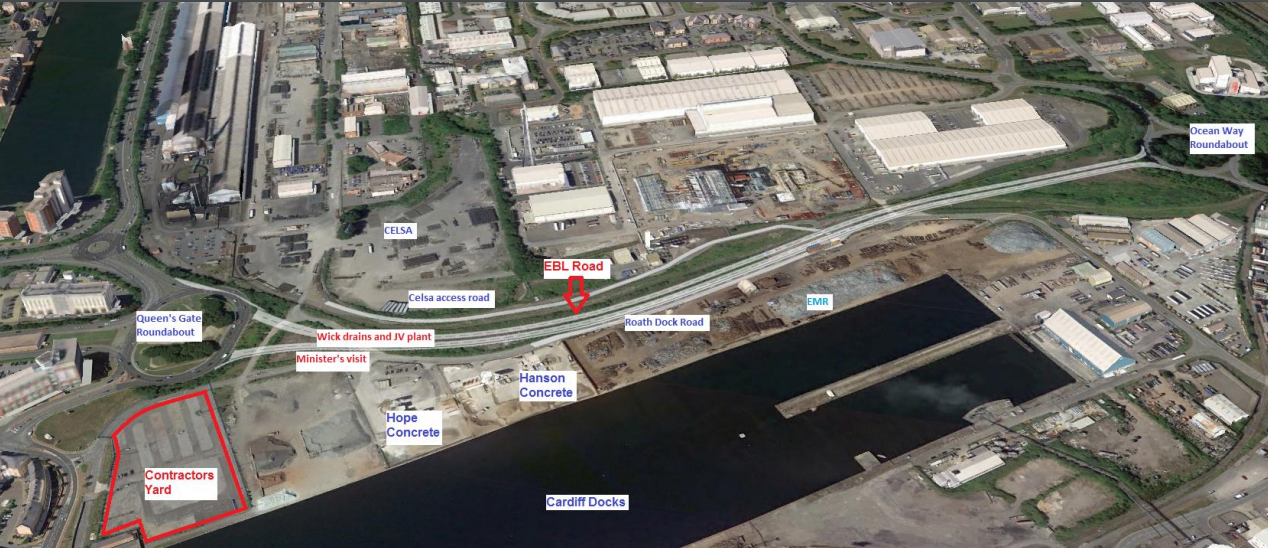
The route of Phase 1 of the Eastern Bay Link Road. The western end (left) is Queen's Gate roundabout, the eastern end is (right) is Ocean Way roundabout

For many years this link road had been mothballed due to the costs involved. The link road had previously been known as the East Moors Link Road – Phase 1 and 3, but it also included the East Moors Viaduct, which was originally known as the East Moors Link Road – Phase 2. Later it became known as the Cardiff Bay Link Road, then renamed again becoming the Eastern Bay Link Road.

The Eastern Bay Link Road was subject to many planning proposals since the last link road (the Butetown Link Road) was completed in 1995, namely a local transport plan (Local Transport Plan 2000–2016) in August 2000, a green paper (A Change of Gear) in December 2002 and a white paper (Keeping Cardiff Moving) in May 2003. The cost of the link road was estimated to cost £162 million in 2001 and this increased to £180 million by August 2002. It was suggested that it could be paid for by congestion charging, although a public-private partnership was also considered.

The original route of the link road had been challenged by both Friends of the Earth Cymru, and also the Royal Society for the Protection of Birds (RSPB), who had both lodged formal objections against the link road.

The new route would be different from the earlier proposal and would avoid any encroachment into the nature conservation area, which Friends of the Earth and the RSPB had objected to. The new route would ensure that there would be no objections.

It was revealed on 14 June 2013 that Edwina Hart, Minister for Economy, Science and Transport in the Welsh Government supported the completion the Eastern Bay Link Road. She said that the link road would; improve access to Cardiff Bay, improve access to the Cardiff Central Enterprise Zone and enhance connections within the Cardiff City Region. The overall objectives of the road would be to:

- Increase accessibility from east Cardiff to major employment sites in the East Moors area, Cardiff Bay and the Central Cardiff Enterprise Zone
- Provide a more direct route between the Butetown Tunnel and Rover Way
- Reduce congestion at the junctions on Tyndall Street by removing traffic currently using the Ocean Way- East Tyndall Street – Central Link route
- Reduce journey times for private and commercial road users
- Help economic regeneration
- Enhance road safety and reduce casualties
- Improve resilience on the strategic road network around Cardiff
- Provide more opportunities for cycling and walking

Phase 1 (Ewart Parkinson Road)

Construction of phase 1 of the Eastern Bay Link Road

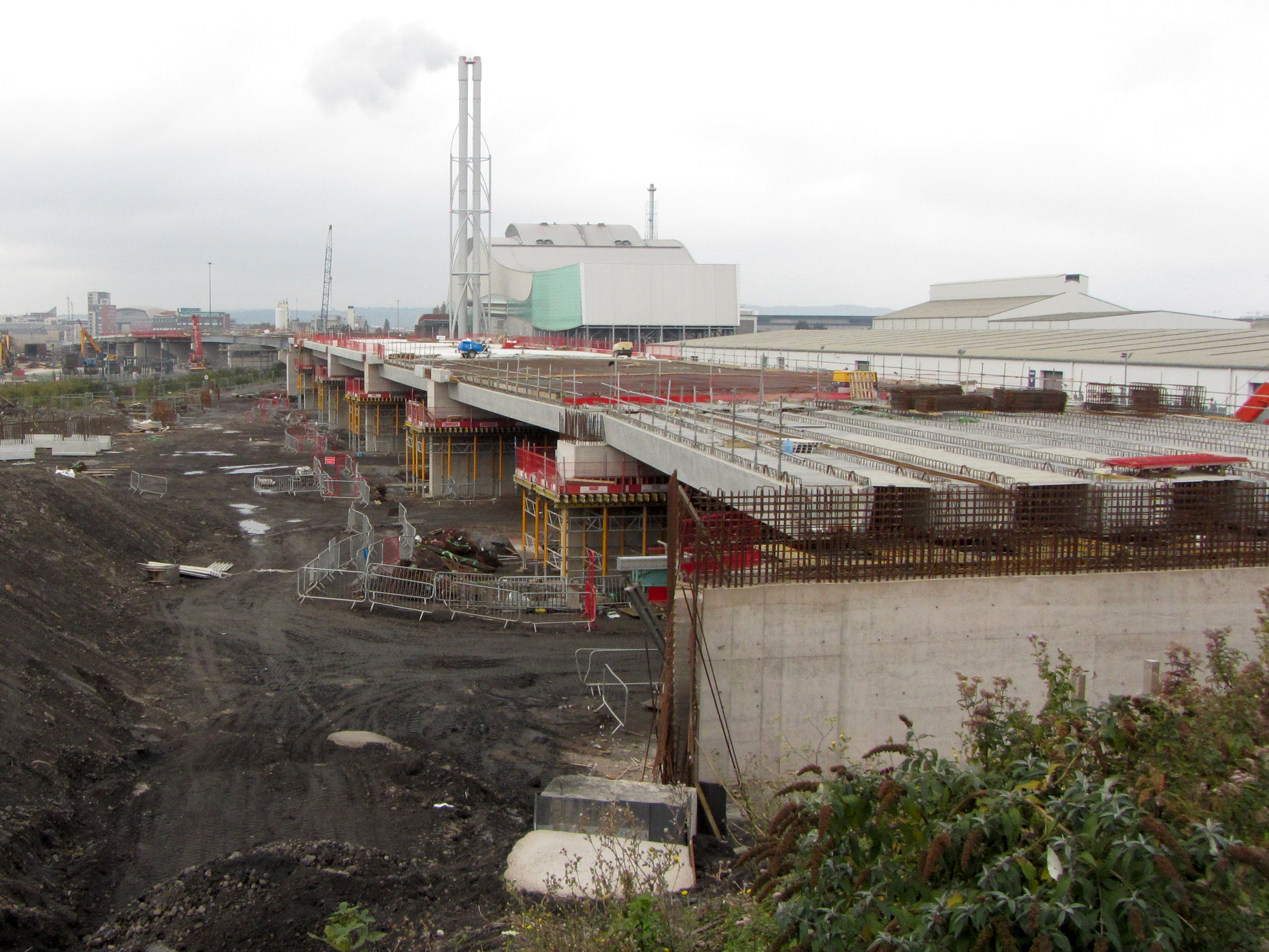
During construction looking west towards Queens Gate roundabout (October 2016)

Drone footage of the Eastern Bay Link in 2017

On 2 May 2014, Edwina Hart approved the procurement of the design–build contractor, advance service diversion works and communications arrangements for the Eastern Bay Link Road. In April 2015, it was announced by the Welsh Government that the 1.2 km (0.75 mi) £27.3m Eastern Bay Link Road from the Queens Gate roundabout to the Ocean Way roundabout at Tremorfa known as the "roundabout to nowhere", would be designed by Capita Property and Infrastructure with Cass Hayward being the specialist bridge designer. It was constructed by Dawnus and Ferrovial Agroman UK in a joint venture. Construction began on Phase 1 of the link road on 17 March 2016, This phase of the road was opened on Thursday 15 June 2017 by the First Minister of Wales Carwyn Jones.

Phase 2

It was reported on 9 December 2016 by Cardiff Council that a feasibility study into Phase 2 between the Ocean Way roundabout to the A48 Eastern Avenue would take place and would be funded by the Welsh Government, as will all the construction costs for Phase 2. Extending the link road 5 km (3.1 mi) from Ocean Way roundabout to the A48 (via the Southern Way Link Road) could take between three and five years to complete.

On 21 October 2021, Huw Thomas, leader of Cardiff Council said:

Only a kilometre of new road has been built in Cardiff since devolution. I think there is a compelling case to be made in particular around the Eastern Bay Link, completing from the Queensgate roundabout eastwards to the end of Rover Way to be upgraded. That's really important not just as a gateway to the city and Cardiff Bay, but as a way of diverting traffic away from residential areas including my own ward of Splott. On the Eastern Bay Link, conversations at an official level have been happening for some years now with a decent amount of detail. I will certainly be making representations, when I next meet the climate change minister and the deputy minister for transport, of the importance of that road.

From in October 2021 Arcadis conducted a WelTAG (Welsh Transport Planning Appraisal Guidance) Stage 1 study. The WelTAG study found that it would involve:

- Realignment of Rover Way between the A4232 Southern Way Roundabout and the Ocean Way / A4232 Eastern Bay Link Roundabout to accommodate extension of existing development;
- Modification of five junctions along Rover Way to prioritise strategic east–west movements: Ffordd Pengam (access to a Tesco store); Seawall Road; Tide Fields Road (access to Cardiff East waste treatment works); Darby Road (access to Tremorfa Industrial Estate); and Ocean Way (access to Cardiff Docks);
- Provision of an active travel route and crossing facilities.

On 14 February 2023, following a review of all new road building by the independent Roads Review Panel, the Welsh Government classified the link road as a 'local authority scheme' and would be considered for grant funding in the future if it met the Welsh Government's criteria, that being:

1. To support a modal shift (from one form of transportation to another) and reduce carbon emissions.
2. To improve safety through small-scale changes.
3. To adapt to the impacts of climate change.
4. To provide access and connectivity to jobs and centres of economic activity in a way that supports modal shift.

=== Southern Way Link Road ===
East Moors Viaduct
Southern Way Flyover
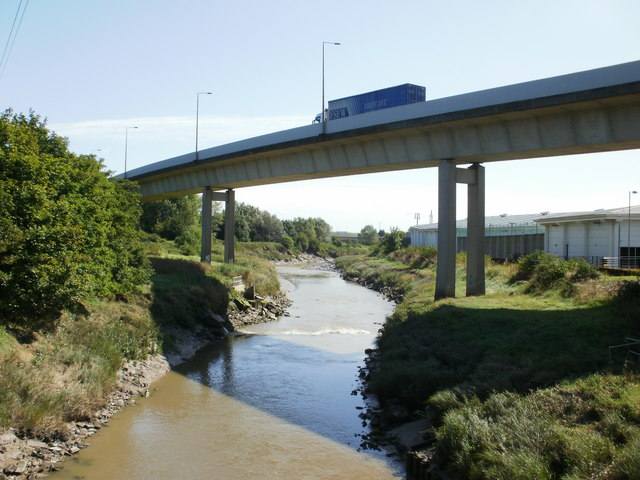
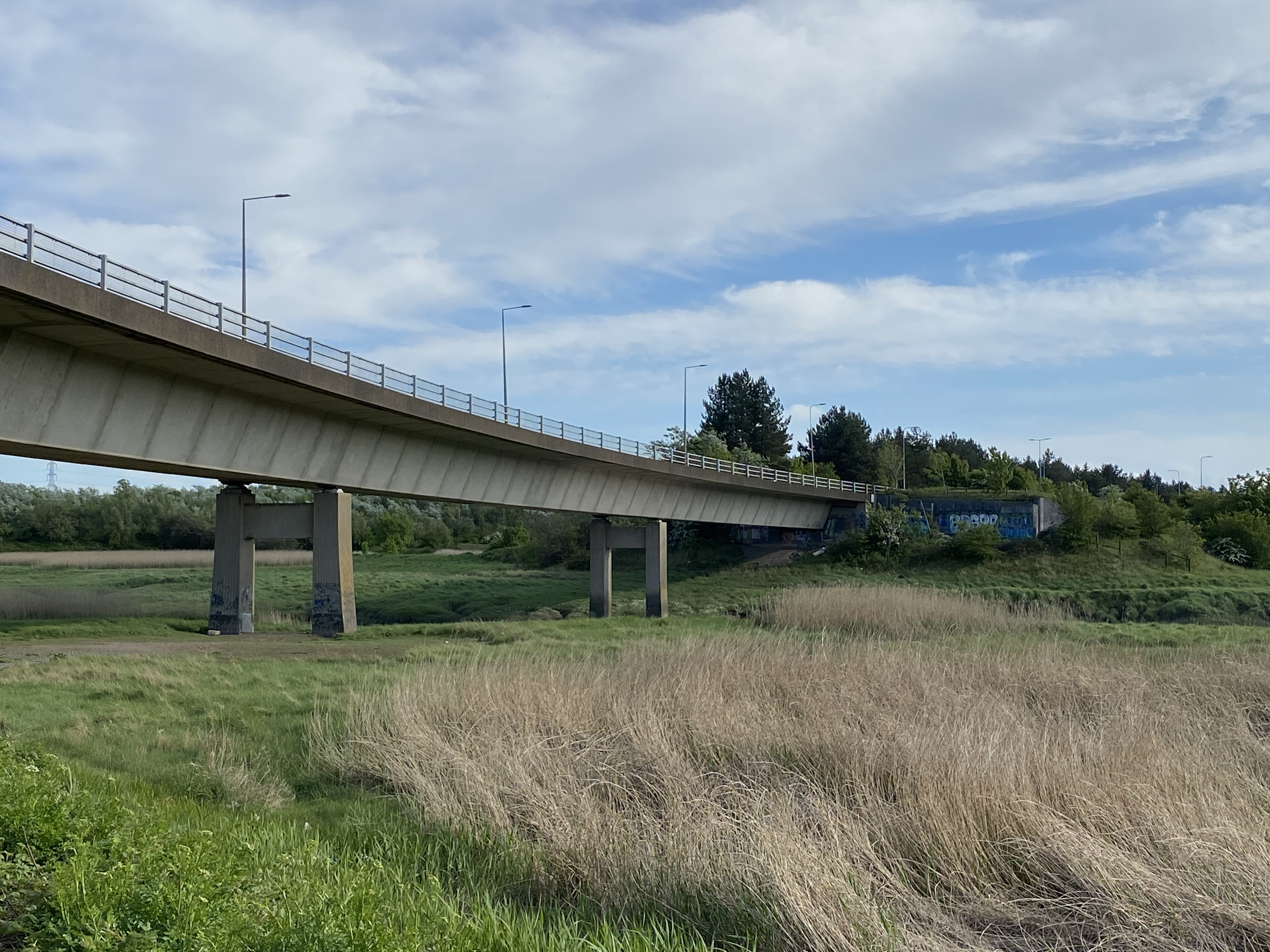

The Southern Way Link Road (Welsh: Ffordd Gyswllt y Ffordd Deheuol), generally known simply as Southern Way, was built in two parts; the first section of Southern Way to be completed was between Newport Road (A4161 road) and the Eastern Avenue (A48 road) in 1978. The final section of the link road was built between Newport Road and the Rover Way – Lamby Way roundabout and was opened in 1984 at a cost of £9 million and includes the East Moors Viaduct, which is also known as the Southern Way Flyover. In 1987 it was envisaged that the present single-carriage would be "twinned" as a dual-carriageway, the same as the rest of the PDR. The 2.25 km (1.40 mi) link road now runs from the Rover Way – Lamby Way Roundabout (51.493127°N 3.133759°W) to the Llanedeyrn Interchange (51.507202°N 3.145853°W) on the A48.

East Moors Viaduct

The 900 m (3,000 ft) East Moors Viaduct (Welsh: Traphont Rhostiroedd y Dwyrain), which is also known as the Southern Way Flyover, was also designed by Robert Benaim and Associates who won the ICE (Institution of Civil Engineers) Project Award and also a Concrete Society Commendation, both in 1985 for work on the viaduct. The viaduct was constructed by concrete box girder deck of segmental construction. The East Moors Viaduct was originally known as the East Moors Link Road – Phase 2, but now forms part of the Southern Way Link Road.

=== Pentwyn Link Road ===
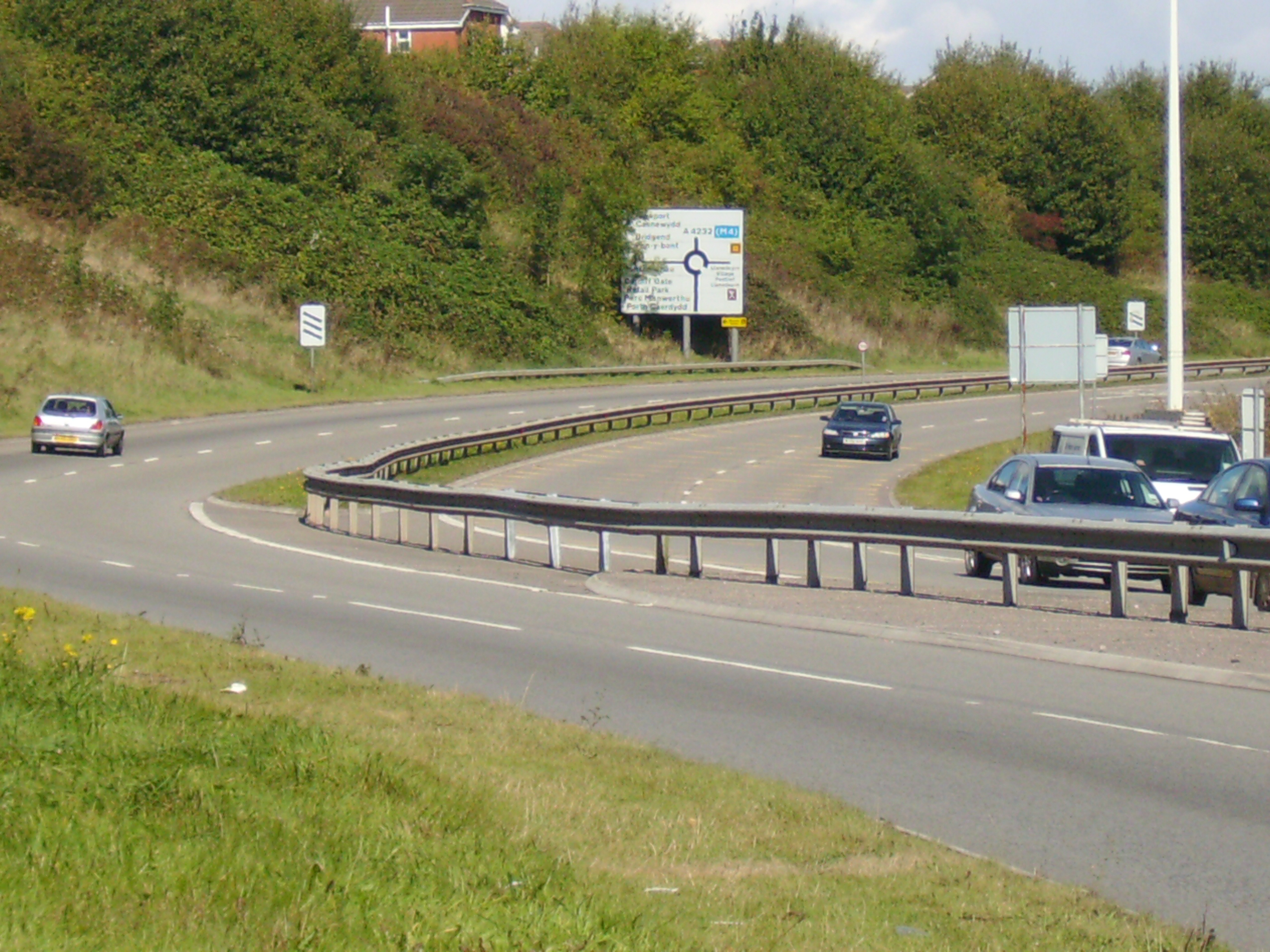
Looking north approaching the Pontprennau roundabout

The Pentwyn Link Road (Welsh: Ffordd Gyswllt Pentwyn), which is also known as the North Pentwyn Link Road and the Pontprennau Link Road, runs from the Pontprennau Interchange (51.528660°N 3.130240°W) on the A48 and the Pentwyn Interchange (51.541525°N 3.128749°W) on the M4 (junction 30). It is 1.61 km (1.00 mi) in length and was opened by John Redwood MP, the Secretary of State for Wales on 20 June 1994. It provides a link between the Eastern Avenue (A48) and the M4 so that westbound traffic from the east of the city can get onto the M4 without having to go through the city, via the A48 and A470. In addition it also provides access to the community of Pontprennau to the national road network. This link was financed by private developers as part of a large scale housing development at Pontprennau.

== Public Art & Commemorative Stones ==
Type	Image	Link Road	Location	Notes
Sculpture - A Private View		Butetown Link Road	Taff Viaduct (western end)	South Glamorgan County Council commissioned a sculpture by Kevin Atherton for the foot and cycle path on a specially constructed viewing platform. The work was to mark the completion of the Taff Viaduct so that the sculpture should be visible for the benefit of pedestrians, cyclist and motorists alike. It was unveiled in 1995.
Commemorative stone		Butetown Link Road / Eastern Bay Link Road (Phase 1)	Queen's Gate Roundabout	Stone marking the inauguration of Queen's Gate (Butetown Link Road) at the Queen's Gate roundabout on 15 October 1993.
Sculpture - Secret Station		Southern Way Link Road	Rover Way roundabout (south west of roundabout)	A sculpture by Eilis O'Connell, unveiled 1992. It was vandalised in early 2018 and remains in its bare state, with the mechanics of the light and smoke machine visible.
Commemorative stone		Pentwyn Link Road	Heol Pontprennau roundabout (south west of roundabout)	Stone marking the opening of the Pentwyn Link Road on 20 June 1994.

== Spur roads ==
=== Cogan Spur (A4055) ===
Cogan Viaduct
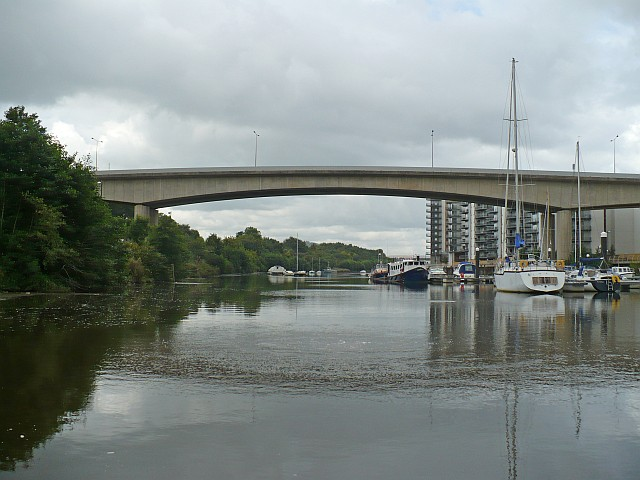
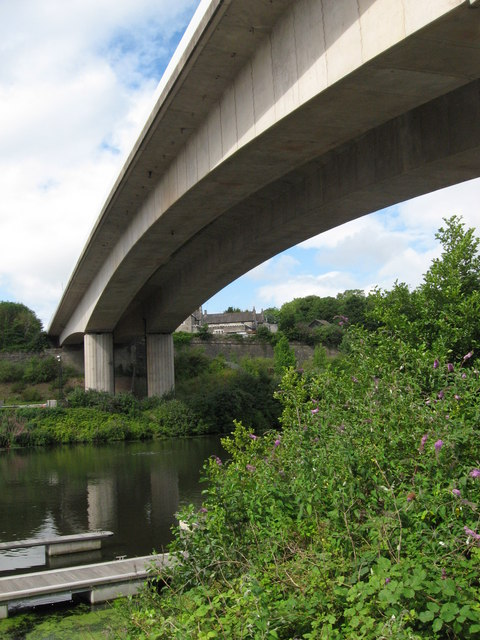

The Cogan Spur, which is also known as the Cogan Link (Welsh: Cyswllt Cogan), from the Ferry Road Interchange (51.453519°N 3.184876°W) to Barons Court Junction (51.447910°N 3.189787°W) on the A4160 was opened in 1988. It is only 0.8 km (0.50 mi), but it is an important link to provide access to the PDR from Penarth and the southern part of the Vale of Glamorgan. It also bypasses Penarth Road (A4160) for traffic going in and out of Cardiff city centre.

The most recent development, which began at the end of 2006 and into 2007 was the widening of the road between the Cogan Viaduct and the Ferry Road Interchange to a 3-lane dual-carriageway. A new junction was also built for the Cardiff International Sports Village directly from Cogan Spur; also the Barons Court roundabout was replaced by a signal controlled crossroad. The main contractor for this project was Laing O'Rourke Civil Engineering.

Cogan Viaduct

The Cogan Viaduct (Welsh: Traphont Cogan) is the most important element of the Cogan Spur as it crosses the River Ely with a central span of 95 metres (312 ft). In total it has 6 spans; 40 m (130 ft), 60 m (200 ft), 60 m, 60m, 95 m and 60 m. It is made from a multi-span glued segmental structure of rectangular box sections. In all over 300 sections were used to construct the viaduct, each weighing from 43 tonnes (43,000 kg) to 117 tonnes (117,000 kg). The Cogan Viaduct was again designed by South Glamorgan County Council, who won a Concrete Society Commendation in 1989 for the design.

=== Central Link Road (A4234) ===
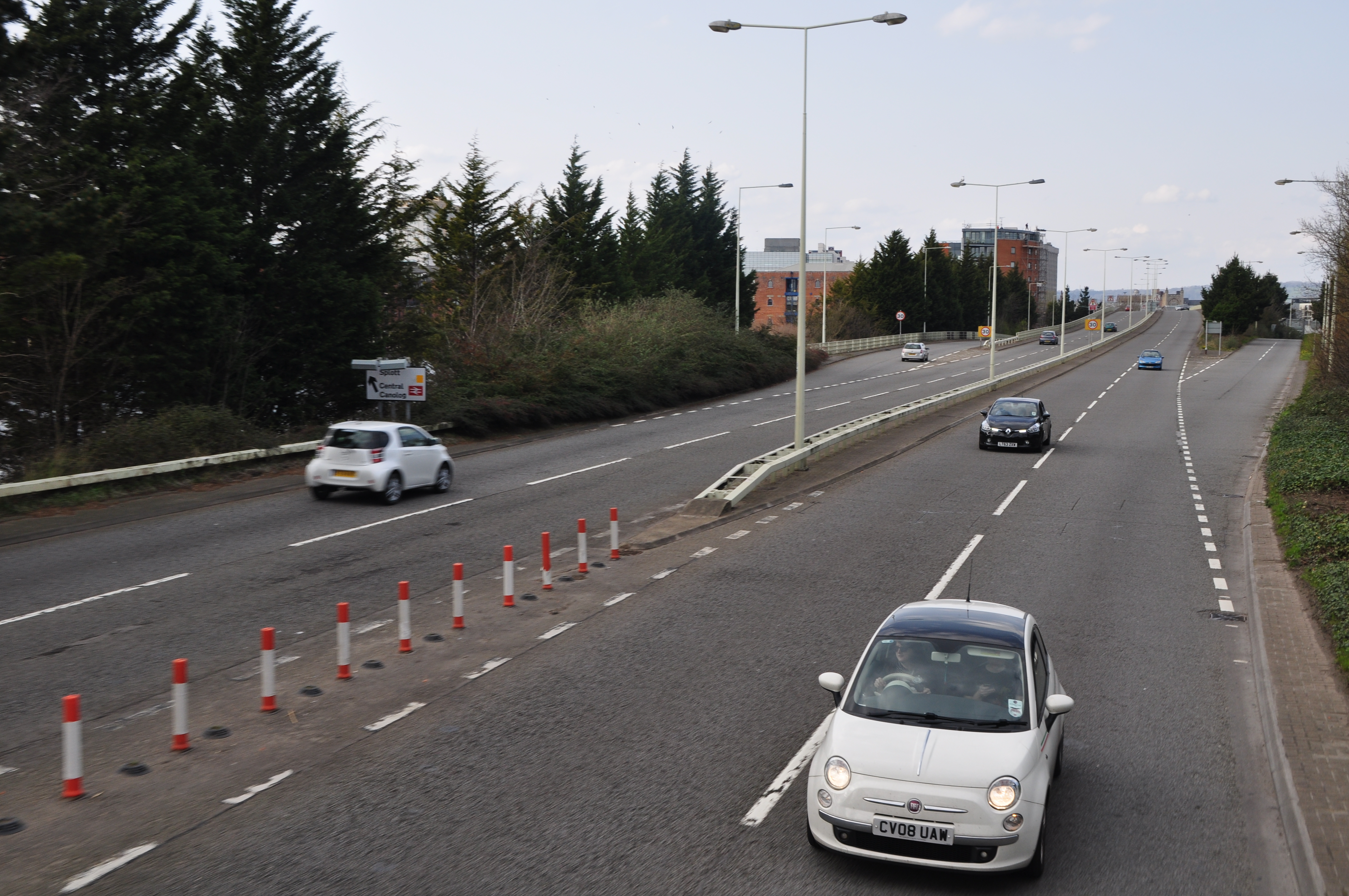
Central Link Road The Splott Junction road looking north

The £8.5 million Central Link (Welsh: Ffordd Gyswllt Canolog) between the Queen's Gate Roundabout (51.468399°N 3.157366°W) and the junction on Adam Street (51.479557°N 3.167631°W) on the A4160 was opened on 16 February 1989. When it was first opened it only linked Cardiff city centre with Cardiff Bay. It was not until the Butetown Link was opened on 27 March 1995 that this road started to be used as a link to the motorway network, Penarth and the Vale of Glamorgan. It will not be until the Eastern Bay Link is built, when traffic from the city centre will use it to travel east, that it will be fully used. The length of the A4234 is just 1.45 km (0.90 mi) and is entirely a two lane dual carriageway with clearway restrictions.

== Abandoned spur roads ==
=== Ely Spur ===
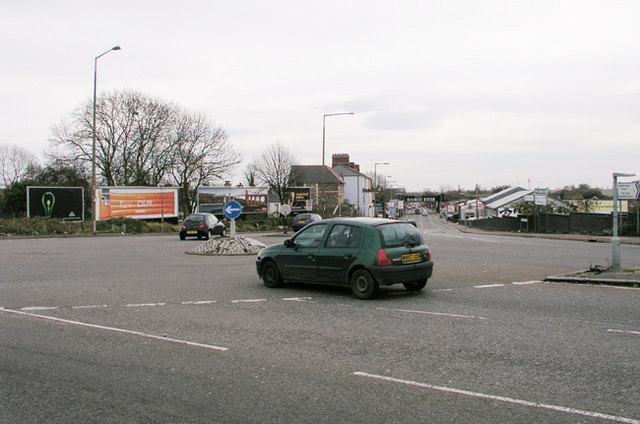
Ely Bridge Roundabout

The Ely Spur was planned to run from a new interchange on the Ely Link Road to the Ely Bridge Roundabout on the A48. It was only 1.2 km (0.75 mi) in length, but it would have reduced through traffic in the residential area of Ely, namely on Cowbridge Road West travelling to and from the A48. But it has now been announced that this proposal has now been officially abandoned.

=== Cardiff Airport Link Road ===
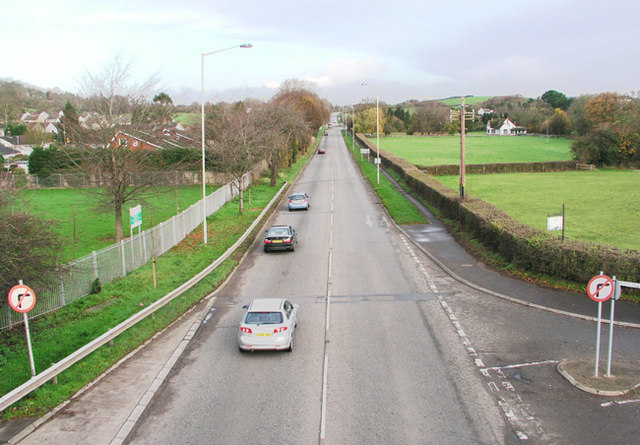
The A4050 road

The Cardiff Airport Link Road (Welsh: Ffordd Gyswllt Maes Awyr Caerdydd) was a proposed spur road off of the A4232 through to Cardiff Airport, when plans for the road were scrapped by the WAG in June 2009. The single carriageway A4050 road, from Cardiff to Cardiff Airport is currently the main road from Barry to Cardiff and is the main commuter route. There were 4 proposed schemes linking the Ely Link Road, south of the Culverhouse Cross Interchange, through to the A4226 north of Barry. The estimated cost of this scheme would have been £96m, including the widening of the A4232.

== Services ==
Services on the A4232

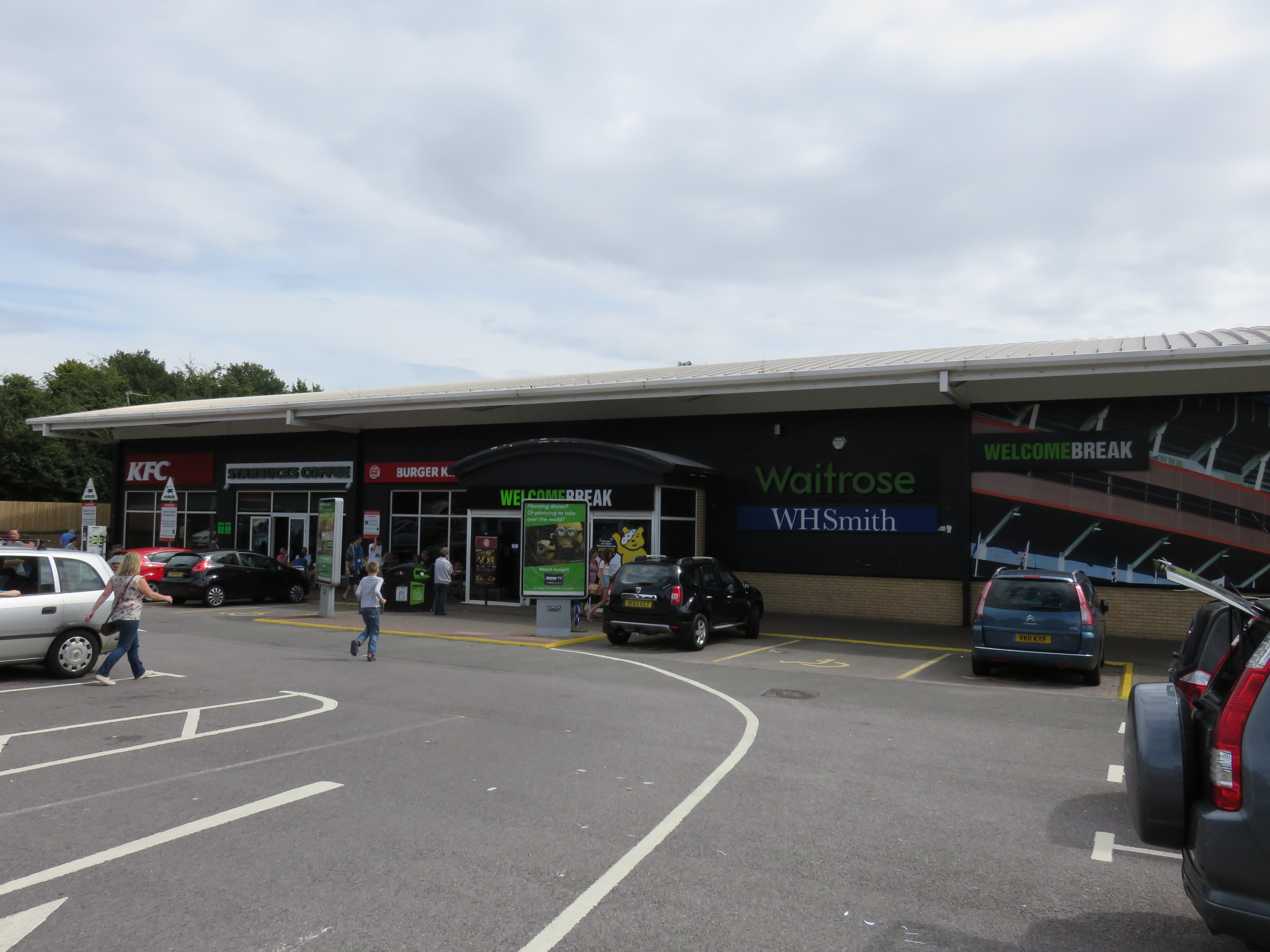
Cardiff Gate services

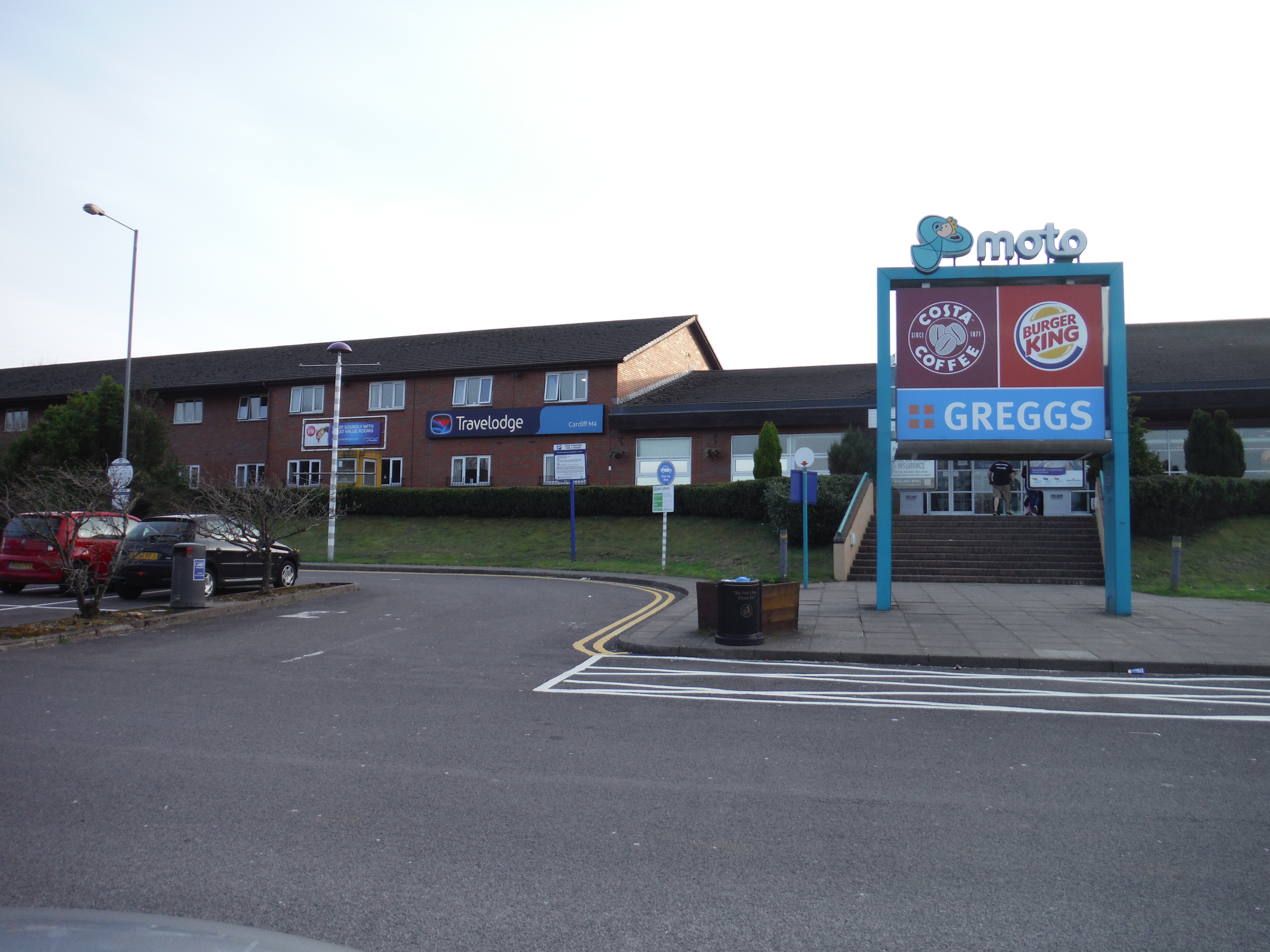
Cardiff West services

The PDR has two service stations for motorists, one at Cardiff West on the Capel Llanilltern Interchange and the other at Cardiff Gate on the Pentwyn Interchange. The services at Cardiff West includes BP petrol, a Travelodge, Burger King, Costa Coffee and W H Smith, while the services at Cardiff Gate includes Shell petrol, a Hotel Ibis, Burger King, KFC, Starbucks, Waitrose and W H Smith.

Traffic Wales is the Welsh Government's traffic information service, it is a partnership between the Welsh Government, the two Trunk Road Agents (South Wales TRA / North & Mid Wales TRA) and the WTTC consultancy Amey. In South Wales the service is managed from the South Wales Traffic Management Centre, also home to INRIX Media's studio, providing live travel information for the media. The Traffic Wales website has five live traffic webcams on the Capel Llanilltern – Culverhouse Cross Link Road (Trunk Road) and the images are updated every 5 minutes. Traffic Wales also operates a Traffic Information Hotline, motorists can use this telephone service by dialling an 0845 number, which gives up to date traffic information and travel advice.

== Traffic congestion ==
Since the western link roads were built, a number of major developments have been built, such as the Cardiff Bay Retail Park, IKEA, Celtic Gateway, Cardiff International Sports Village that includes the Cardiff International Pool, Cardiff International White Water and Cardiff Arena, which have all generated additional traffic at the Ferry Road Interchange. In addition, the Leckwith development, which includes Cardiff City Stadium, Cardiff International Sports Stadium and the Capital Retail Park with a new Asda supermarket, have also significantly increased traffic on the Leckwith Interchange. At the Culverhouse Cross Interchange, older developments such as the Brooklands Retail Park, Wenvoe Retail Park and Valegate Retail Park, including Tesco and Marks & Spencer have also significantly increased congestion along with commuter traffic from the Vale of Glamorgan. From 1989 to 1997 there had been an increase in traffic of 78% and a further increase of 35% by 2016 is predicted by the Assembly. The Vale of Glamorgan Council also expressed reservations about the new developments of the Cardiff International Sports Village and the Cardiff City Stadium, which includes the Capital Retail Park. On 18 October 2006, the council requested that the WAG assess the existing traffic conditions and future growth in traffic on the network.

== See also ==
- Transport in Cardiff
- Trunk roads in Wales

== See also ==
- Cardiff & Newport A-Z Street Atlas 2007 Edition
