= Cardiff Gate =

Business park in south Wales

Coordinates: 51°32′21″N 3°07′48″W

Cardiff Gate is a business park development, located on the junction 30 of the M4 motorway and the A4232 north east of Cardiff, South Wales.

== Development ==
In light of the development of farmland into housing at Pontprennau in the east of Cardiff in the late 1980s, an area was allocated within the development for commercial office use.

== Cardiff Gate International Business Park ==
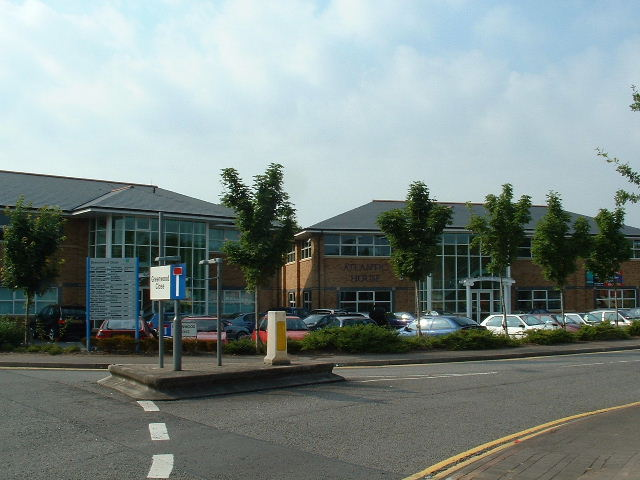

Cardiff Gate International Business Park is a 100-acre (0.40 km^{2}) commercial development site. Presently 60% developed, existing tenants including:

- ADT Security Services
- Halifax Bank of Scotland card services
- International Baccalaureate
- Regus
- Scottish and Southern Energy
- Motorcar dealerships franchises for both Mercedes-Benz and Audi cars

It was the site for the UK headquarters for 118 118, which moved to central Cardiff from summer 2014.

Hospitality is provided by a Hotel Ibis, and a public house/restaurant owned by Toby Carvery. Also, a Christian church World Mission Agency- Winners Chapel Int'l Cardiff.

== Cardiff Gate motorway services ==
Cardiff Gate services is the motorway service station, located closest to the M4 motorway. Previously owned by Granada Ltd., it is owned and operated by Welcome Break. Within the relatively small services building there are shops, toilets and a cash machine. The fuel franchise is operated by TotalEnergies.

== Cardiff Gate Retail Park ==
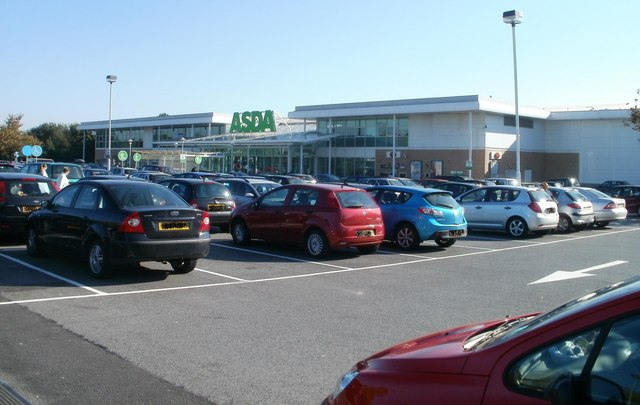
Asda in Cardiff Gate Retail Park

Cardiff Gate Retail Park is actually located within the residential development of Pontrennau, accessed via the A4232. Retaillers include a 24/7 Asda supermarket, which also has a petrol station; B&Q and several home furniture stores. There is also a McDonald's fast food restaurant.

Although Cardiff Gate services provides secure 24hr parking for HGVs, until Autumn 2014 many HGVs parked overnight in B&Q's carpark, because it is free. The sites owners then gained planning permission for a new development to the East of the site, adding a single building structure containing smaller footprint retail units, with tenants schedule to include Costa Coffee, Greggs and a commercial gymnasium.
