= Cardiff West services =

M4 service area in Wales

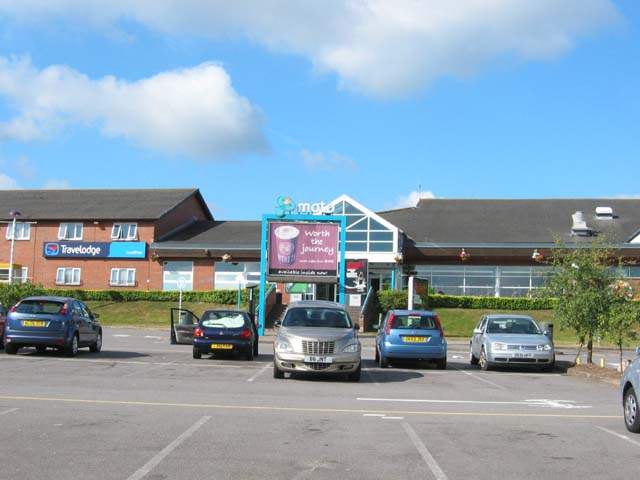
- The main building.

- Location within Cardiff

Information
- County: Mid Glamorgan
- Road: M4 motorway
- Coordinates: 51.5063°N 3.3054°W
- Operator: Moto Hospitality
- Date opened: 1991
- Website: moto-way.com/services/cardiff-west/

Cardiff West services (Welsh: Gwasanaethau Gorllewin Caerdydd) is a motorway service station on junction 33 of the M4 motorway and the Capel Llanilltern junction of the A4232 near Cardiff, Wales. It is owned by Moto. In 2008, the services won the AA Patrol Approved Awards for best toilet.

The services has previously acted as a site for escorting fans to Cardiff City FC games, because of travelling restrictions imposed on away fans visiting the city. These restrictions were relaxed in 2010, but the services continued to act as a sales point for match vouchers. Subsequently, the services has become well known to Cardiff City fans, particularly after a prominent appearance in the situation comedy Gavin & Stacey.

In 2004, the services was the site of several protests over the rise in fuel duty. In May, 50 heavy goods vehicles (HGVs) entered the services' car park as the ending point of a "go slow" demonstration along the M4. In June, the site was chosen as a meeting place for another protest. 150 HGVs made a journey from the services to the centre of Cardiff.

In 2010, rugby player Andy Powell was arrested at the services for allegedly driving a stolen golf buggy while intoxicated.

Next eastbound: Cardiff Gate	Motorway service stations on the M4 motorway	Next westbound: Sarn Park
