= A4161 road =

Road in UK

A4161

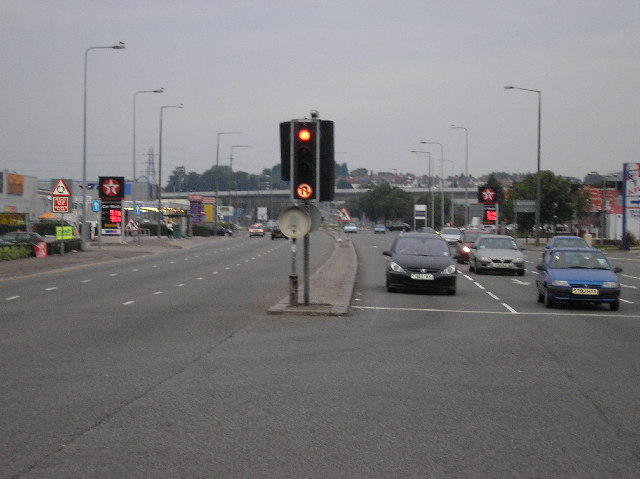
- Newport Road, with the A4232 Southern Way flyover in the background

Major junctions
- East end: A4232 (Southern Way); 51.5002°N 3.1402°W
- A4232 A469 A4160 A470 A4119; A48
- West end: A48 (Ely Bridge); 51.4851°N 3.2286°W

Location
- Country: United Kingdom
- Constituent country: Wales
- Primary destinations: Cardiff

Road network
- Roads in the United Kingdom; Motorways; A and B road zones

The A4161 is a main road in Cardiff, Wales, United Kingdom. The main purpose of the road is to link the city centre with the M4 motorway in the west at junction 33, and in the east with the A48(M) motorway at St Mellons.

== History ==
The 1923 route of the A48 was the main east–west link in south Wales. The A48 in Cardiff was re-numbered to the A4161 on 19 November 1971 when the Eastern Avenue dual carriageway became the A48. By 2 November 1975, Queen Street was partly pedestrianised and 2 subways were opened under North Road and Boulevard de Nantes to allow the A4161 then to move from Queen Street to Dumfries Place, Stuttgarter Strasse, Boulevard De Nantes. The A48 section between Rumney and St Mellons later became the B4487 and Southern Way (A4232) was built in 1978.

== Old A48 route ==
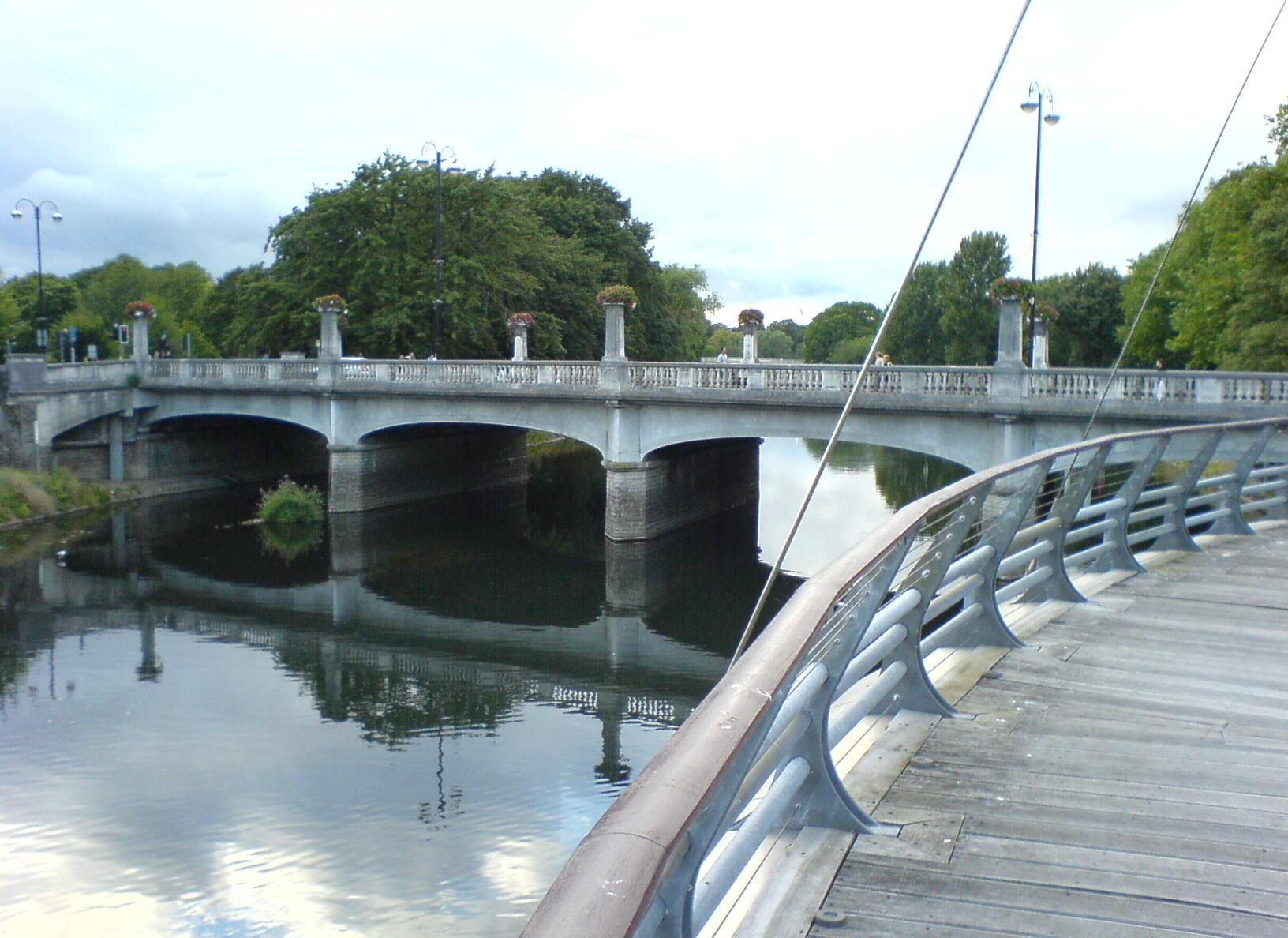
Cardiff Bridge

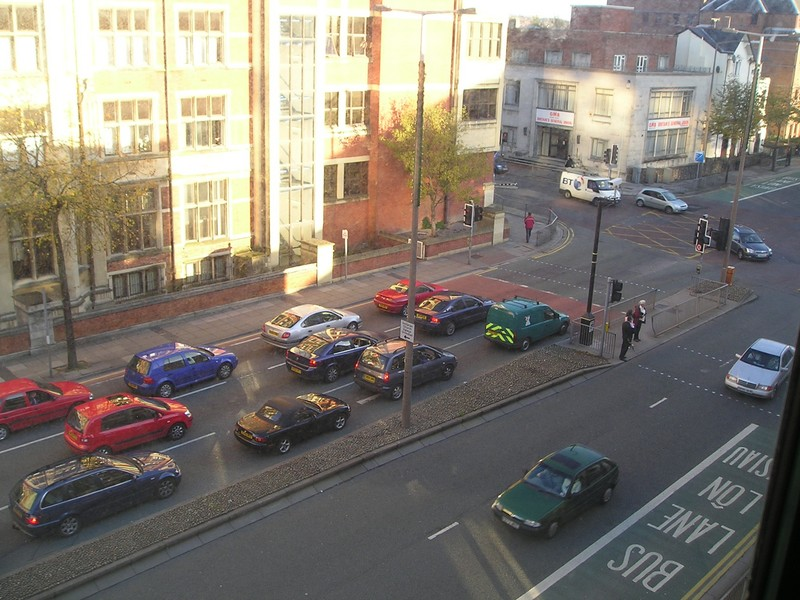
Junction of Newport Road (A4161) and West Grove

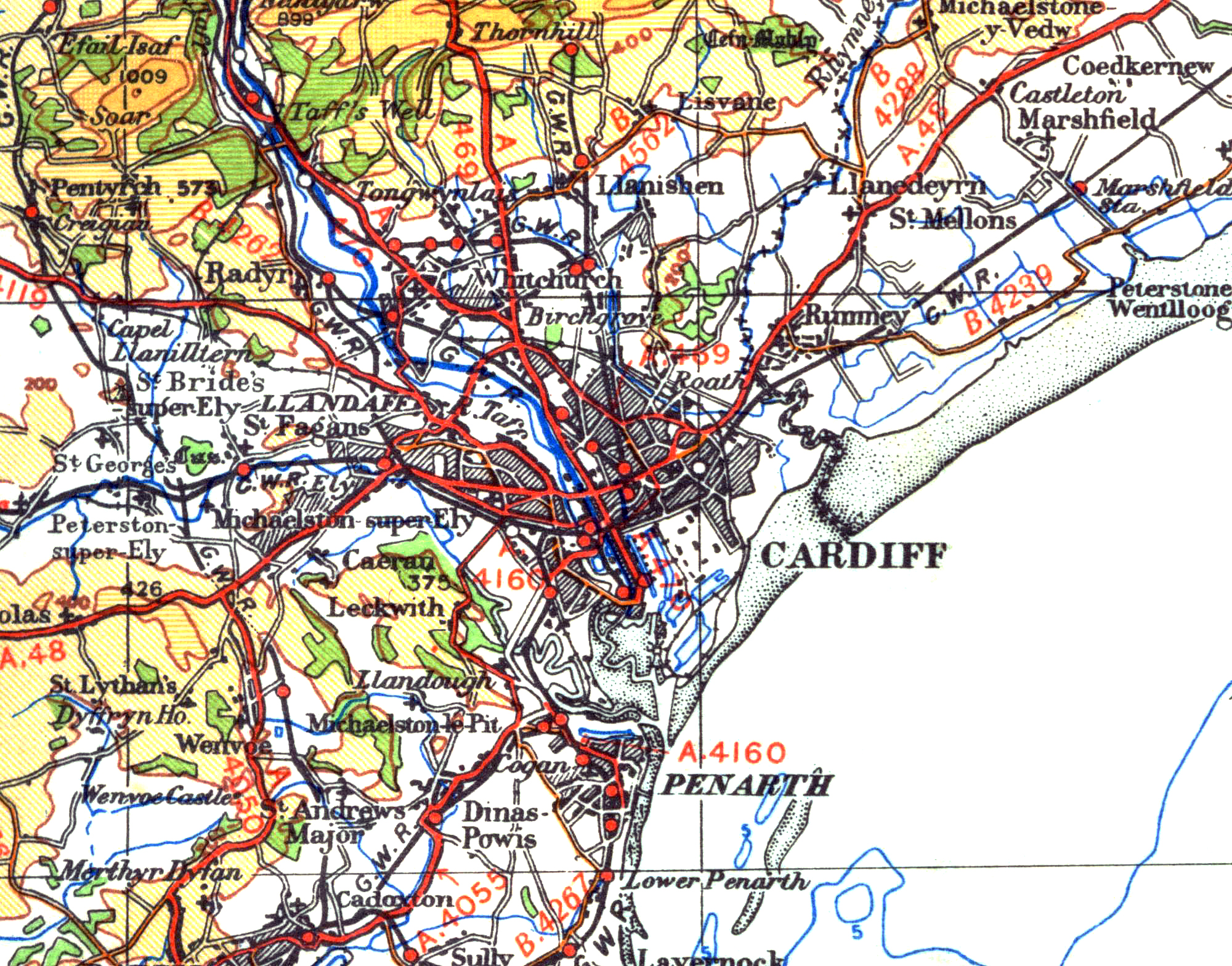
Cardiff in 1946

From east to west:

- Newport Road
- Queen Street
- Duke Street
- Castle Street
- Cowbridge Road East

== Current route ==
From east to west it runs through the following roads in Cardiff:

- From Southern Way west along Newport Road
- Dumfries Place
- Stuttgarter Strasse
- Boulevard De Nantes

The road then follows the A470 from North Road (alongside Cardiff Castle through to Duke Street, before becoming the A4161 again from:

- Castle Street, and over Cardiff Bridge
- Cowbridge Road East
- Wellington Street
- Atlas Road
- Lansdowne Road
- Cowbridge Road East again, ending at Ely Bridge (roundabout on the A48)

== Types of road ==
From	To	Type of road
Southern Way	Albany Road	3 lane (both ways) dual carriageway
Albany Road	Broadway	2 lane single carriageway
Broadway	North Road	2 lane (both ways) dual carriageway
North Road and Duke Street (A470)
High Street	Cathedral Road	2 lane (both ways) dual carriageway
Cathedral Road	Ely Bridge	2 lane single carriageway

== Notes ==
- Cardiff & Newport A-Z Street Atlas 2007 Edition
