= A48(M) motorway =

Road in Wales

A48(M)
- A48(M) highlighted in blue
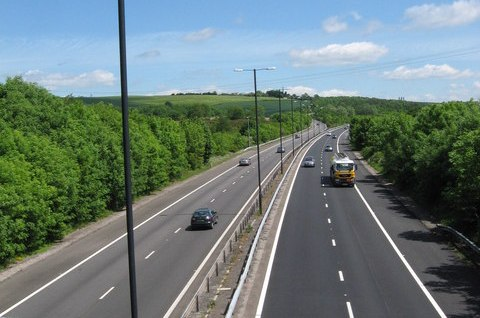
- North-Eastbound heading towards M4 junction 29

Route information
- Maintained by South Wales Trunk Road Agent
- Length: 2.0 mi (3.2 km)
- Existed: 1977–present

Major junctions
- Northeast end: Castleton, Newport
- J29 → M4 motorway
- Southwest end: St Mellons, Cardiff

Location
- Country: United Kingdom
- Counties: Newport, Cardiff
- Primary destinations: Cardiff

Road network
- Roads in the United Kingdom; Motorways; A and B road zones
← A38(M)	→ A57(M)

The A48(M) is a motorway in Wales that links Cardiff with Newport. It is a 2-mile-long (3 km) spur of the M4 motorway. At St Mellons, it runs continuously into the dual-carriageway A48, which also has (albeit narrow) hard shoulders. The A48(M) has no other junctions and opened in 1977. The M4 was extended west from junction 29 in 1980.

== Junctions ==
A48(M) motorway junctions
North-Eastbound exits	Junction	South-Westbound exits
M4; London	J29 M4 (Castleton)	Start of motorway
Entering the City and County Borough of Newport		Entering the City and County of Cardiff
Start of motorway Newport	J29A (St Mellons)	A48 Cardiff

== Previous A48(M) motorways ==
The 6-mile (9.7 km) Port Talbot bypass which opened in 1966, was numbered A48(M) before its incorporation into the westward extension of the M4 in the 1970s. Some maps show the Morriston bypass section of the M4 as also having been originally numbered A48(M), although whether this number was ever used on the ground has been questioned.
