= List of people from Cardiff =

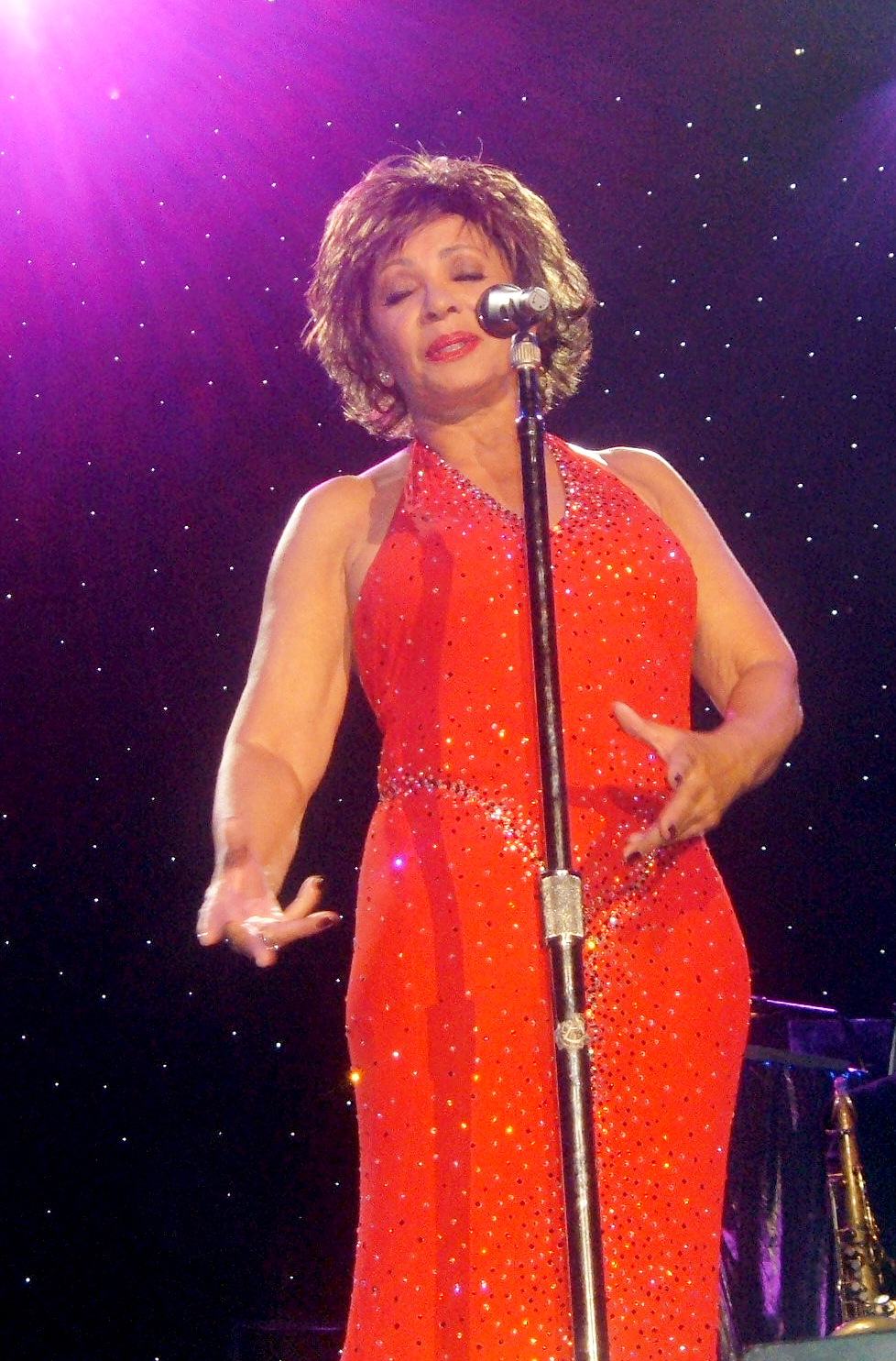
Shirley Bassey at Wembley Arena, 2006

Cardiff is the capital and largest city of Wales. Many notable people were born in Cardiff or share a strong association with the city, ranging from historical figures such as Henry Morgan to more recent figures such as Roald Dahl, Ken Follett and Griff Rhys Jones. In particular, the city has been the birthplace of international sportsmen and women, including Olympic athletes such as Paulo Radmilovic, Tanni Grey-Thompson and Colin Jackson. Many professional and international footballers, such as Craig Bellamy, Gareth Bale, Ryan Giggs and Joe Ledley, and former managers of the Wales national football team Terry Yorath and John Toshack were born in Cardiff, as were a number of international rugby union and rugby league players including Frank Whitcombe, Billy Boston, Gareth Llewellyn and Colin Dixon.

Cardiff is also well known for its musicians such as Ivor Novello, after whom the Ivor Novello Awards are named. Shirley Bassey is familiar to many as the singer of three James Bond movie theme tunes, while Charlotte Church is famous as a crossover classical/pop singer, and Shakin' Stevens was one of the top selling male artists in the UK during the 1980s. A number of Cardiff-based bands, such as Catatonia and the Super Furry Animals, were popular during the 1990s.

== Art and literature ==
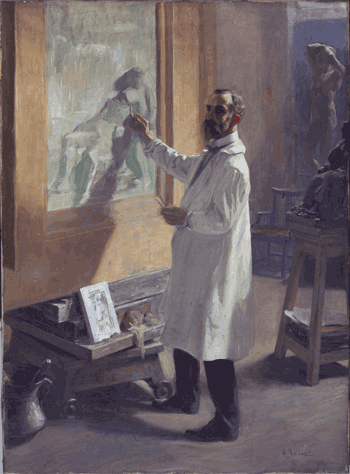
Goscombe John

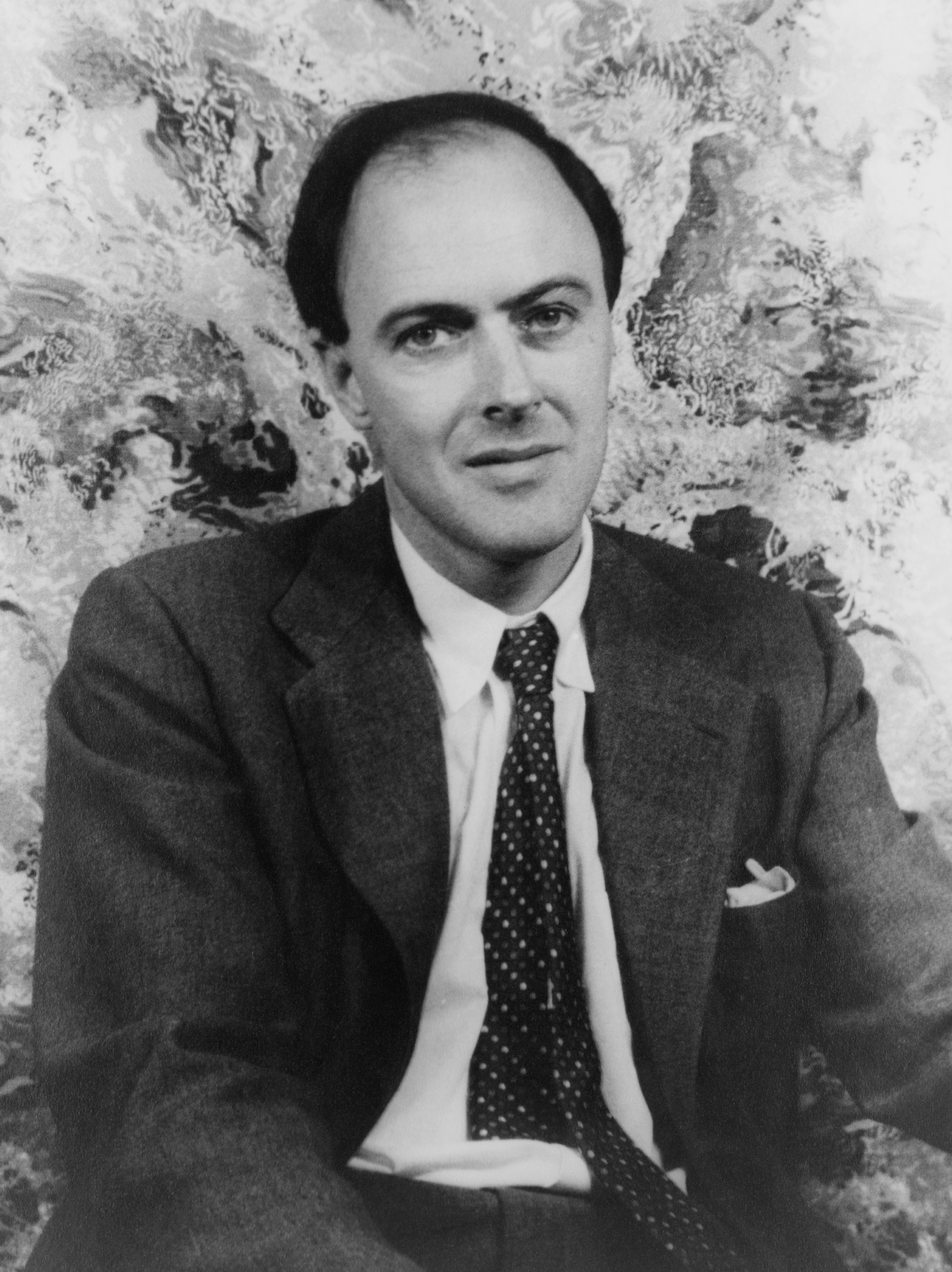
Roald Dahl

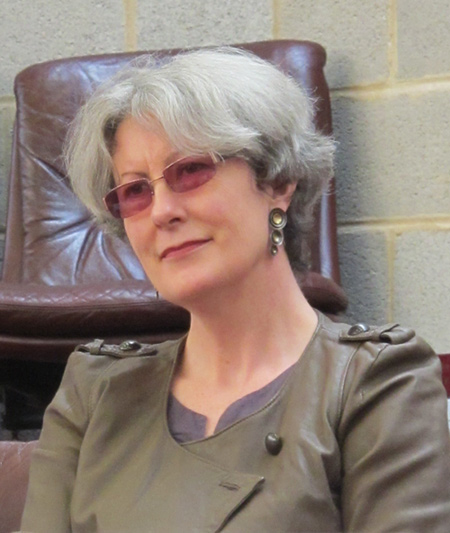
Gwyneth Lewis

Name	Born	Died	Description	Connection with Cardiff	Ref
Danny Abse	1923	2014	Poet and writer	Born in Cardiff	
Trezza Azzopardi	1961	—	Novelist	Born in Cardiff	
Gillian Clarke	1937	—	Poet, was named the third National Poet of Wales in 2008	Born in Cardiff	
Roald Dahl	1916	1990	Author of works such as James and the Giant Peach, Charlie and the Chocolate Factory, Matilda, The Witches, Fantastic Mr Fox and The BFG	Born in Llandaff, Cardiff	
Peter Finch	1947	—	Poet, author of works such as Real Cardiff, Real Wales, Edging The Estuary, and Zen Cymru	Born in Cardiff	
Ken Follett	1949	—	Author of works such as The Key to Rebecca, Lie Down with Lions, Triple, and World Without End	Born in Cardiff	
Esther Grainger	1912	1990	Artist	Born in Cardiff	
Goscombe John	1860	1952	Sculptor, specialising in public monuments and statues of public figures	Born in Canton, Cardiff	
Bobi Jones	1929	—	Welsh language academic and writer, former chair in Welsh language at Aberystwyth University	Born in Cardiff	
Rob Lacey	1962	2006	Actor and author of The Word on the Street	Born in Cardiff	
Gwyneth Lewis	1959	—	First National Poet of Wales, wrote the words which appear on the front elevation of the Wales Millennium Centre	Born in Cardiff	
Helen Mackay	1897	1973	Artist, sculptor	Born in Cardiff	
Brian Morris	1930	2001	Poet, critic, professor of literature, and former education spokesman in the House of Lords	Born in Cardiff	
Robert Morton Nance	1873	1959	Cornish language author	Born in Cardiff	
Pixie O'Harris	1903	1991	Poet, author, broadcaster, artist, illustrator and designer	Born in Cardiff	
Joan Oxland	1920	2009	Artist	Born and lived in Cardiff	
Michael Raven	1938	2008	Author	Born in Cardiff	
Bernice Rubens	1928	2004	Author of works such as Madame Sousatzka, The Elected Member (winner of the 1970 Booker Prize) and A Solitary Grief	Born in Cardiff	
Norena Shopland		—	Author	Born in Cardiff	
Alfred Sisley	1839	1899	Impressionist painter: one of the original French Impressionists, though he himself was British; produced seventeen paintings of Penarth and the Gower in 1897	Married in Cardiff Register Office in 1897; two of his Welsh paintings are in the National Museum of Wales in Cardiff	
Howard Spring	1889	1965	Author of works such as Fame Is the Spur and My Son, My Son!	Born in Cardiff	
Thomas E. Stephens	1886	1966	Painter, specialising in portraits of American political and military figures such as Dwight D. Eisenhower	Born in Cardiff	
R. S. Thomas	1913	2000	Poet, nominated for the 1995 Nobel Prize for Literature	Born in Cardiff	
Margaret Lindsay Williams	1888	1960	Portrait painter	Born in Cardiff	
D. B. Wyndham-Lewis	1891	1969	Writer, biographer and editor, co-wrote the screenplay for The Man Who Knew Too Much	Lived in Cardiff since childhood	

== Business and finance ==
Name	Born	Died	Description	Connection with Cardiff	Ref
Lewis Lougher	1871	1955	Established his own shipping company, became chairman of a large number of shipping companies in Cardiff, Penarth and Barry, chairman of the federation of Bristol Channel shipowners, and chairman of the Cardiff Chamber of Trade; former Member of Parliament for Cardiff East and Cardiff Central	Born in Llandaff, Cardiff	
Michael Moritz	1954	—	Venture capitalist and former director of Google	Born in Cardiff	
Howard Stringer	1942	—	Chairman and former president and CEO of Sony Corporation	Born in Cardiff	
Christopher J. Yorath	1879	1932	Engineer, urban planner, president of three Canadian utility companies	Lived in Cardiff since childhood	

== Entertainment ==
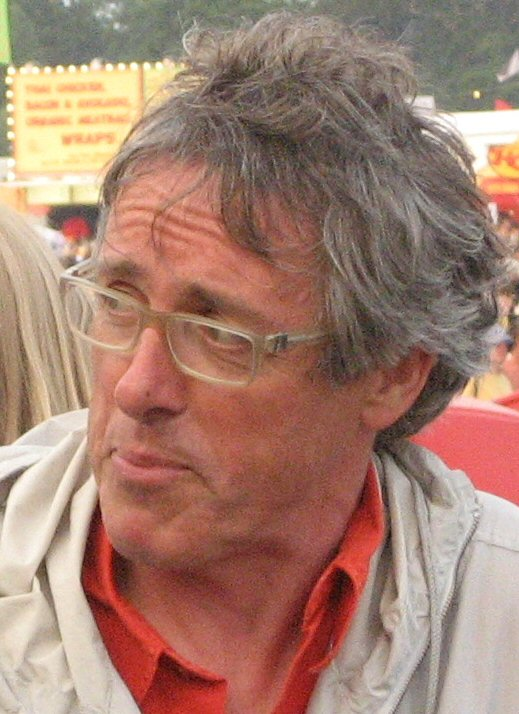
Griff Rhys Jones

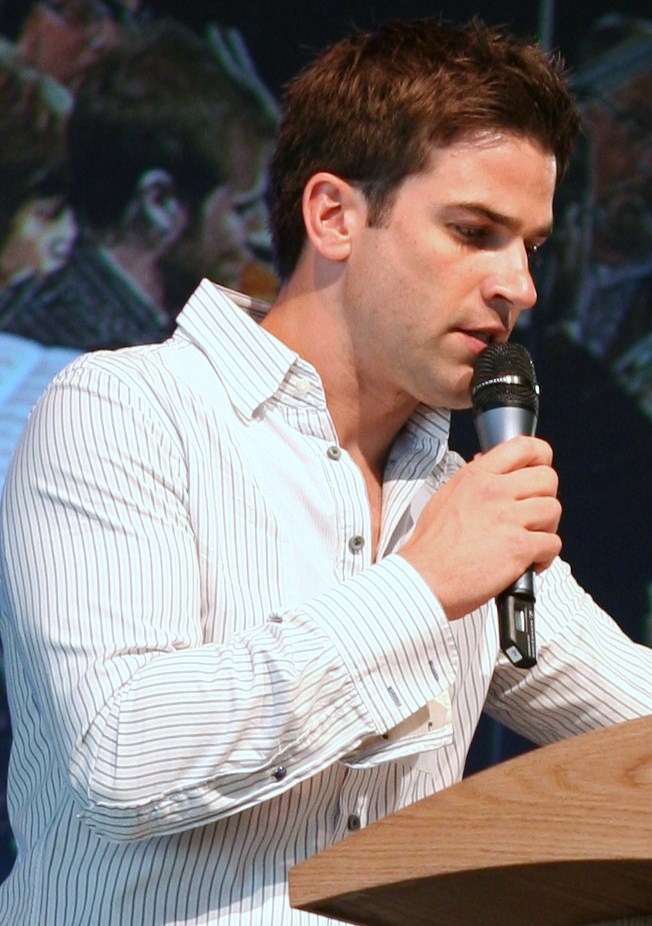
Gethin Jones

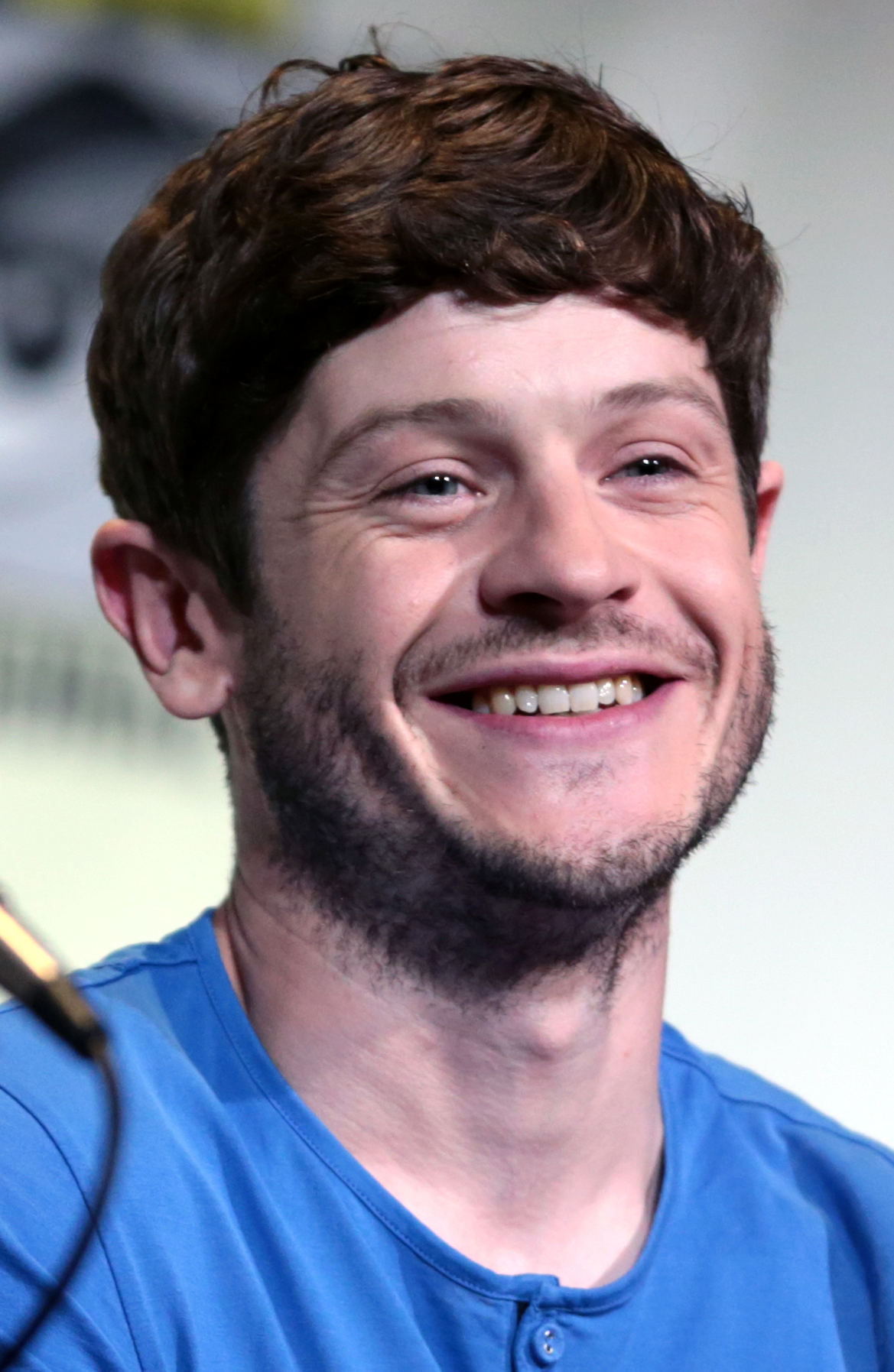
Iwan Rheon

Name	Born	Died	Description	Connection with Cardiff	Ref
Peter Baynham	1963	—	Screenwriter and comedy writer, was involved in works such as I'm Alan Partridge, Brass Eye, Monkey Dust, and Borat: Cultural Learnings of America for Make Benefit Glorious Nation of Kazakhstan	Born in Cardiff	
Emily Burnett	1997	—	Television and stage actress who has appeared in The Dumping Ground, So Awkward and Hollyoaks	Born in Cardiff	
Shirley Dynevor	1933	2023	Actress who has appeared in Charlesworth, Rogue Male and The Wednesday Play	Born in Cardiff	
Helen M. Grace	1974	—	Film director and screenwriter, directed Are You Ready for Love?	Born in Cardiff	
Lauren Harries	1978	—	Television celebrity, first appeared on Wogan in 1988	Lived in Cardiff since early childhood	
Polly James	1986/7	—	Radio and TV presenter	Born in Cardiff	
Gethin Jones	1978	—	Television and radio presenter, presented Blue Peter from 2005 to 2008	Born in Cardiff	
Richard Marquand	1938	1987	Film director, involved in works such as Return of the Jedi, Jagged Edge and Hearts of Fire	Born in Llanishen, Cardiff	
Terry Nation	1930	1997	Television scriptwriter, creator of the Daleks	Born in Cardiff	
Robin Nedwell	1946	1999	Film, television and stage actor, involved in works such as Doctor in the House, The Tragedy of Macbeth and The Vault of Horror	Lived in Cardiff since childhood	
Tessie O'Shea	1914	1995	Stage actress and entertainer, involved in works such as The Girl Who Came to Supper, The Russians Are Coming, the Russians Are Coming and Bedknobs and Broomsticks	Born in Cardiff	
Peter Philp	1920	2006	Television presenter, dramatist and antiques expert, wrote Castle of Deception	Born in Cardiff	
Mathew Pritchard	1973	—	Professional skateboarder, part of the Dirty Sanchez crew, made regular appearances on Balls of Steel	Born in Cardiff	
Angharad Rees	1949	2012	Film, stage and television actress, involved in works such as Poldark, The Gathering Storm, The Avengers and Under Milk Wood	Lived in Cardiff since childhood	
Iwan Rheon	1985	—	Film and television actor, singer-songwriter, involved in works such as Pobol y Cwm, Misfits and Game of Thrones	Lived in Cardiff since childhood	
Matthew Rhys	1974	—	Film and television actor, involved in works such as Brothers & Sisters, The Edge of Love and The Americans	Born in Cardiff	
Griff Rhys Jones	1953	—	Comedian, writer and actor, involved in works such as Not the Nine O'Clock News, Alas Smith and Jones and Morons from Outer Space	Born in Cardiff	
Lisa Rogers	1971	—	Television presenter, involved in works such as The Big Breakfast, Scrapheap Challenge and Loose Women	Born in Cardiff	
Stan Stennett	1925	2013	Comedian, actor and jazz musician, involved in works such as Coronation Street, Crossroads and Casualty	Born in Cardiff	
Honeysuckle Weeks	1979	—	Television actress, involved in works such as Midsomer Murders, Foyle's War and The Inspector Lynley Mysteries	Born in Cardiff	
Perdita Weeks	1985	—	Television and film actress, involved in works such as Spice World, The Prince and the Pauper and The Tudors	Born in Cardiff	
Clifford Williams	1926	2005	Stage actor and director, involved in works such as The Duchess of Malfi, As You Like It and Antony and Cleopatra	Born in Cardiff	
Peter Wingfield	1962	—	Film and television actor, best known for his role as Methos in Highlander: The Series	Born in Grangetown, Cardiff	

== Historical figures ==
Name	Born	Died	Description	Connection with Cardiff	Ref
Anne de Beauchamp	1444	1449	15th Countess of Warwick	Born in Cardiff	
Henry Morgan	c. 1635	1684	Bucaneer and colonial administrator	Born in Caerau, Cardiff	
Archibald Dickson	1892	1939	Captain of the SS Stanbrook	Born in Caerau, Cardiff	

== Journalism ==
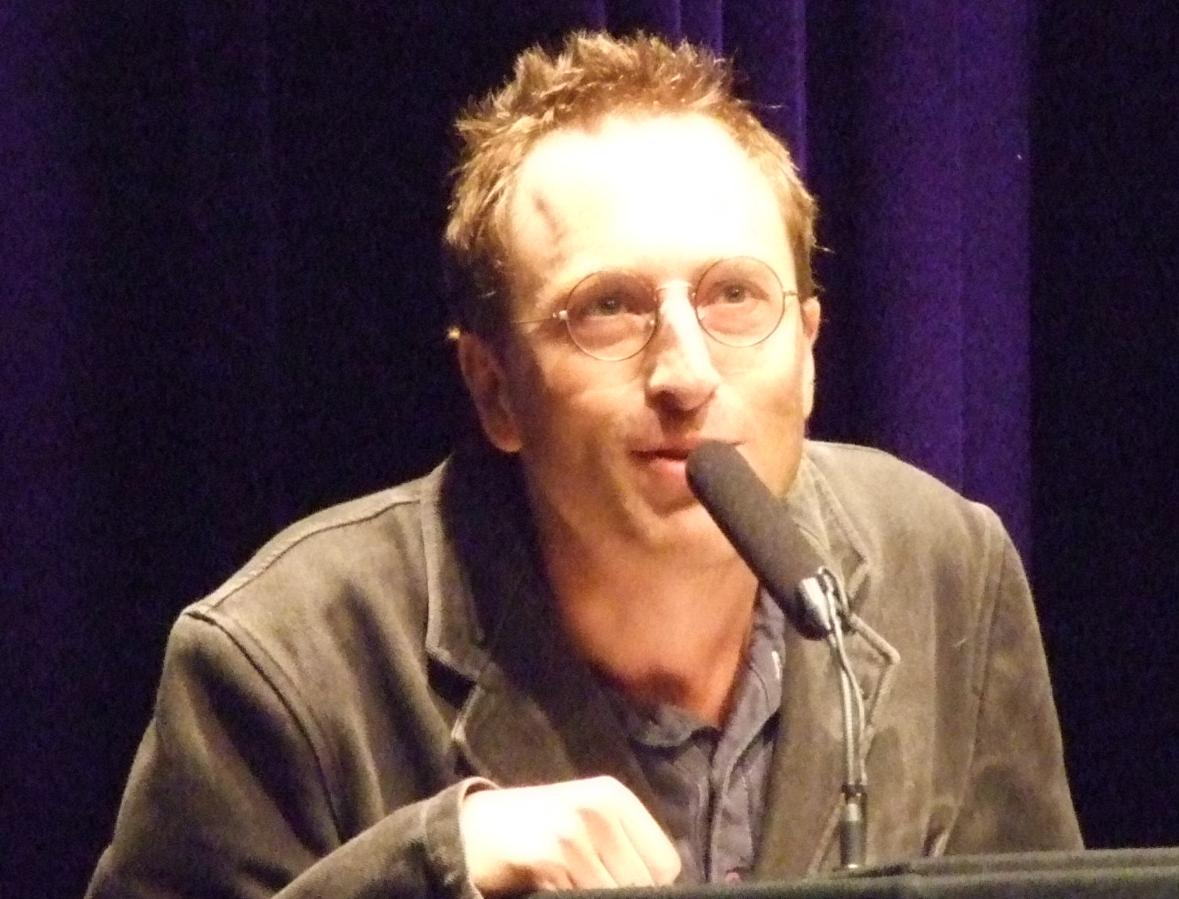
Jon Ronson

Name	Born	Died	Description	Connection with Cardiff	Ref
Stephen Bayley	1951	—	Author and critic for The Observer, GQ and Car Magazine	Born in Cardiff	
Jeremy Bowen	1960	—	Journalist and television presenter, Middle East Editor for the BBC since 2005	Born in Cardiff	
Lynn Bowles	1963	—	Radio reporter for BBC Radio 2	Born in Splott, Cardiff	
Hugh Cudlipp	1913	1998	Newspaper journalist, former chairman of Mirror Group Newspapers	Born in Cathays, Cardiff	
Guto Harri	1966	—	Former television news correspondent for S4C and BBC Wales, Director of Communications at News International since May 2012	Born in Cardiff	
John Humphrys	1943	—	Television and radio presenter, journalist, main presenter for the BBC's Nine O'Clock News from 1981 to 1987	Born in Splott, Cardiff	
Hugh Johns	1922	2007	Football commentator for ITV and HTV Wales, commentated on four World Cup finals including the 1966 FIFA World Cup Final	Lived in Cardiff from childhood	
Jason Mohammad	1975	—	Television and radio presenter of BBC Wales Today and BBC Radio Wales	Born in Cardiff	
Chris Morgan	1952	2008	Television and newspaper journalist for BBC Wales, BBC Radio 4, Thames News and The Sunday Times	Born in Cardiff	
Lucy Owen	1970	—	Television presenter for HTV Wales, ITV News and BBC News	Born in Llandaff, Cardiff	
Jon Ronson	1967	—	Documentary journalist, author of Them: Adventures with Extremists and The Men Who Stare at Goats, film maker and radio presenter	Born in Cardiff	

== Military ==
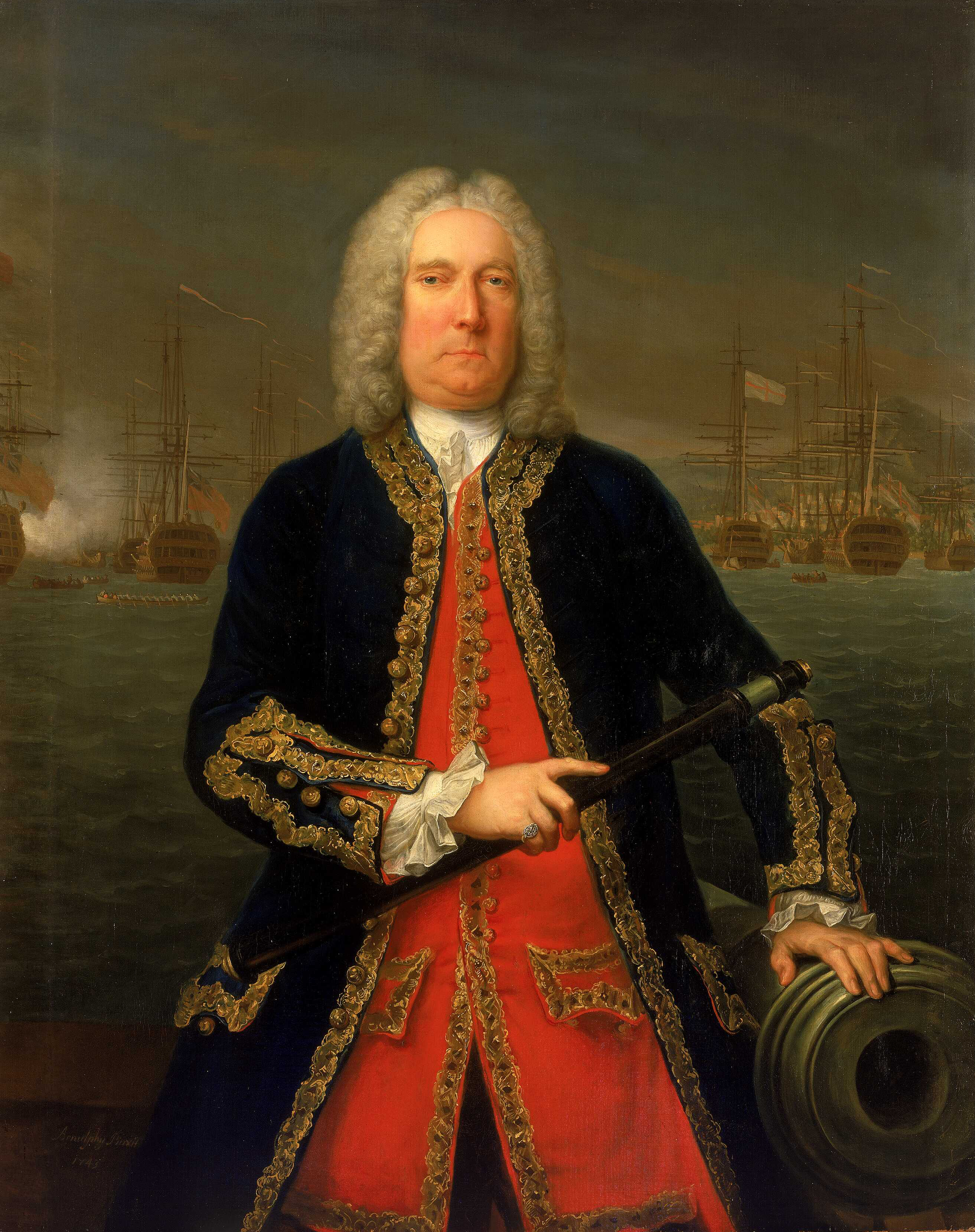
Thomas Matthews

Name	Born	Died	Description	Connection with Cardiff	Ref
Frederick Barter	1891	1952	Served in World War I with the Royal Welch Fusiliers, recipient of the Victoria Cross	Born in Cardiff	
Mick Flynn	1960	—	Served with the Blues and Royals in Northern Ireland, the Falklands War, the Bosnian War, the Second Gulf War and the War in Afghanistan, recipient of the Conspicuous Gallantry Cross and the Military Cross	Born in Cardiff	
Jeff Linton	1909	1989	Served with the Royal Artillery in World War II, attained the rank of Brigadier, recipient of the Distinguished Service Order; played cricket for Glamorgan and Egypt as a right-arm medium-fast bowler	Born in Llandaff, Cardiff	
Thomas Mathews	1676	1751	Admiral of the Royal Navy, served in the Caribbean, Queen Anne's War, the East Indies, the War of the Quadruple Alliance and the War of the Austrian Succession	Born in Llandaff, Cardiff	
Robert Shields	1827	1864	Served with the Royal Welch Fusiliers in the Crimean War, recipient of the Victoria Cross	Born in Cardiff	

== Music ==
=== Performers ===
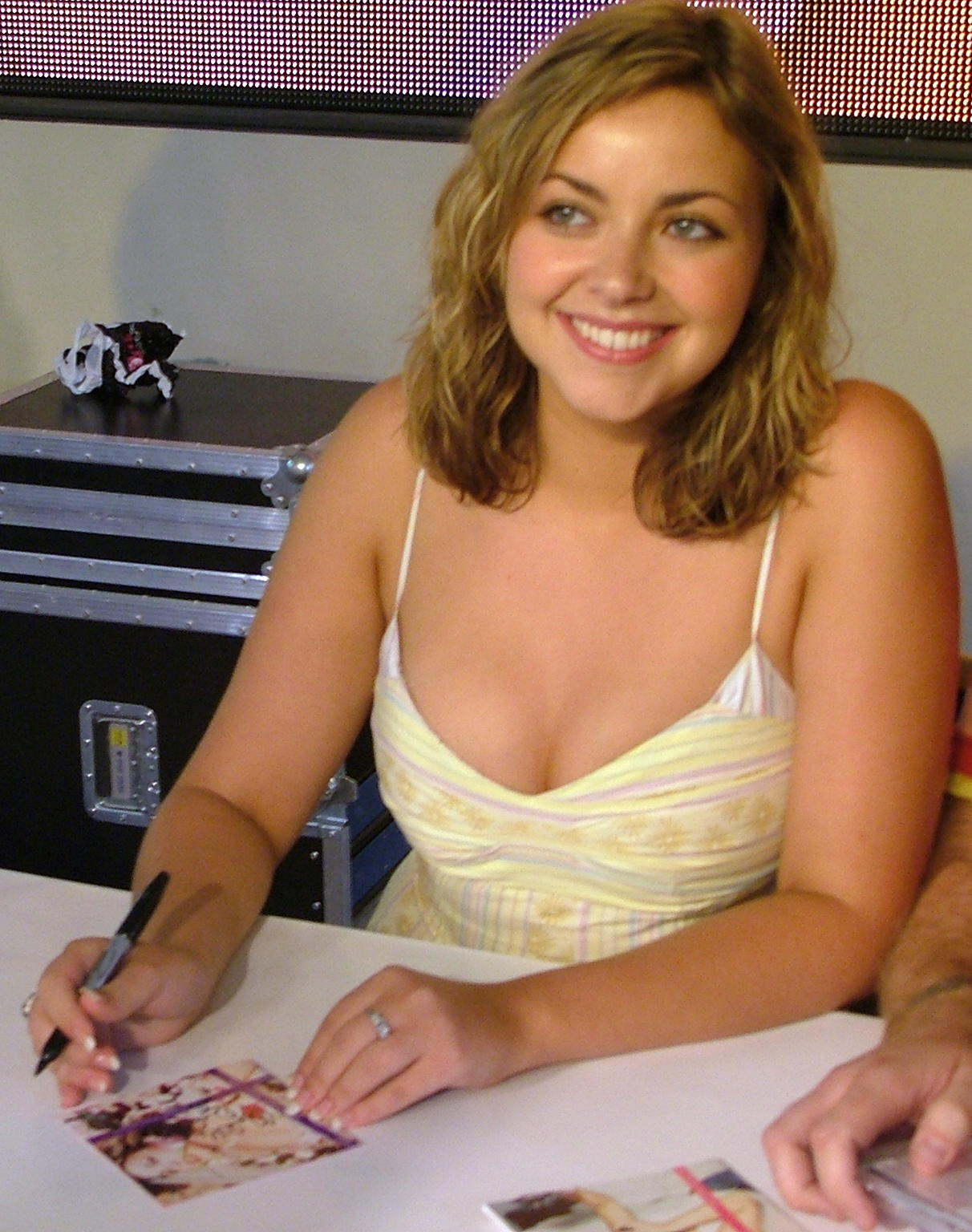
Charlotte Church

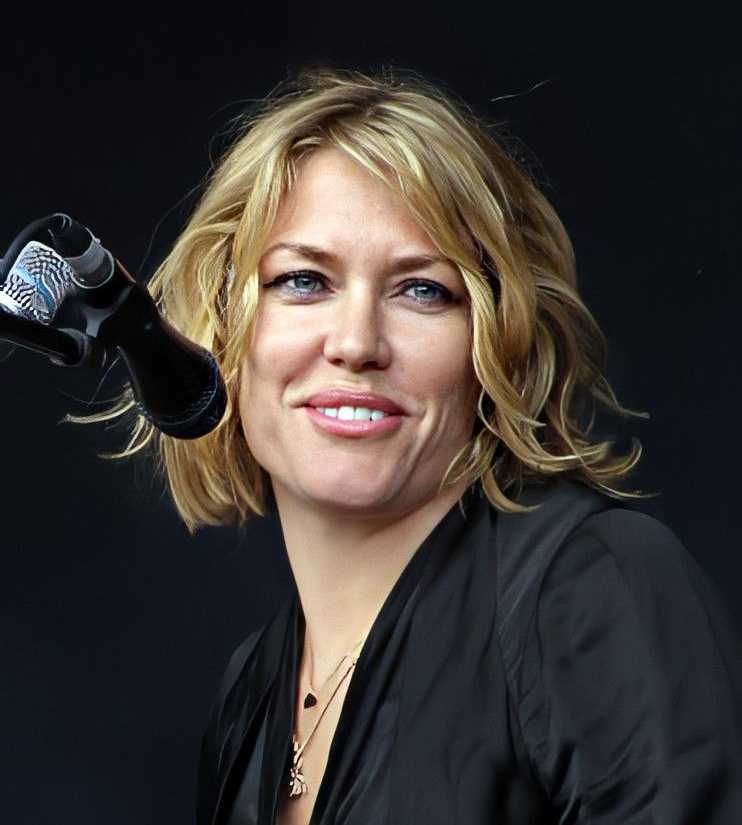
Cerys Matthews

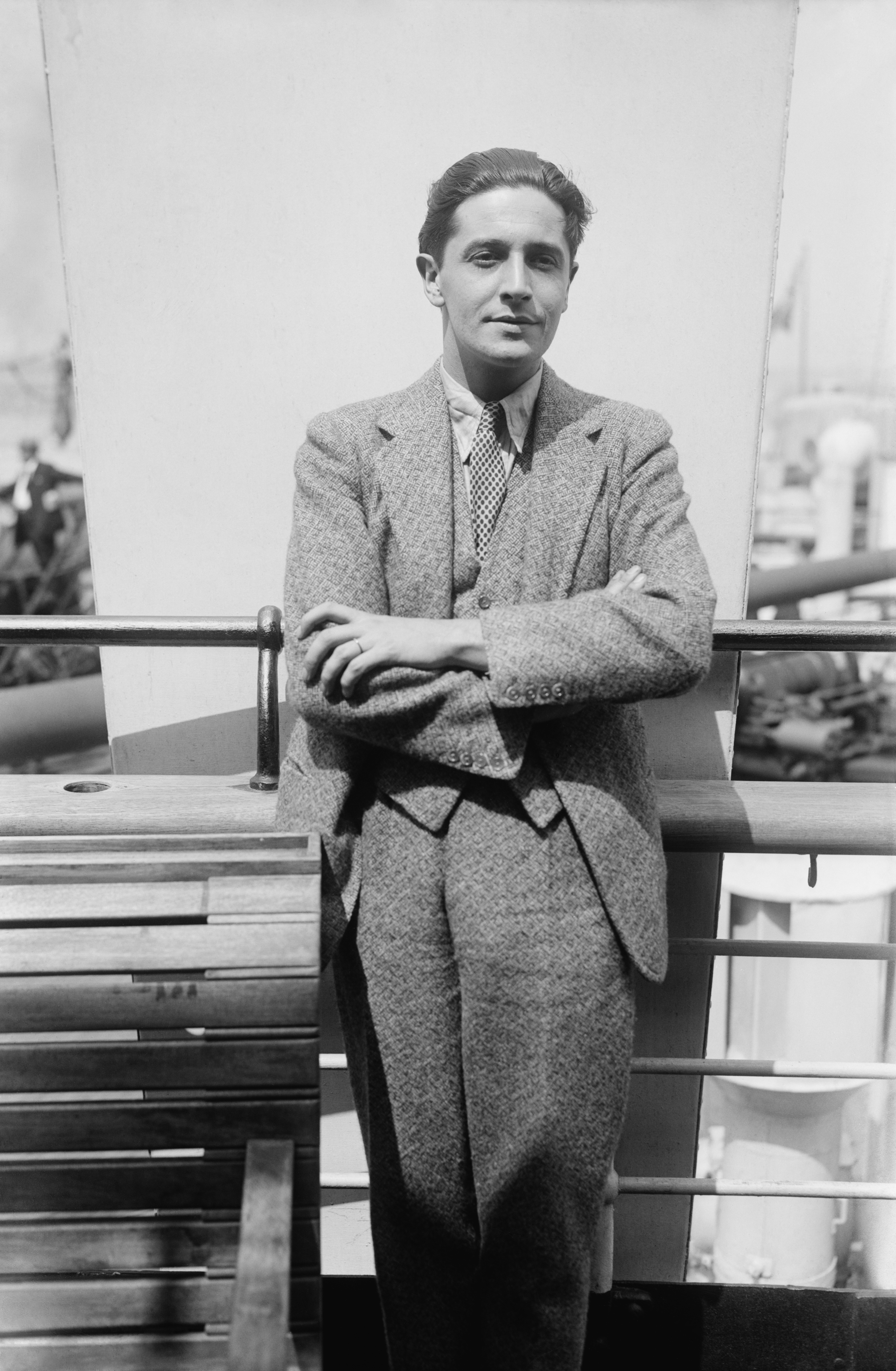
Ivor Novello

Name	Born	Died	Description	Connection with Cardiff	Ref
Shirley Bassey	1937	—	Singer of works such as "Goldfinger", "Big Spender" and "Diamonds Are Forever"	Born in Tiger Bay, Cardiff	
Andy Bell	1970	—	Singer-songwriter, member of Oasis, Ride, Hurricane No. 1 and Beady Eye	Born in Cardiff	
Wally Bishop	1894	1966	Band leader and impresario, commonly known by the stage name Waldini	Born in Cardiff	
Charlotte Church	1986	—	Classical and pop singer of works such as Voice of an Angel, "The Opera Song (Brave New World)" and "Crazy Chick", presenter of The Charlotte Church Show	Born in Llandaff, Cardiff	
Steffan Cravos	1975	—	Welsh-language rapper, member of Gorky's Zygotic Mynci	Born in Cardiff	
Sonny Double 1	1992	—	Rapper	Born in Cardiff	
Dave Edmunds	1944	—	Singer and record producer, member of Love Sculpture, Rockpile and Ringo Starr & His All-Starr Band	Born in Cardiff	
Dyfed Wyn-Evans	1969	—	Baritone opera singer, has performed for companies such as the Welsh National Opera, English National Opera, English Touring Opera and Opera North	Born in Cardiff	
Maureen Evans	1940	—	Singer with Waldini's (real name Wallace ' Wally ' Bishop) Gypsy Band, performed works such as "The Big Hurt" and "Like I Do"	Born in Cardiff	
Patti Flynn	1937	2020	Jazz singer	Born in Cardiff	
Green Gartside	1955	—	Singer-songwriter, lead singer of Scritti Politti	Born in Cardiff	
Frank Hennessy	1947	—	Folk singer, member of The Hennessys and radio presenter on BBC Radio Wales	Born in Cardiff	
Paul Carey Jones	1974	—	Baritone opera singer, has performed for companies such as the Scottish Opera and Northern Ireland Opera, and has been involved in works such as Man on the Moon, The Lighthouse and Nixon in China	Born in Cardiff	
Donna Lewis	1973	—	Pop singer, performed works such as Now in a Minute, "I Love You Always Forever" and "At the Beginning"	Born in Cardiff	
Cerys Matthews	1969	—	Singer-songwriter, lead singer of Catatonia, performed works such as "Mulder and Scully", "The Ballad of Tom Jones" and "Baby, It's Cold Outside"	Born in Cardiff	
Clara Novello Davies	1861	1943	Singer, teacher and conductor, mother of Ivor Novello	Born in Cardiff	
Ivor Novello	1893	1951	Composer, singer and actor, after whom the Ivor Novello Awards are named	Born in Cardiff	
Idloes Owen	1894	1954	Singer, composer and conductor, founder of the Welsh National Opera	Based in Llandaff, Cardiff	
Pino Palladino	1957	—	Bass guitarist with The Who	Born in Cardiff	
Shakin' Stevens	1948	—	Rock and roll singer and songwriter, performed works such as "This Ole House", "Green Door" and "Merry Christmas Everyone"	Born in Ely, Cardiff	
Noel Sullivan	1980	—	Pop singer and stage actor, member of Hear'Say	Born in Cardiff	
Pepsi Tate	1965	2007	Bass guitarist with Tigertailz, and television director	Lived and worked in Cardiff	
Blue Weaver	1947	—	Keyboard player with Amen Corner, Fair Weather and Strawbs, songwriter and record producer	Born in Cardiff	

=== Bands ===
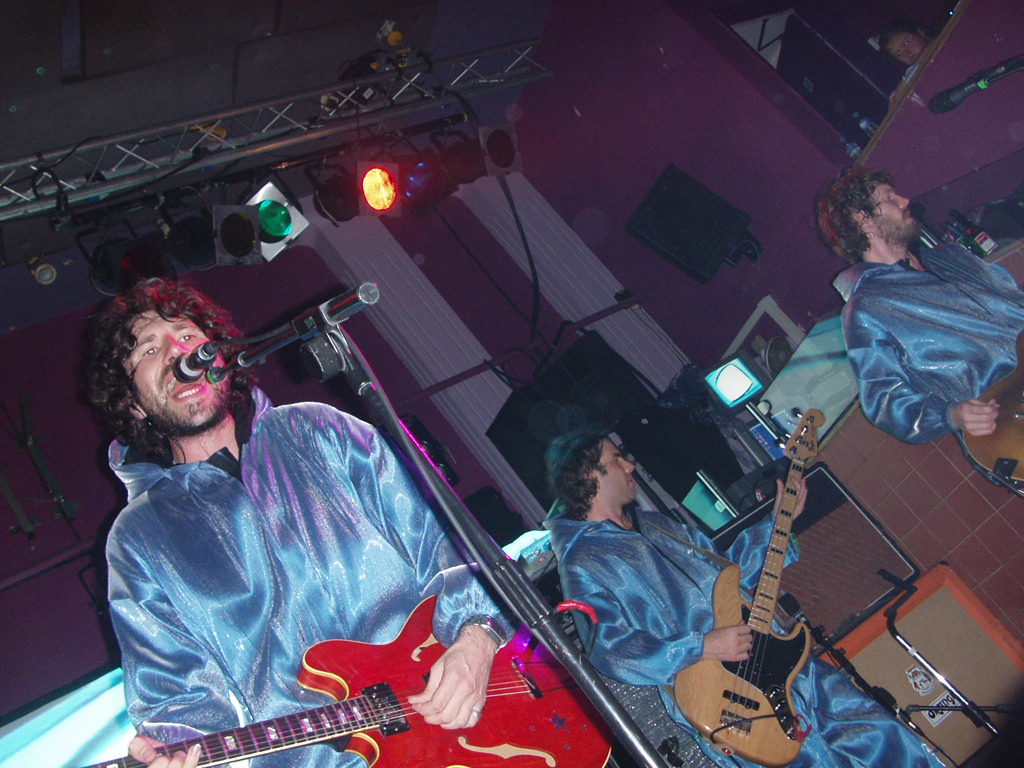
Super Furry Animals

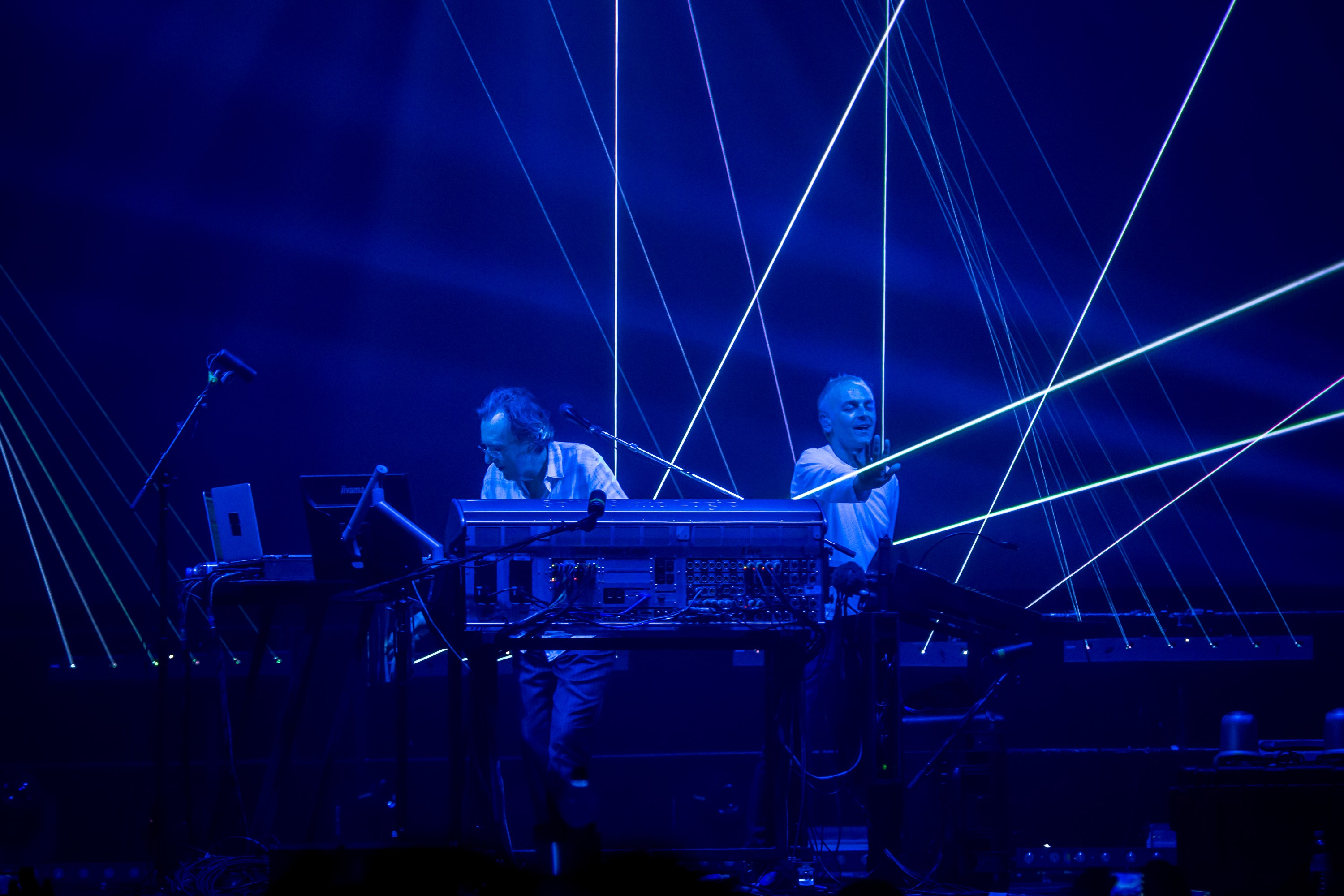
Underworld

Name	Formed	Disbanded	Description	Connection with Cardiff	Ref
Amen Corner	1966	1969	Rock band, performed works such as "Gin House Blues", "Bend Me, Shape Me" and "(If Paradise Is) Half as Nice"	Formed in Cardiff	
Budgie	1967	—	Hard rock / heavy metal band, produced works such as "Breadfan"	Formed in Cardiff	
Catatonia	1992	2001	Alternative rock band, produced works such as "Mulder and Scully", "Road Rage" and "Dead from The Waist Down"	Formed in Cardiff	
Future of the Left	2005	—	Post-hardcore rock band, produced works such as Last Night I Saved Her From Vampires and The Plot Against Common Sense	Formed in Cardiff	
Kids in Glass Houses	2003	2014	Rock band, produced works such as Dirt and In Gold Blood	Formed in Cardiff	
Love Sculpture	1966	1970	Blues-rock band, produced works such as "Summertime", "Wang Dang Doodle" and "Sabre Dance"	Formed in Cardiff	
Los Campesinos!	2006	—	Indie-pop band, produced works such as Romance Is Boring and Hello Sadness	Formed at Cardiff University	
Super Furry Animals	1993	—	Psychedelic rock band, produced works such as "If You Don't Want Me to Destroy You", "The Man Don't Give a Fuck" and "Northern Lites"	Formed in Cardiff	
The Hennessys	1967	—	Folk music band	Formed in Cardiff	
The Hot Puppies	2000	—	Rock group, produced works such as Under the Crooked Moon	Based in Cardiff	
The Oppressed	1981	—	Oi! anti-fascist band	Formed in Cardiff	
Underworld	1980	—	Electronic / trance band, produced works such as "Born Slippy", "Pearl's Girl" and "Caliban's Dream"	Formed in Cardiff	

== Politics and law ==
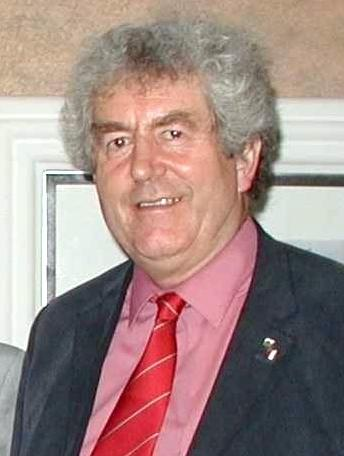
Rhodri Morgan

Name	Born	Died	Description	Connection with Cardiff	Ref
Leo Abse	1917	2008	Former Member of Parliament for Pontypool and Torfaen, noted for promoting private member's bills to decriminalise male homosexual relations and liberalise the divorce laws	Born in Cardiff	
Celia Barlow	1955	—	Former Member of Parliament for Hove	Born in Cardiff	
Donald Box	1917	1993	Stockbroker and former Member of Parliament for Cardiff North	Born in Cardiff	
Stephen Doughty	1980	—	Former member of male a cappella group Out of the Blue, Member of Parliament for Cardiff South and Penarth since 2012	Born in Llandaff, Cardiff	
Maurice Edelman	1911	1975	Novelist and former Member of Parliament for Coventry West and Coventry North West	Born in Cardiff	
Seymour Farmer	1878	1951	30th Mayor of Winnipeg, Canada and leader of the Manitoba Co-operative Commonwealth Federation from 1936 to 1947	Born in Cardiff	
Paul Flynn	1935	—	Member of Parliament for Newport West since 1987	Born in Cardiff	
Cheryl Gillan	1952	—	Member of Parliament for Chesham and Amersham since 1992	Born in Llandaff, Cardiff	
Meredydd Hughes	1958	—	Chief Constable of South Yorkshire Police from 2004 to 2011	Born in Cardiff	
Greville Janner	1928	2015	British Labour Party politician, writer and alleged child abuser	Born in Cardiff	
Jonathan Morgan	1974	—	Former Assembly Member for Cardiff North	Born in Tongwynlais, Cardiff	
Julie Morgan	1944	—	Former Member of Parliament for Cardiff North, and Member of the Senedd for Cardiff North since 2011	Born in Cardiff	
Rhodri Morgan	1939	2017	Former First Minister for Wales, leader of Welsh Labour, Assembly Member for Cardiff West and Member of Parliament for Cardiff West	Born in Cardiff	
Edward V. Robertson	1881	1963	Former United States Senator for Wyoming	Born in Cardiff	
Paul Rock	1996 or 1997	—	Member of the Senedd for Caerdydd Ffynnon Taf	Lived in Llandaff North since 1997	
Alfred Thomas	1840	1927	Former Member of Parliament for East Glamorganshire	Born in Penylan, Cardiff	
Owen John Thomas	1939	—	Former Assembly Member for South Wales Central	Born in Roath, Cardiff	
Eurig Wyn	1944	2019	Member of the European Parliament for Wales	Moved to Cardiff	

== Religion ==
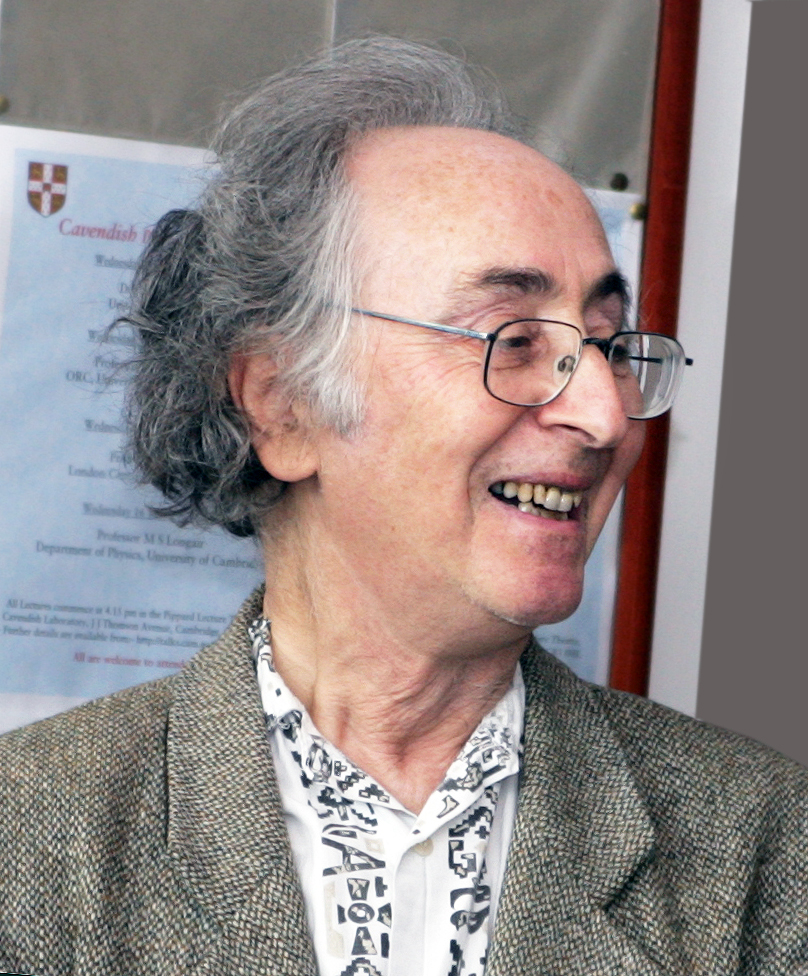
Brian David Josephson

Name	Born	Died	Description	Connection with Cardiff	Ref
Martyn Lloyd-Jones	1899	1981	Protestant Christian minister, influential in the Reformed wing of the British evangelical movement in the 20th century	Born in Cardiff	
Roger Royle	1939	—	Anglican vicar, presenter of the Sunday Half Hour on BBC Radio 2 between 1991 and 2007	Born in Splott, Cardiff	

== Science, technology and medicine ==
Name	Born	Died	Description	Connection with Cardiff	Ref
Wilfred Abse	1914	2005	Psychoanalyst, professor of psychiatry at the University of Virginia from 1962 until 2000	Born in Cardiff	
Matthew Bevan	1976	—	Hacker and computer consultant, arrested in 1996 for hacking into secure US government networks under the handle "Kuji"	Born in Cardiff	
Brian David Josephson	1940	—	Physicist, professor, won the Nobel Prize in Physics in 1973 for the prediction of the Josephson effect	Born in Cardiff	
Judith M. Lumley	1941	—	Perinatal epidemiologist	Born in Cardiff	
Ernest Willows	1896	1926	Pioneering aviator and airship builder, noted for building the Willows airships	Born in Cardiff	

== Sport ==
=== Association football ===
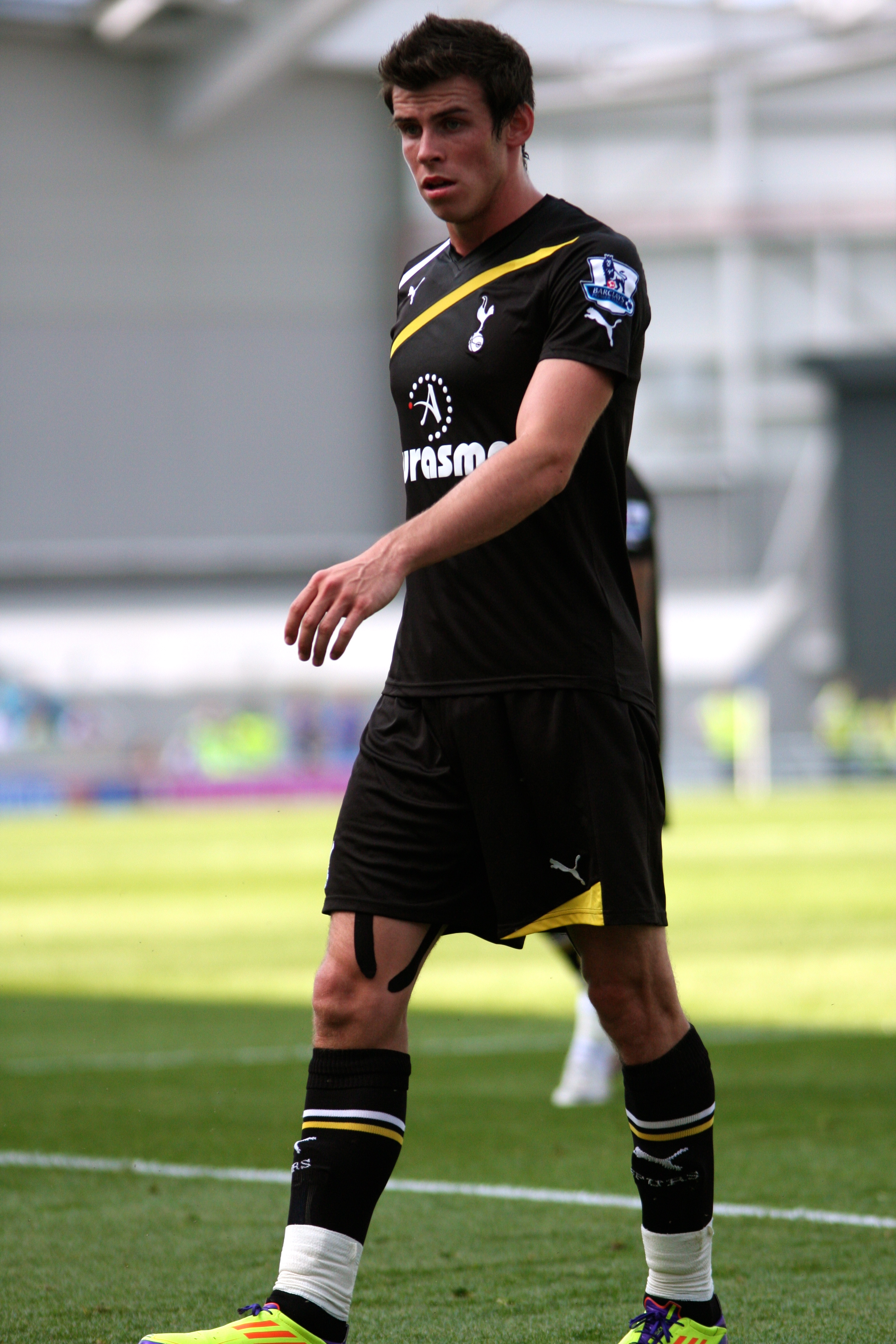
Gareth Bale

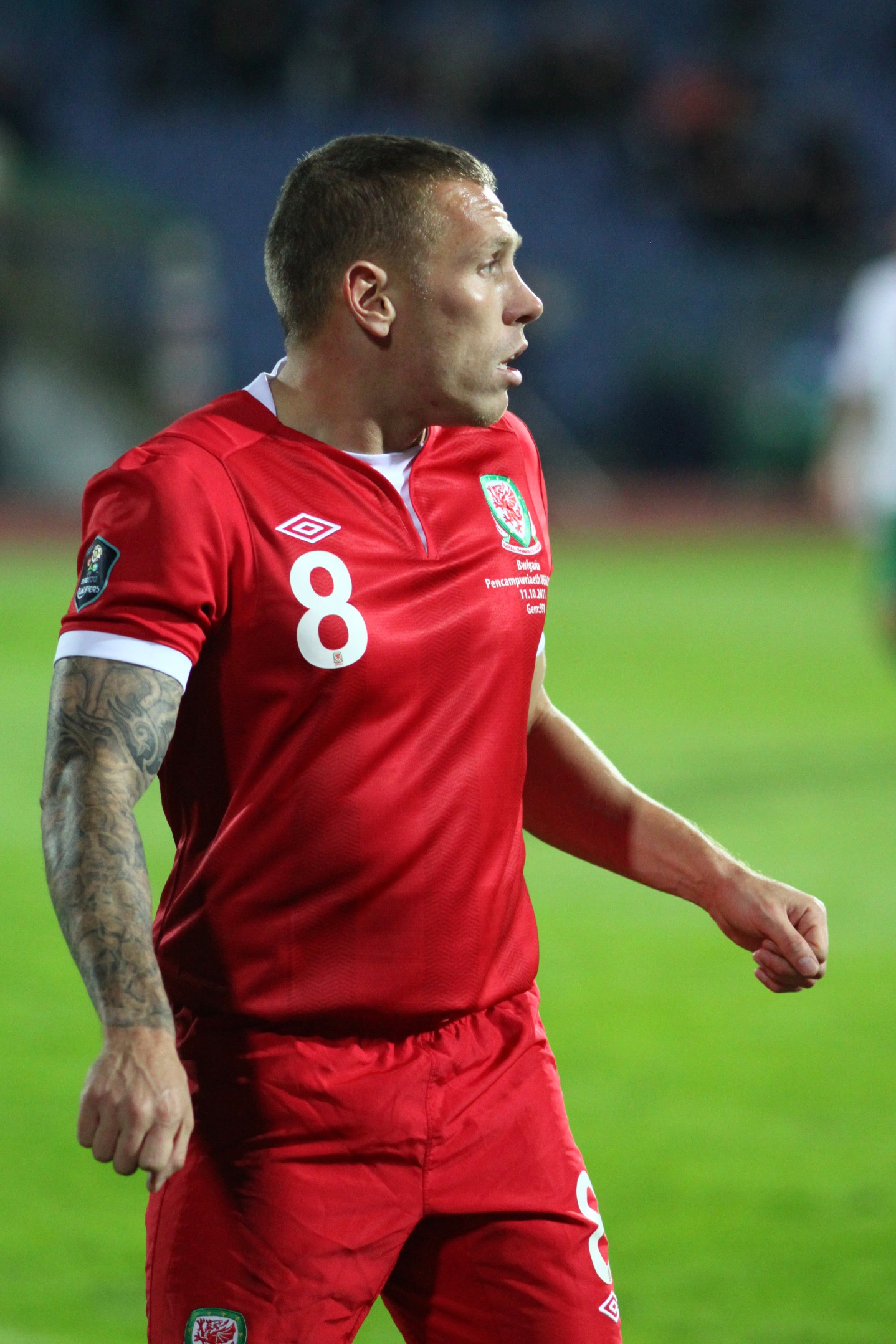
Craig Bellamy

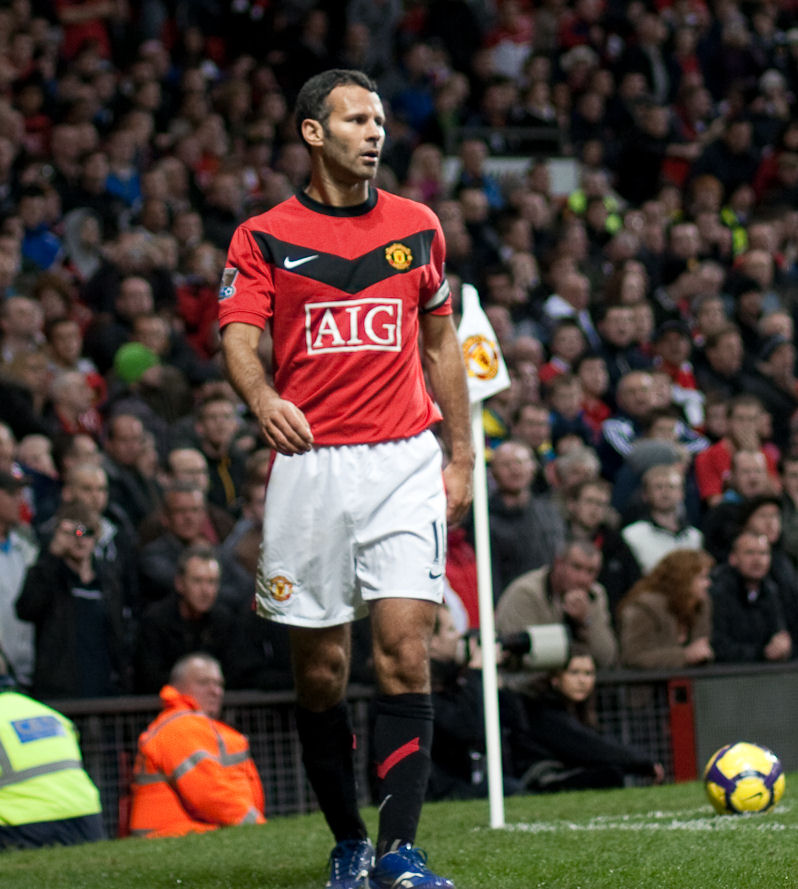
Ryan Giggs

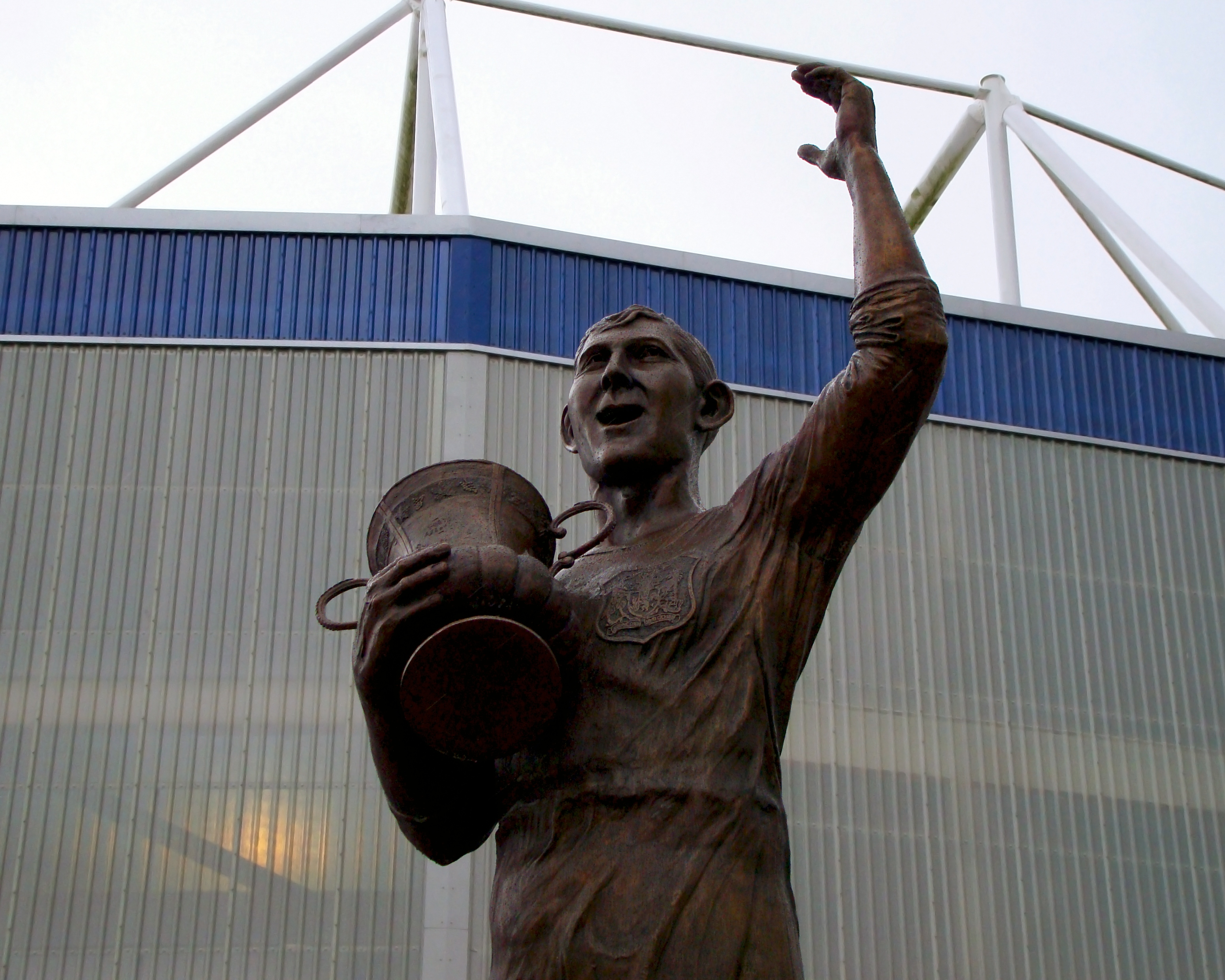
Statue of Fred Keenor

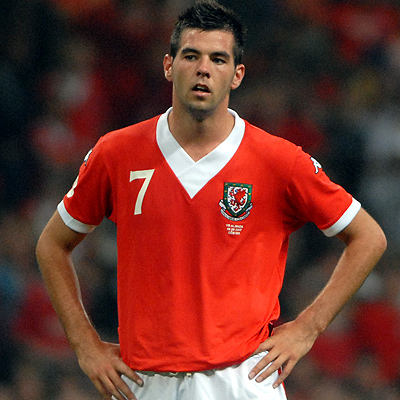
Joe Ledley

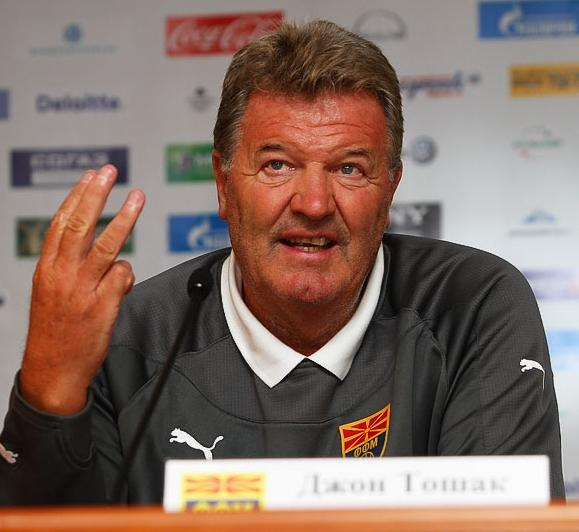
John Toshack

Name	Born	Died	Description	Connection with Cardiff	Ref
Brian Attley	1955	—	Footballer, played for teams such as Cardiff City, Swansea City and Derby County	Born in Cardiff	
Lee Baddeley	1974	—	Footballer, played for Cardiff City and Exeter City	Born in Cardiff	
Colin Baker	1934	—	International footballer, played for Cardiff City and Wales	Born in Cardiff	
Gareth Bale	1989	—	International footballer, youngest ever Wales international, has played for Southampton, Tottenham Hotspur and Real Madrid.	Born in Cardiff	
Phil Bater	1955	—	Footballer and manager, played for teams such as Bristol Rovers, Wrexham and Cardiff City	Born in Cardiff	
Craig Bellamy	1979	—	International footballer, has played for teams such as Norwich City, Newcastle United, Manchester City and Cardiff City, former captain of Wales	Born in Trowbridge, Cardiff	
Jackie Benyon	c.1910	1937	Footballer, played for Doncaster Rovers and Aberdeen	Born in Cardiff	
Tony Bird	1974	—	Footballer, has played for teams such as Cardiff City, Swansea City and Kidderminster Harriers	Born in Cardiff	
Nathan Blake	1972	—	International footballer, played for teams such as Cardiff City, Bolton Wanderers, Wolverhampton Wanderers and Wales	Born in Cardiff	
Paul Bodin	1964	—	International footballer, played for teams such as Cardiff City, Swindon Town and Wales; youth team manager at Swindon Town since 2008	Born in Cardiff	
Nigel Boulton	1953	—	Footballer and manager, head coach of men's soccer team at William Carey University since 2003	Born in Cardiff	
Giorgio Chinaglia	1947	2012	Footballer, played for teams such as Swansea City, Lazio and New York Cosmos	Lived in Cardiff during childhood	
David Cotterill	1987	—	International footballer, has played for teams such as Bristol City, Sheffield United, Swansea City and Wales	Born in Cardiff	
Ernie Curtis	1907	1992	International footballer, played for teams such as Cardiff City, Birmingham City and Wales, member of Cardiff City's 1927 FA Cup winning team	Born in Cardiff	
Arron Davies	1984	—	International footballer, has played for teams such as Yeovil Town, Nottingham Forest, Exeter City and Wales	Born in Cardiff	
Len Davies	1899	1945	International footballer, played for Cardiff City, Thames and Wales	Born in Splott, Cardiff	
Nick Deacy	1953	—	International footballer, played for teams such as PSV Eindhoven, Hull City and Wales	Born in Cardiff	
Bob Delgado	1949	—	Footballer, played for teams such as Rotherham United, Chester City and Port Vale	Born in Cardiff	
Steve Derrett	1947	—	International footballer, played for teams such as Cardiff City, Rotherham United, Newport County and Wales	Born in Cardiff	
Phil Dwyer	1953	—	International footballer, played for Cardiff City and Wales, holds the club's all-time appearance record	Born in Cardiff	
Jermaine Easter	1982	—	International footballer, has played for teams such as Wycombe Wanderers, Milton Keynes Dons, Crystal Palace and Wales	Born in Cardiff	
Herbie Evans	1894	1982	International footballer, played for Cardiff City, Tranmere Rovers and Wales; also played cricket for Glamorgan	Born in Llandaff, Cardiff	
Len Evans	1903	1977	International footballer, played for teams such as Aberdare Athletic, Cardiff City, Birmingham City and Wales	Born in Llandaff, Cardiff	
Phil Evans	1980	—	International footballer, has played for teams such as Bidvest Wits and South Africa	Born in Cardiff	
Chris Fry	1969	—	Footballer, played for teams such as Cardiff City, Hereford United and Colchester United	Born in Cardiff	
Ryan Giggs	1973	—	International footballer, has played for Manchester United since 1990, former Wales captain, most decorated player in British football history; son of Danny Wilson	Born in Canton, Cardiff	
David Giles	1956	—	International footballer, played for teams such as Cardiff City, Swansea City, Crystal Palace and Wales	Born in Cardiff	
Martyn Giles	1983	—	Footballer, has played for teams such as Cardiff City and Newport County	Born in Cardiff	
Ryan Green	1980	—	International footballer, has played for teams such as Hereford United, Bristol Rovers and Wales	Born in Cardiff	
Simon Haworth	1977	—	International footballer, played for teams such as Cardiff City, Wigan Athletic, Tranmere Rovers and Wales	Born in Cardiff	
Ken Hollyman	1922	2009	Footballer, played for Cardiff City and Newport County	Born in Cardiff	
Joe Jacobson	1986	—	Footballer, has played for teams such as Bristol Rovers and Shrewsbury Town	Born in Cardiff	
Paul James	1961	—	International footballer and coach, played for teams such as Toronto Blizzard and Canada	Born in Cardiff	
Fred Keenor		1972	International footballer, played for Cardiff City, Crewe Alexandra and Wales, captain of Cardiff City's 1927 FA Cup winning team	Born in Cardiff	
Joe Ledley	1987	—	International footballer, has played for Cardiff City, Celtic and Wales	Born in Fairwater, Cardiff	
Arthur Lever	1920	2004	International footballer, played for Cardiff City, Leicester City, Newport County and Wales	Born in Cardiff	
Tarki Micallef	1961	—	Footballer, played for Cardiff City, Newport County and Bristol Rovers	Born in Grangetown, Cardiff	
Kaid Mohamed	1984	—	Footballer, has played for teams such as Swindon Town and Cheltenham Town	Born in Cardiff	
Aaron Morris	1989	—	Footballer, has played for Cardiff City, Newport County and Aldershot Town	Born in Rumney, Cardiff	
Kurt Nogan	1970	—	Footballer, played for teams such as Brighton & Hove Albion, Burnley and Preston North End; younger brother of Lee Nogan	Born in Cardiff	
Lee Nogan	1969	—	International footballer, has played for teams such as Oxford United, Watford, Reading and Wales; elder brother of Kurt Nogan	Born in Cardiff	
John Parsons	1950	—	Footballer, played for Cardiff City, A.F.C. Bournemouth and Newport County	Born in Cardiff	
Chris Pike	1961	—	Footballer, played for teams such as Fulham, Cardiff City and Gillingham	Born in Cardiff	
Howard Pritchard	1958	—	International footballer, played for teams such as Bristol City, Swindon Town, Gillingham and Wales	Born in Cardiff	
Gil Reece	1942	2003	International footballer, played for teams such as Sheffield United, Cardiff City and Wales	Born in Cardiff	
Christian Roberts	1979	—	Footballer, has played for teams such as Exeter City, Bristol City and Swindon Town	Born in Cardiff	
Phil Roberts	1950	—	International footballer, played for teams such as Bristol Rovers, Portsmouth, Exeter City and Wales	Born in Cardiff	
Peter Rodrigues	1944	—	International footballer, played for Cardiff City, Leicester City, Sheffield Wednesday, Southampton and Wales, captain of Southampton's 1976 FA Cup winning team	Born in Cardiff	
Peter Sayer	1955	—	International footballer, played for teams such as Cardiff City, Brighton & Hove Albion, Preston North End and Wales	Born in Cardiff	
Damon Searle	1971	—	Footballer, has played for teams such as Cardiff City, Carlisle United and Southend United	Born in Cardiff	
Katie Sherwood	1986	—	International footballer, has played for Cardiff City Ladies, Middle Tennessee Blue Raiders, Bristol Academy, Chelsea and Wales	Born in Cardiff	
Fred Stansfield	1917	2014	International footballer and manager, played for Cardiff City, Newport County and Wales	Born in Cardiff	
Ron Stitfall	1925	2008	International footballer, played for Cardiff City and Wales	Born in Cardiff	
John Toshack	1949	—	International footballer and manager; played for Cardiff City, Liverpool, Swansea City and Wales; managed teams such as Real Sociedad, Real Madrid, Wales, Beşiktaş and Macedonia	Born in Cardiff	
Terry Yorath	1950	—	International footballer and manager, played for teams such as Leeds United, Coventry City, Tottenham Hotspur and Wales; managed teams such as Swansea City, Wales and Lebanon; father of television presenter Gabby Logan	Born in Grangetown, Cardiff	

=== Athletics ===
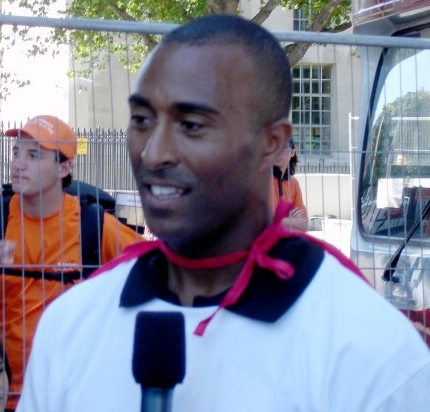
Colin Jackson

Name	Born	Died	Description	Connection with Cardiff	Ref
Steve Barry	1950	—	Athlete specialising in race walking, won a gold medal at the 1982 Commonwealth Games; won the BBC Wales Sports Personality of the Year award in 1982	Born in Cardiff	
Matthew Elias	1979	—	Athlete specialising in the 400 metres, won two silver medals at the 2002 Commonwealth Games and a gold medal at the 2002 European Athletics Championships	Born in Cardiff	
Tanni Grey-Thompson	1969	—	Paralympic athlete and television presenter; won sixteen Paralympic medals (including eleven golds), held over thirty world records and won the London Marathon six times between 1992 and 2002; was made a life peer in 2010	Born in Cardiff	
Colin Jackson	1967	—	Athlete who specialised in 110 metres hurdles and 60 metres hurdles; won a silver medal in the 1988 Summer Olympics, and eleven gold medals in the World Championships, World Indoor Championships, European Championships, European Indoor Championships and Commonwealth Games; held the world record for the 110 metre hurdles for over ten years, and has held the world record for the 60 metre hurdles since 1994; younger brother of actress Suzanne Packer	Born in Cardiff	
John McFall	1981	—	Paralympic athlete specialising in the T42 class 100 metres and 200 metres; won a bronze medal at the 2008 Paralympics and two gold medals at the 2008 IWAS World Games	Based in Cardiff	
Rhys Williams	1984	—	Athlete specialising in the 400 metres hurdles; won a gold medal at the 2012 European Athletics Championships	Based in Cardiff	

=== Boxing ===
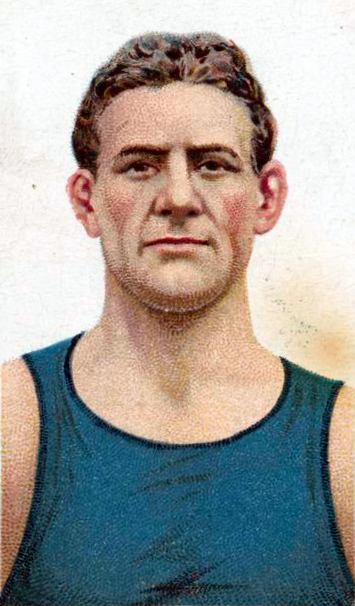
'Peerless' Jim Driscoll

Name	Born	Died	Description	Connection with Cardiff	Ref
Dennis Avoth	1947	—	Boxer, former Welsh Heavyweight Championship; younger brother of Eddie Avoth	Born in Cardiff	
Eddie Avoth	1945	—	Boxer and actor, former British and Commonwealth Light Heavyweight champion; elder brother of Dennis Avoth	Born in Cardiff	
Gary Buckland	1986	—	Professional super featherweight and lightweight boxer, won the 2010 Prizefighter series, British super featherweight champion since 2011	Born in Rumney, Cardiff	
Jim Driscoll	1880	1925	Former British and Commonwealth featherweight champion, first recipient of the featherweight Lonsdale Belt	Born in Newtown, Cardiff	
Joe Erskine	1934	1990	Former British and Commonwealth heavyweight champion	Born in Butetown, Cardiff	
Jack Petersen	1911	1990	Former British and Commonwealth heavyweight champion	Born in Cardiff	
Nicky Piper	1966	—	Former WBA Intercontinental and Commonwealth Light Heavyweight champion	Born in Culverhouse Cross, Cardiff	
Steve Robinson	1968	—	Former WBO Featherweight Champion, named BBC Wales Sports Personality of the Year in 1994	Born in Cardiff	

=== Cricket ===
Name	Born	Died	Description	Connection with Cardiff	Ref
Trevor Arnott	1902	1975	Right-arm fast-medium bowler and right-handed batsman, played for Glamorgan, Marylebone Cricket Club, Monmouthshire and Wales	Born in Radyr, Cardiff	
Pat Brain	1896	1945	Wicket-keeper, played for Glamorgan	Born in Caerau, Cardiff	
Mike Cann	1965	—	Left-handed batsman and right-arm off-break bowler, played for Glamorgan, Orange Free State, Griqualand West, Boland and the Impalas	Born in Cardiff	
Frank Clarke	1936	—	Right-arm fast-medium bowler, played for Glamorgan	Born in Heath, Cardiff	
John Davis	1939	—	Left-arm orthodox spin bowler, played for Glamorgan; elder brother of Roger Davis	Born in Whitchurch, Cardiff	
Roger Davis	1946	—	All-rounder and right-arm off break bowler, played for Glamorgan; younger brother of John Davis	Born in Whitchurch, Cardiff	
John Glover	1989	—	Right-arm medium-fast bowler, has played for Glamorgan since 2011	Born in Cardiff	
Ralph Hancock	1887	1914	Right-handed batsman, played for Somerset	Born in Llandaff, Cardiff	
Ernie Harris	1919	1996	Right-handed batsman and right-arm medium-pace bowler, played for Glamorgan	Born in St Fagans, Cardiff	
Eustace Hill	1869	1933	Right-handed batsman, played for Somerset; elder brother of Vernon Hill	Born in Llandaff, Cardiff	
Evelyn Hill	1907	1953	Right-arm fast bowler, played for Somerset; served in the Somerset Light Infantry in World War II, attained the rank of lieutenant colonel	Born in Cardiff	
Mervyn Hill	1902	1948	Wicket-keeper and right-handed batsman, played for Somerset and Glamorgan	Born in Llandaff, Cardiff	
Vernon Hill	1871	1932	Right-arm fast-medium bowler, played for Somerset; younger brother of Eustace Hill	Born in Llandaff, Cardiff	
Gwyn Hughes	1941	—	Right-handed batsman and slow left-arm orthodox bowler, played for Glamorgan	Born in Mynachdy, Cardiff	
Tom Maynard	1989	2012	Right-handed batsman, played for Glamorgan and Surrey	Born in Cardiff	
Niel Morgan	1904	1985	Right-handed batsman and right-arm medium-fast bowler, played for Glamorgan and Wales	Born in Cyncoed, Cardiff	
Trevil Morgan	1907	1976	Left-handed batsman, right-arm medium pace bowler and occasional wicket-keeper, played for Glamorgan and Wales	Born in Cyncoed, Cardiff	
Hugh Morris	1963	—	Left-handed batsman, played for Glamorgan and England; managing director of the England cricket team since 2007	Born in Canton, Cardiff	
Ricky Needham	1951	—	Left-handed batsman, right-arm medium-pace bowler and occasional wicket-keeper, played for Glamorgan	Born in Canton, Cardiff	
Michael Newbold	1970	—	Right-handed batsman, played for Wales Minor Counties	Born in Cardiff	
Aneurin Norman	1991	—	Right-arm medium pace bowler, has played for Glamorgan since 2011	Born in Cardiff	
Jim Pleass	1923	—	Right-handed batsman, played for Glamorgan	Born in Cardiff	
George Reed	1906	1988	Left-arm fast-medium bowler, played for Glamorgan	Born in St Fagans, Cardiff	
John Riches	1920	1999	Right-handed batsman, played for Glamorgan	Born in Cathays, Cardiff	
Norman Riches	1883	1975	Right-handed batsman, right-arm medium bowler and occasional wicket-keeper, played for Glamorgan, Wales and Marylebone; in 1921, he became the first Glamorgan batsman to pass a thousand runs in first-class cricket	Born in Cardiff	
Billy Spiller	1886	1970	International rugby union player, played for teams such as Cardiff, Pontypridd and Wales; also played cricket for Glamorgan as a right-handed batsman; in 1921, he became the first player to score a century for Glamorgan in first-class cricket	Born in St Fagans, Cardiff	
Cecil Spiller	1900	1974	Right-handed batsman and right-arm medium pace bowler, played for Glamorgan	Born in Cardiff	
Jamie Sylvester	1971	—	Right-handed batsman and right-arm off-break bowler, played for Berkshire, Herefordshire and Wales Minor Counties	Born in Cardiff	
Ryan Sylvester	1975	—	Right-handed batsman, played for Herefordshire and Wales Minor Counties	Born in Cardiff	
Harry Symonds	1889	1945	Left-handed batsman and slow left-arm orthodox bowler, played for Glamorgan and Wales	Born in Cardiff	
Cyril Tamplin	1921	—	Wicket-keeper, played for Glamorgan and Bengal	Born in Cardiff	
Tom Taylor	1911	1970	Right-handed batsman, played for Glamorgan	Born in Cardiff	
Maurice Turnbull	1906	1944	International cricket and rugby union player; right-handed batsman, played for Glamorgan and England, captained Glamorgan for ten seasons; played rugby for teams such as Cardiff, London Welsh and Wales; served in the Welsh Guards in World War II, attained the rank of major	Born in Cardiff	
Huw Waters	1986	—	Right-arm medium pace bowler, has played for Glamorgan since 2005	Born in Cardiff	
Alan Wilkins	1953	—	Left-arm medium pace bowler, played for Glamorgan and Gloucestershire; commentator for SABC, BBC Wales and ESPN STAR Sports	Born in Rhiwbina, Cardiff	

=== Cycling ===
Name	Born	Died	Description	Connection with Cardiff	Ref
Reg Braddick	1913	1999	International road cyclist, founder of Cardiff Ajax Cycling Club, represented Wales in the 1938 British Empire Games	Born in Cardiff	
Paul Esposti	1972	—	Cyclist for Team Legacy Energy, finished 5th in the Road Race at the 1998 Commonwealth Games	Born in Cardiff	
Geraint Thomas	1986	—	Cyclist for Team Sky, has won two Olympic gold medals and three World Championship gold medals, has competed in three Tours de France and two Giros d'Italia. Won the 2018 Tour de France.	Born in Whitchurch, Cardiff	
Luke Rowe	1990	__	Cyclist for Team Sky, finished first in Stage 1 Tour of Britain in 2012 and has enjoyed success at a range of events including third place in the Kuurne–Brussels–Kuurne cobbled classic in 2017. Has competed in three Tours de France and two Vuelta a España.	Born in Cardiff	

=== Rugby ===
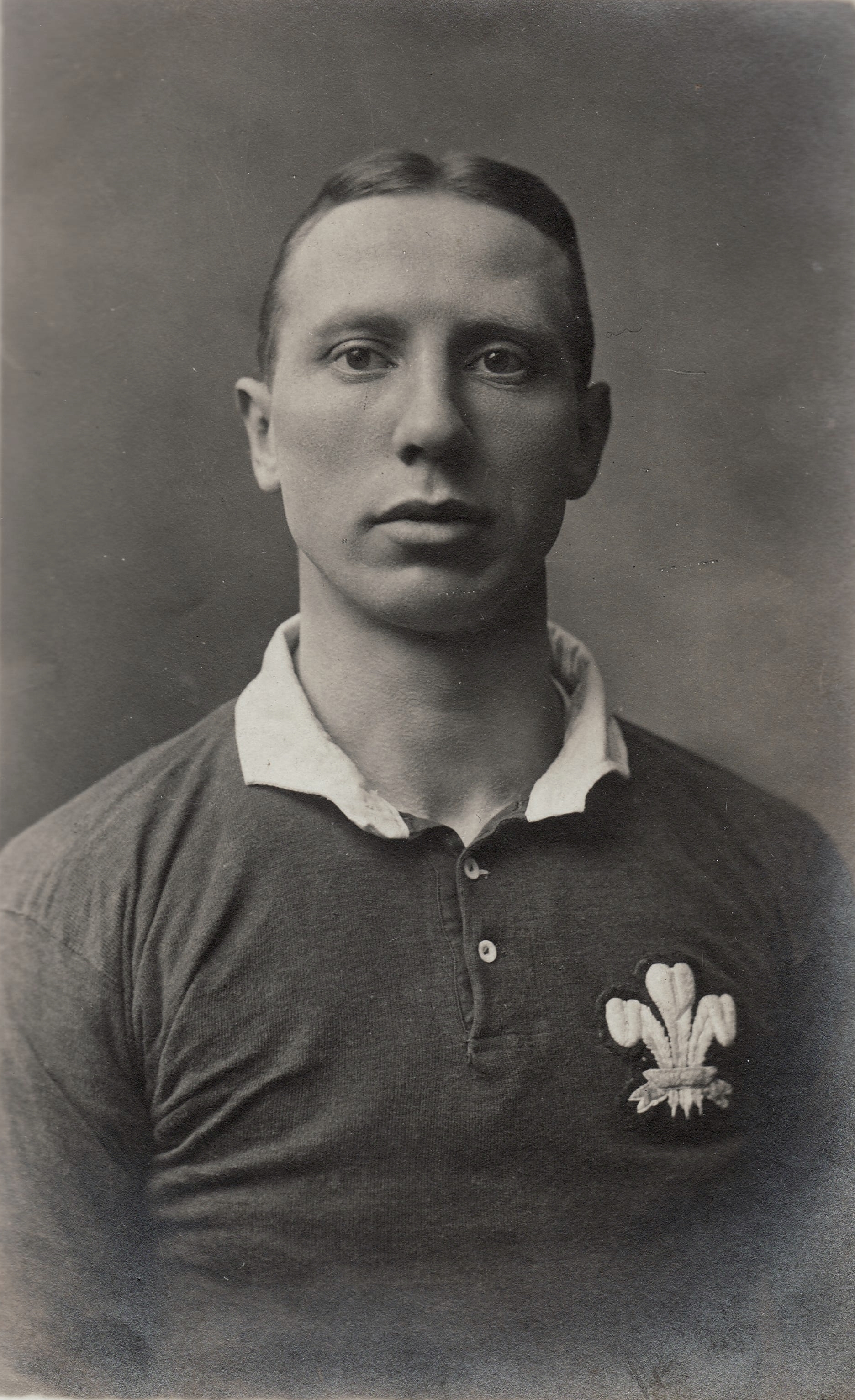
Reggie Gibbs

Name	Born	Died	Description	Connection with Cardiff	Ref
Cory Allen	1993	—	Rugby union player, has played for Cardiff Blues since 2011	Born in Cardiff	
Gareth Baber	1972	—	Rugby union player and coach, has played for teams such as Cardiff, Pontypridd and Newport Gwent Dragons, former head coach of Cardiff Blues	Born in Cardiff	
Billy Boston	1934	—	International rugby league player, played for Wigan and Great Britain, member of the Rugby League Hall of Fame and the Welsh Sports Hall of Fame	Born in Tiger Bay, Cardiff	
Harry Bowcott	1907	2004	International rugby union player, played for teams such as Cardiff, London Welsh, London Wasps and Wales, served as president of the Welsh Rugby Union in 1974–75	Born in Cardiff	
Aled Brew	1986	—	International rugby union player, has played for teams such as Ospreys, Newport Gwent Dragons, Biarritz Olympique and Wales; younger brother of Nathan Brew	Born in Cardiff	
Nathan Brew	1982	—	International rugby union player, has played for teams such as Newport Gwent Dragons, Scarlets and Wales; elder brother of Aled Brew	Born in Cardiff	
John Alf Brown	1881	1936	International rugby union player, played for St Peters, Cardiff and Wales	Born in Cardiff	
Percy Bush	1879	1955	International rugby union player, played for teams such as Cardiff, Wales and British Isles	Born in Cardiff	
Chris Czekaj	1985	—	International rugby union player, has played for Cardiff, Cardiff Blues and Wales	Born in Cardiff	
Colin Dixon	1943	1993	International rugby league player, played for Halifax, Salford, Wales and Great Britain	Born in Butetown, Cardiff	
Steve Ford	1965	—	International rugby union player, played for Cardiff and Wales	Born in Cardiff	
Reggie Gibbs	1882	1938	International rugby union player, played for teams such as Cardiff, the Barbarians and Wales	Born in Cardiff	
Hugh Ingledew	1865	1937	International rugby union player, played for teams such as Cardiff, the Barbarians and Wales	Born in Cardiff	
Gareth Llewellyn	1969	—	International rugby union player, played for teams such as Neath, Harlequins, Bristol and Wales	Born in Cardiff	
Nicky Robinson	1982	—	International rugby union player, has played for teams such as Cardiff Blues, Gloucester, London Wasps and Wales; younger brother of Jamie Robinson	Born in Cardiff	
Billy Spiller	1886	1970	International rugby union player, played for teams such as Cardiff, Pontypridd and Wales; also played cricket for Glamorgan as a right-handed batsman; in 1921, he became the first player to score a century for Glamorgan in first-class cricket	Born in St Fagans, Cardiff	
Clive Sullivan	1943	1985	International rugby league player, played for teams such as Hull FC, Hull Kingston Rovers, Wales and Great Britain	Born in Cardiff	
Maurice Turnbull	1906	1944	International cricket and rugby union player; right-handed batsman, played for Glamorgan and England, captained Glamorgan for ten seasons; played rugby for teams such as Cardiff, London Welsh and Wales; served in the Welsh Guards in World War II, attained the rank of major	Born in Cardiff	
Nigel Walker	1963	—	International athlete and rugby union player; represented Great Britain at the 1984 Summer Olympics in the 110 metre hurdles; played for Cardiff and Wales	Born in Cardiff	
Frank Whitcombe	1913	1958	International rugby union and rugby league player; played for teams such as Cardiff, London Welsh, Broughton Rangers, Bradford Northern, Wales and Great Britain; brother of George Whitcombe, father of Brian Whitcombe and Frank Whitcombe Jr, and grandfather of Martin Whitcombe	Born in Grangetown, Cardiff	
Derek Williams	1924	2014	International rugby union player, played for Cardiff and Wales	Born in Cardiff	
Johnny Williams	1882	1916	International rugby union player, played for teams such as Newport, Cardiff and wales	Born in Whitchurch, Cardiff	

=== Other sports ===
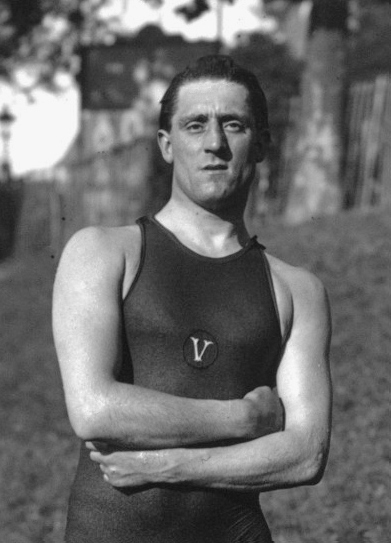
Paolo Radmilovic in 1909

Name	Born	Died	Description	Connection with Cardiff	Ref
Mark Andrews	1992	—	Professional wrestler for WWE; winner of TNA British Boot Camp	Born in Cardiff	
Ian Barker	1966	—	Sailor, won a silver medal in the 49er class at the 2000 Summer Olympics	Born in Cardiff	
David Broome	1940	—	International show jumper; won bronze medals at the 1960 and 1968 Summer Olympics, two World Championship gold medals, and four European Championship gold medals	Born in Cardiff	
Phil Hill	1982	—	Ice hockey player, has played for Cardiff Devils, Sheffield Steelers and Great Britain	Born in Cardiff	
Stevie Lyle	1979	—	Ice hockey player, has played for teams such as Cardiff Devils, Belfast Giants and Basingstoke Bison	Born in Cardiff	
Ted Peterson	1916	2005	Wales international baseball player and former chairman and president of the Welsh Baseball Union	Born in Canton, Cardiff	
Paulo Radmilovic	1886	1968	Water polo player and swimmer, won four gold medals at the 1908, 1912 and 1920 Olympic Games	Born in Cardiff	
Nathan Walker	1994	—	Ice hockey player, has played for National Hockey League (NHL) teams such as the Washington Capitals, Edmonton Oilers, and currently plays for the St. Louis Blues	Born in Cardiff	
George Whitcombe	1902	1986	Footballer and Wales international baseball player; brother of Frank Whitcombe, uncle of Frank Whitcombe Jr, and great-uncle of Martin Whitcombe	Born in Grangetown, Cardiff	
