= Castle of Deception =

Castle of Deception may refer to:

- Castle of Deception (play), a play by Peter Philip
- Castle of Deception (novel), a novel set in the Bard's Tale universe
