= Maureen Evans =

Welsh singer (born 1940)

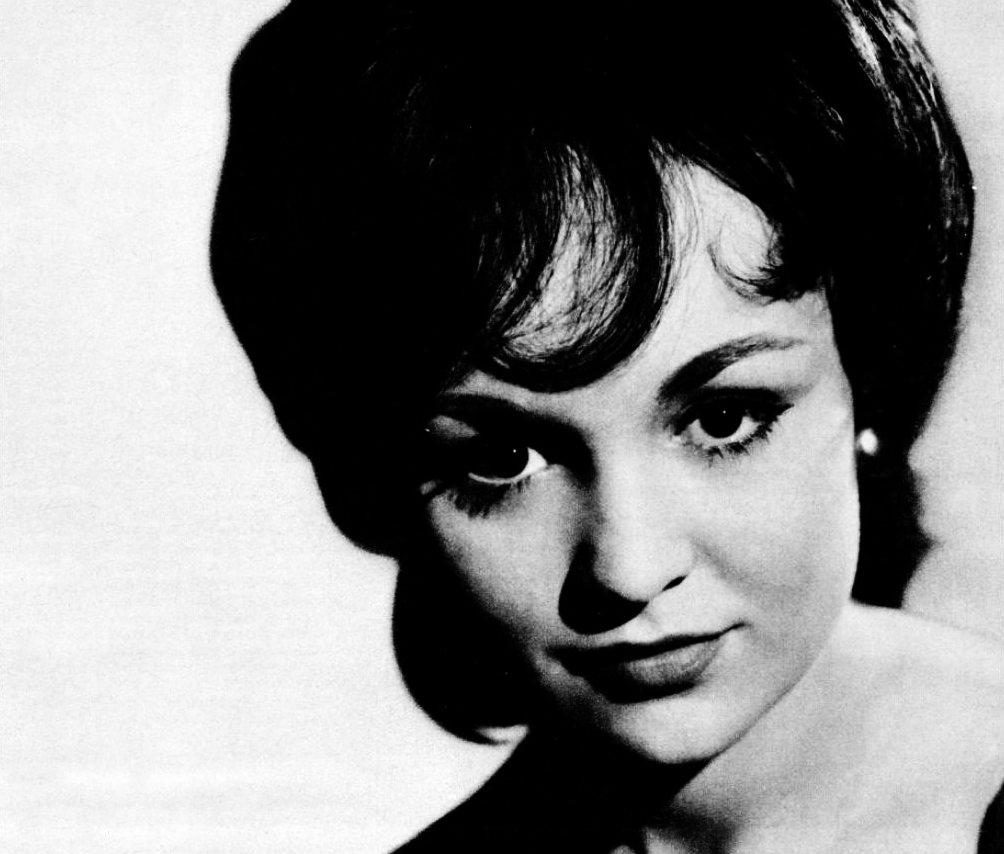
- Maureen Evans in 1964

Background information
- Born: 23 March 1940 (age 86); Cardiff, Wales
- Genre: Pop
- Years active: 1955–1968
- Labels: Embassy; Oriole; Columbia

Maureen Evans (born 23 March 1940) is a Welsh pop singer who achieved fame in the 1950s and 1960s.

== Career ==
Evans career began as a singer with Waldini's Gypsy Band in the mid-1950s, mainly doing summer seasons at UK holiday resorts such as Llandudno. She released her first singles in 1958 on the Embassy Records label.

Evans entered the UK Singles Chart in 1960 at No. 26 with the song "The Big Hurt", but her biggest hit was 1962's "Like I Do", which peaked at No. 3 in the UK in late January 1963 and achieved silver certification for selling in excess of 250,000 copies in the United Kingdom. "Like I Do" was the UK's 43rd best-selling single of 1963, selling in excess of 300,000 copies.

In 1963, Evans competed in the British trials for the Eurovision Song Contest with the song "Pick the Petals", but came in third; Ronnie Carroll represented the UK that year in the competition. She continued releasing singles through the 1960s, as well as one EP (1963's Melancholy Me, on Oriole Records) and an album, Like I Do, also on Oriole (1963). One reviewer noted about one of her latter singles, "Never Let Him Go", that it was "an excellent interpretation of a David Gates song".

She had a total of four UK Top 40 hits and sold over a million records in the UK.

Evans owned the Maureen Evans Theatre School in West Grove, Cardiff, which taught children aged 6 to 18 years old, how to sing, dance and act, from 1998 to 2010.

In 2013, Stage Door Records released Maureen Evans – The Singles Collection, as a digital download on Amazon, iTunes, and Spotify.

Like I Do: The Sixties Recordings was released on 25 November 2016 by RPM Records. This was the first time that Evans' work had been given a licensed CD release. The album contained 31 tracks, which included her best known hits and rare B sides, from her time with both Oriole Records and the UK branch of Columbia Records (now a unit of Sony Music Entertainment), which purchased Oriole in 1964. Evans wrote the sleeve notes that accompany the CD.

== Singles ==
Embassy Records

- 1958 "Stupid Cupid" / "Carolina Moon"
- 1958 "Fever" / "Born Too Late"
- 1958 "Hula Hoop Song" / "Hoopa Hoola"
- 1958 "I'll Get By" / "Someday (You'll Want Me to Want You)"
- 1958 "You Always Hurt the One You Love" / "The Day the Rains Came"
- 1958 "Kiss Me, Honey Honey, Kiss Me" / "To Know Him Is to Love Him"
- 1959 "May You Always" / "Goodbye Jimmy Goodbye"
- 1959 "Lipstick on Your Collar" / "What a Diff'rence a Day Made"
- 1959 "Broken Hearted Melody" / "Plenty Good Lovin'"
- 1959 "Among My Souvenirs" / "Happy Anniversary"

Oriole Records

- 1959 "Don't Want The Moonlight" / "The Years Between"
- 1960 "The Big Hurt" / "I Can't Begin to Tell You" – UK No. 26
- 1960 "Love Kisses and Heartaches" / "We Just Couldn't Say Goodbye" – UK No. 44
- 1960 "Paper Roses" / "Please Understand" – UK No. 40
- 1961 "Mama Wouldn't Like It" / "My Little Corner of the World"
- 1961 "As Long as He Needs Me" / "Where Is Love?"
- 1961 "Till" / "Why Don't You Believe Me?"
- 1962 "My Foolish Heart" / "Oh Gipsy Oh Gipsy"
- 1962 "Never in a Million Years" / "We Had Words"
- 1962 "Like I Do" / "Starlight Starbright" – UK No. 3
- 1963 "Tomorrow is Another Day" / "Acapulco Mexico"
- 1963 "Pick The Petals" / "Melancholy Me"
- 1963 "Oh What a Guy" / "What a Diff'rence a Day Made"
- 1963 "As You Love Her" / "Like You Used To Do"
- 1964 "I Love How You Love Me" / "John John" – UK No. 34
- 1964 "Don't Believe Him" / "He Knows I Love Him Too Much"
- 1964 "Get Away" / "I've Often Wondered"

CBS Records

- 1965 "All The Angels Sing" / "Speak Sugar Speak"
- 1965 "Never Let Him Go" / "Poco Sole"
- 1967 "Somewhere There's Love" / "It Takes A Little Time"
- 1968 "I Almost Called Your Name" / "Searching For Home"

== See also ==
- List of people from Cardiff
