= Tom Taylor (Glamorgan cricketer) =

Welsh cricketer

Personal information
- Full name: Henry Thomas Taylor
- Born: 7 July 1911; Cardiff, Glamorgan, Wales
- Died: 20 July 1970 (aged 59); Pontypridd, Glamorgan, Wales
- Batting: Right-handed

Domestic team information
- Years: Team
- 1932–1934: Glamorgan

Career statistics
Competition	First-class
Matches	3
Runs scored	17
Batting average	5.66
100s/50s	–/–
Top score	16*
Balls bowled	12
Wickets	–
Bowling average	–
5 wickets in innings	–
10 wickets in match	–
Best bowling	–
Catches/stumpings	1/–
- Source: Cricinfo, 13 June 2012

Tom Taylor (born Henry Thomas Taylor; July 7, 1911 — July 20, 1970) was a Welsh cricketer. He was a right-handed batsman who played first-class cricket for Glamorgan. He was born in Cardiff and died in Pontypridd.

Having played club cricket with St. Fagans during the 1930s, Taylor played three first-class matches for Glamorgan between 1932 and 1934, though he had little success with the bat - sixteen of his seventeen first-class runs coming in a single innings. Between 1935 and 1950 Taylor played in at least six Minor Counties Championship matches for Glamorgan's Second XI - and during this decade he also took charge of four matches as umpire.
