= The Hot Puppies =

Welsh band

- Origin: Aberystwyth, Wales
- Genre: Indie rock
- Years active: 2000–2008
- Labels: Fierce Panda, THP
- Spinoffs: Barefoot Dance of the Sea
- Past members: Becky Wood (née Newman); Beth Gibson; Luke Taylor; Ben Faircloth; Bert Wood

The Hot Puppies were a Welsh band formed in Aberystwyth in 2000 and later based in Cardiff. They were signed to Fierce Panda Records. After releasing three albums, they split up in 2008.

== Background ==
Taking their name from the poem "Hymns of Hate" by Dorothy Parker, the band formed in Aberystwyth in December 2000 with a lineup of Becky Newman (later Wood, vocals), Beth Gibson (keyboards, vocals, theremin), Luke Taylor (guitar, vocals), Ben Faircloth (bass guitar), and Bert Wood (drums). Taylor, Faircloth and Wood had previously been members of Soulhive Movement, Gibson played cello in several orchestras, and Wood was the vocalist in LRF (Low Resolution Fox). Taylor was the band's principal songwriter, and was also a member of Hemme Fatale and Face & Heel. Wood's vocals drew comparisons with Gwen Stefani and Debbie Harry, while the band's music was likened to Pulp, Le Tigre, The Muffs, and Television.

After two self-released EPs in 2002, they gained exposure in 2003 playing on a BBC Radio 1 live bill along with The Keys and Gabrielle. The same year, they released their debut single "The Drowning Nymph" on the Remote Control label. Four further singles followed, and in 2005 they toured with Art Brut. They also went on to tour with The Chalets, The Feeling, and The Crimea.

The "Terry" single, released in 2005 on Fierce Panda sublabel Label Fandango, led to the band being signed by the main label. In July 2006 their first album, Under The Crooked Moon was released by the label. It was described by the NME as being "as fantastic as waking up in a sea of Oreo cookies with no option but to eat your way to safety". They recorded a session for Jonathan Ross's radio show around the time of its release. Their second album, a collection of rarities and unreleased tracks recorded between 2003 and 2005 entitled Over My Dead Body, was released in mid-2007 on their own THP Records label, which would be home to all their subsequent releases.

On 29 September 2008, the band released their third and final album, Blue Hands. It includes the singles "King of England"', "Somewhere", and "Clarinet Town". Due to Wood's pregnancy, the band did not extensively tour this album.

"Love or Trial" from Under the Crooked Moon was used during the series one climax wedding scene in the UK BBC3 comedy series Gavin & Stacey.

The band went on hiatus in spring 2008, and never reformed.

Wood and Gibson went on to form a folk trio called Barefoot Dance of the Sea.

== Members ==
- Becky Wood (née Newman) – vocals
- Beth Gibson – vocals/keyboards/theremin/cello
- Luke Taylor – guitar/vocals
- Ben Faircloth – bass guitar
- Bert Wood – drums

== Discography ==
=== Albums ===
- Under the Crooked Moon (24 July 2006), Fierce Panda
- Over My Dead Body (2007), THP
- Blue Hands (29 September 2008), THP

=== Singles ===
- "The Future's Such A Beautiful Place" (2001) (demo)
- "All Washed Up" (EP) (2002)
- "The Drowsing Nymph" (2003), Remote Control
- "Dawn of Man" (April 2004)
- "Green Eyeliner" (2004), Purr
- "Terry" (2005), Label Fandango
- "The Girl Who Was Too Beautiful" (2006), Fierce Panda
- "Green Eyeliner" (7" vinyl reissue) (2006), Fierce Panda
- "How Come You Don't Hold Me No More?" (2007), Fierce Panda
- "The King of England" (2007), THP
- "Somewhere" (2008), Purr
- The Bec & Beth EP (2008), THP – performed by Bec Wood & Beth Gibson only
- "Clarinet Town" (2008), THP (promo only)
- "The Word on the Street" (2008), THP (promo only)
