= Roger Davis (cricketer) =

British cricketer (born 1946)

Personal information
- Full name: Roger Clive Davis
- Born: 15 January 1946 (age 80); Whitchurch, Cardiff, Wales
- Batting: Right-handed
- Bowling: Right-arm off-break
- Role: All-rounder
- Relatives: John Davis (brother)

Domestic team information
- Years: Team
- 1964–1976: Glamorgan

Career statistics
Competition	First-class	List A
Matches	214	122
Runs scored	7,367	1,730
Batting average	21.60	17.30
100s/50s	5/32	1/6
Top score	134	101
Balls bowled	17,208	2,869
Wickets	241	71
Bowling average	32.33	27.49
5 wickets in innings	6	0
10 wickets in match	0	0
Best bowling	6/82	4/48
Catches/stumpings	208/–	44/0
- Source: CricInfo, 12 April 2008

Roger Clive Davis (born 15 January 1946) is a Welsh former county cricketer who played for Glamorgan for 13 years as an all-rounder. While having a quiet career from his debut in 1964 until 1970, he then enjoyed five years of greater success, including scoring over 1,000 runs in the 1975 season, before a rapid decline in 1976 which saw him dropped from the team. He nevertheless enjoyed a successful career, with over 7,000 runs and 241 wickets in first-class cricket. He became headline news in 1971, when a ball hit him on the side of the head while he was fielding in the dangerous "short leg" position, causing his heart and breathing to stop.

== County career ==
=== Early years ===
Born in Cardiff, Wales, Davis attended Blundell's School. His older brother, John Davis, who was born in 1939, also went to school there. Both enjoyed successful sports careers in the school's cricket 1st XI. John Davis debut for Glamorgan in 1959 having graduated from the University of Oxford and played in 13 matches before retiring to teaching in 1967. Roger Davis, in contrast, did not debut until five years after his older brother.

=== Debut for Glamorgan ===
Davis first played for Glamorgan in 1964 as an all-rounder in first-class matches. Batting in the middle of the order and bowling off-spin, he was to move up the order later in his career, he took 241 first-class wickets and hit five centuries. In his first year, he only played one match, scoring three runs, and taking one wicket. In 1967, he played his first List-A match for his county. He was not chosen for the 1965 season, but returned in 1966 for 12 matches, hit 273 runs at 13.00 with one half-century, and taking six wickets at 28.50. The following season was his most successful so far, taking 16 wickets at 22.37 and scoring 373 runs at 12.43 over 19 matches. He also played his first one-day match for the club, scoring five runs, and faced the International Cavaliers on 5 June 1966, scoring 43 before being caught and bowled by Jim Standen.

=== Gary Sobers and the championship ===
In 1968, he came close to preventing the record-breaking 36 runs in one over, scored by Gary Sobers in a match at Swansea, when he caught the ball but fell over the boundary rope, giving Sobers another six. During that season, he scored 877 runs off 22 matches at 21.92, with four fifties, but only took two wickets at 50.50. In one day cricket, he again played only one match, scoring six runs.

In 1969, he helped Glamorgan to their County Championship victory, taking 33 catches, often in dangerous positions close to the batsman. He scored 835 first-class runs at 22.56 including his maiden century, 116. He also took 32 wickets at 23.43, including his first five-wicket haul. He again failed in one day matches, however, playing 15 but scoring only 45 runs at 3.21. He did, however, take 11 wickets at 16.18. Over the winter of 1969/1970 Davis toured the West Indies, however he found playing difficult there during the two first-class matches. He scored 47 runs at 11.75, and took only two wickets at 62.50.

=== Peak ===
The early 1970s, in contrast to his first six years at Glamorgan, were to be the peak of Davis's cricketing career. In 1970, Davis enjoyed a successful season. In 27 first-class matches he scored 823 runs at 20.07, hitting four half centuries for the third time in his career. In one day matches his batting was of a lower standard, however, hitting 101 runs at 9.18 over 14 games. Despite this mixed batting performance, his bowling was at its peak. In first-class cricket, Davis took a career best 54 wickets in the season at 25.42, including career-best figures of 6/82 and one five-wicket haul. This was supported by one day efforts resulting in five wickets at 25.20.

The 1971 season saw both great success and great difficulty for Davis. There was little difference in his one-day bowling, with six wickets at 24.83, and his first-class bowling was greatly reduces, 12 wickets at 35.83. His one-day batting was also fairly average, hitting only 57 runs at 11.40. It was his first-class batting that excelled during the season. Davis hit 528 runs at 25.14, a career best average at that point, and scored his highest first-class total, 134.

In contrast to this success, the most difficult time of his career began in May 1971 during a match against Warwickshire at Cardiff. Davis was struck on the head by a cricket ball, while fielding close to the batsman at short leg. Cricket players wore little protective equipment at the time, and Davis began to suffer convulsions before being given CPR by a doctor from the crowd. He was then rushed to hospital, where it transpired that both his heart and his breathing had stopped when he was hit. After making a full recovery, Davis continued to play for Glamorgan. Later that year, he also played for the England Under-25s.

He followed his career best 134 in the 1971 season with 114 in 1972, ending the season with 617 first-class runs at 22.85, and two half centuries to go with his hundred. He also found some success in his one-day batting, reaching his highest score thus far, 46*, and hit a career best 219 at 16.84. He also enjoyed his second best first-class bowling performance after the 1970 season, this time taking 41 first-class wickets at 37.63, and his best one day bowling figures, 15 wickets at 24.86 with his lowest economy figure, 3.74 runs an over.

Success continued in 1973. Davis took 10 one day wickets at 33.80, and 24 first-class wickets at 29.87. His one-day batting reached its peak, when he hit a career best 101 against the touring West Indies. He finished the season with 291 runs at 29.10, including his one and only one day century. These figures were paired with his 721 runs at 20.60 in first-class cricket, with three half centuries.

In 1974, Davis hit 752 runs at 24.25 and took 22 wickets at 43.45 in first-class cricket. His one-day success continued, with another career best 301 at 17.70, including hit first half centuries. His nine wickets at 44.55 in one day cricket, however, were his worst in terms of average. Good form continued, nevertheless. In 1975, Davis enjoyed his greatest season, hitting 1,243 runs in first-class cricket. These runs came at an average of 31.07, the only time he would reach an average of over 30, and including two centuries, the most of any of his season, and a high score of 131. His one-day batting also reached new heights, with a career best 555 at 27.75 and four fifties. It was only the second season that Davis had scored over 50 in the one day form. With the ball, Davis took 29 first-class wickets at 37.75, with two five-wicket hauls, another career best statistic. In one day matches, he took 11 wickets at 27.72.

=== Decline ===
From 1971 until 1975, Davis had hit 3,861 first-class runs at 24.89, hit four centuries and 17 half-centuries, and taken 182 wickets. His success came to an abrupt end, however, with his form deteriorating rapidly in 1976. While he enjoyed a good average in one day bowling, four wickets at 17.17, three of those came in one match, and he failed to take a first-class wicket for the first time in his career. With the bat, he scored 275 runs at 21.15, with two half centuries compared to the six of the two previous seasons. In one day matches, he scored 150 runs at 18.75, compared to the 555 of the previous season. Glamorgan quickly refused him a contract for the following year, prompting his resignation.

He did, however, return to play for an old Glamorgan team in 1989. On 17 May 1989 old Glamorgan players formed Glamorgan 1969 to face the current team, Glamorgan 1989, in a 30-over day/night match. Davis took three wickets for 44 runs off of four overs, those of Michael Cann, John Derrick and the century maker Matthew Maynard. Davis then opened the batting for Glamorgan 1969 with Alan Jones, scoring three before being bowled by Steve Watkin.
