= Frank Hennessy =

British musician and radio presenter (born 1947)

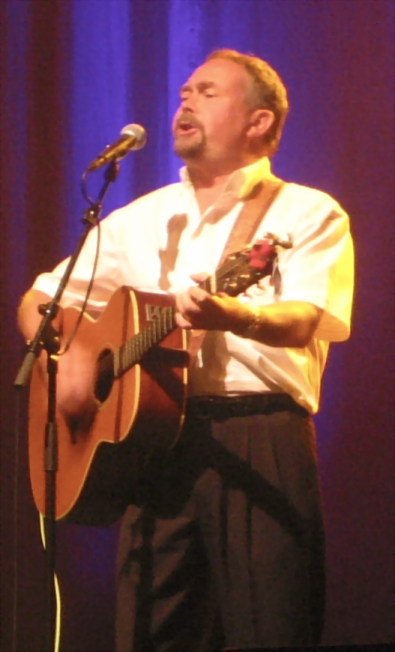
- On stage at the Festival Interceltique de Lorient, Brittany

Background information
- Born: 2 February 1947 (age 78); Cardiff, Wales
- Genres: Folk
- Occupation: Musician
- Instrument: Guitar
- Years active: 1966–present

Frank Hennessy (born 2 February 1947) is a Welsh folk singer and radio presenter.

Born into Cardiff's Irish community, Hennessy was used to performance in front of his family by the time his father gave him a guitar aged 13. Although an apprentice at the time at an electrical contractor, after winning Cardiff Council's 1966 "Spotlight on Youth" talent competition with friend Dave Burns, the pair were persuaded to go professional under the name The Hennessys.

They relocated to Ireland, and developed their sound with Paul Powell. As all three were Welsh, they developed a more Welsh sound and Welsh language base, creating local favourites "Farewell to the Rhondda" (about the decline of the mining industry in Wales and its social consequences), "Tiger Bay" (about emigration from Tiger Bay, the Dockland district of Cardiff) and the capital's anthem "Cardiff Born."

Hennessy's own musical compositions have been recorded by a wide range of artists such as The Fureys, Foster and Allen, Ar Log, Daniel O'Donnell, Diarmuid O'Leary and the Bards and Max Boyce. One of his songs brought Hennessy a number one slot in the Irish Charts when Daniel O'Donnell recorded The Old Dungarvan Oak, a version of Hennessy's The Old Carmarthen Oak.

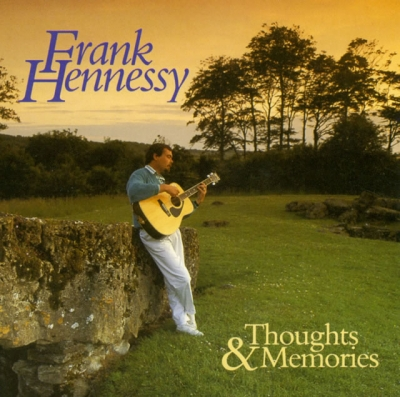
Thoughts & Memories album cover

Hennessy took a break from the music industry in the early 1970s to get married and have a family. In 1978 he was asked to present a programme for the new Cardiff independent radio station CBC, a role he greatly enjoyed. After CBC's collapse and takeover, in 1984, BBC Radio Wales invited Hennessy to act as a stand-in presenter. He also created and presented television programmes including Frank Hennessy's Ireland (2000); Way Out West (1998) (tracing the roots of Cajun, Appalachian and Cape Breton music); and Way Down Under, which took a Celtic look at the music and culture of Australia.

Hennessy currently presents BBC Radio Wales' folk roots and acoustic music show Celtic Heartbeat, and for many years co-hosted the Sunday evening programme I'll Show You Mine with rugby union player Ray Gravell until his death in 2007. Gravell was replaced by singer Amy Wadge.

== Albums ==
- Frank Hennessy – Thoughts & Memories (1987)
