= Under the Crooked Moon =

Studio album by Hot Puppies
- Released: 24 July 2006
- Recorded: 2006
- Genre: Rock
- Label: Fierce Panda

Hot Puppies chronology
Under the Crooked Moon (2006)	2nd Over My Dead Body (2007)

Under the Crooked Moon is the debut album by the Hot Puppies, which features the singles Terry, Green Eyeliner, Drowsing Nymph, The Girl Who Was Too Beautiful and How Come You Don't Hold Me No More. All songs were written by Luke Taylor (The Hot Puppies' guitarist), except Into Each Life Some Rain Must Fall.

== Track listing ==
1. "Terry"
2. "Bottled Ship Song"
3. "Green Eye Liner"
4. "Bonnie and Me"
5. "Drowsing Nymph"
6. "Heartbreak Soup"
7. "Theda Bara"
8. "Girl Who Was Too Beautiful"
9. "Love or Trial"
10. "Love in Practise Not Theory"
11. "Baptist Boy"
12. "How Come You Don't Hold Me No More"
13. "Into Each Life Some Rain Must Fall" (Ella Fitzgerald cover)
