= The Hennessys =

Folk music group from Wales

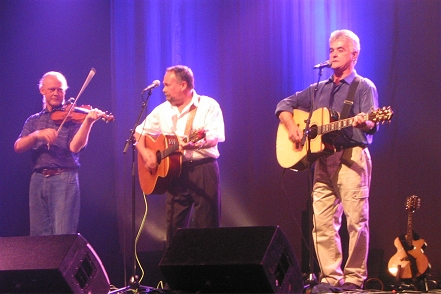
- Iolo Jones, Frank Hennessy and Dave Burns on stage at the Festival Interceltique de Lorient in Brittany

Background information
- Origin: Cardiff, Wales
- Genres: Folk
- Years active: 1967–present
- Members: Frank Hennessy, Iolo Jones, Pino Palladino
- Past members: Paul Powell, Aloma Jones, Tom Edwards, Dave Burns

The Hennessys performing Farewell to the Rhondda

The Hennessys are one of Wales' foremost traditional folk music groups.

== History ==
In 1966, Frank Hennessy and Dave Burns (born David Burns, 4 November 1946, in Cardiff - died 17 December 2023), both from Cardiff's Irish community, won a talent competition organised by Cardiff City Council which persuaded them to take up music professionally shortly afterwards, adding Paul Powell (born in 1946, in Cardiff – died 2007) on banjo and vocals. Having achieved success in the Cardiff area, they decided to spend some time travelling around Ireland, to acquire a wider musical experience. It was at this time that they were persuaded to develop a greater Welsh identity, and they started to introduce traditional Welsh language songs into their repertoire, with great success, and their career took off.

They appeared regularly on television in Wales, appeared on stage throughout the country and recorded several albums. Many of their songs like "Farewell to the Rhondda" (about the decline of the mining industry in Wales and its social consequences), "Tiger Bay" (about emigration from Tiger Bay, the dockland district of Cardiff) and the capital's anthem "Cardiff Born" have become folk standards. Other hits include "The Grangetown Whale" and "Billy the Seal".

The current line-up still includes Hennessy (on guitar) and fiddle player Iolo Jones (born 12 February 1955, in Plymouth, England). Dave Burns, a member until his passing in 2023, was a guitar and mandolin player, and also a singer.

Frank Hennessy has been hosting his own radio programmes on BBC Radio Wales since 1984.

The current member of bass guitarist player Pino Palladino (born 12 October 1957, in Cardiff, Wales) since 2024.

== Discography ==
=== Frank Hennessy ===
- Thoughts & Memories – 1988

=== Dave Burns ===
- Last Pit in the Rhondda – 1986

=== The Hennessys ===
- Down The Road - The Road and the Miles – 1969
- Caneuon Cynnar / The Early Songs – 1993
- Cardiff After Dark – 1984
- Homecoming
