= Like I Do (Nancy Sinatra song) =

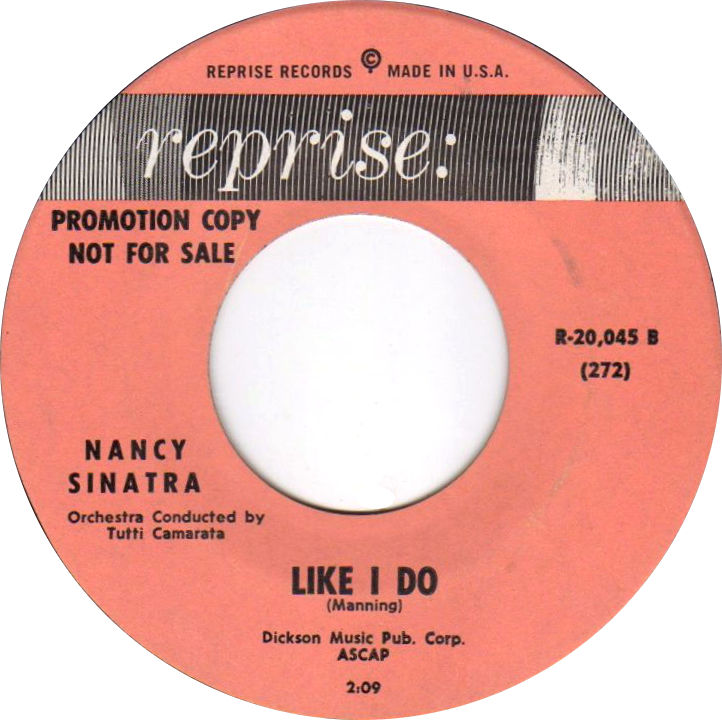
- Promotional copy vinyl record

Single by Nancy Sinatra
- B-side: "To Know Him Is to Love Him"
- Released: 1962
- Genre: Pop
- Length: 2:09
- Label: Reprise
- Songwriters: Dick Manning; Amilcare Ponchielli

Nancy Sinatra singles chronology
"Cuff Links and a Tie Clip" (1961)	"Like I Do" (1962)	"June, July, and August" (1962)

"Like I Do" is a song that was first released in 1962 by Nancy Sinatra. The melody is an adaptation, by Dick Manning, of Amilcare Ponchielli's Dance of the Hours from La Gioconda. The song reached No. 2 in Italy, No. 4 in the Netherlands, No. 6 in Japan, and No. 8 in South Africa.

Later in 1962, Maureen Evans released a version of "Like I Do", which spent 18 weeks on the UK's Record Retailer chart, peaking at No. 3, while reaching No. 5 in Ireland, and No. 7 on New Zealand's "Lever Hit Parade".

In December 1962, Japanese pop duo The Peanuts released a version of the song, which was titled in Japanese "Lemon No Kiss". The song retained a small portion of the song's original English language lyrics, but the Japanese lyrics, written by Minami Kazumi, were completely different.

Teresa Brewer released a version of the song titled "She'll Never, Never Love You (Like I Do)" in 1963. Brewer's version reached No. 122 on Billboard's "Bubbling Under the Hot 100" and No. 13 on Cash Box's "Looking Ahead" chart of singles with potential of entering the Cash Box Top 100.

== Chart performance ==
Nancy Sinatra version

Chart (1962–63)	Peak position
Italy – Musica e dischi	2
Netherlands	4
Japan	6
South Africa	8

Maureen Evans version

Chart (1963)	Peak position
UK – Record Retailer	3
Ireland – The Irish Times	5
New Zealand – Lever Hit Parade	7
