= Waldini =

Welsh musician (1894–1966)

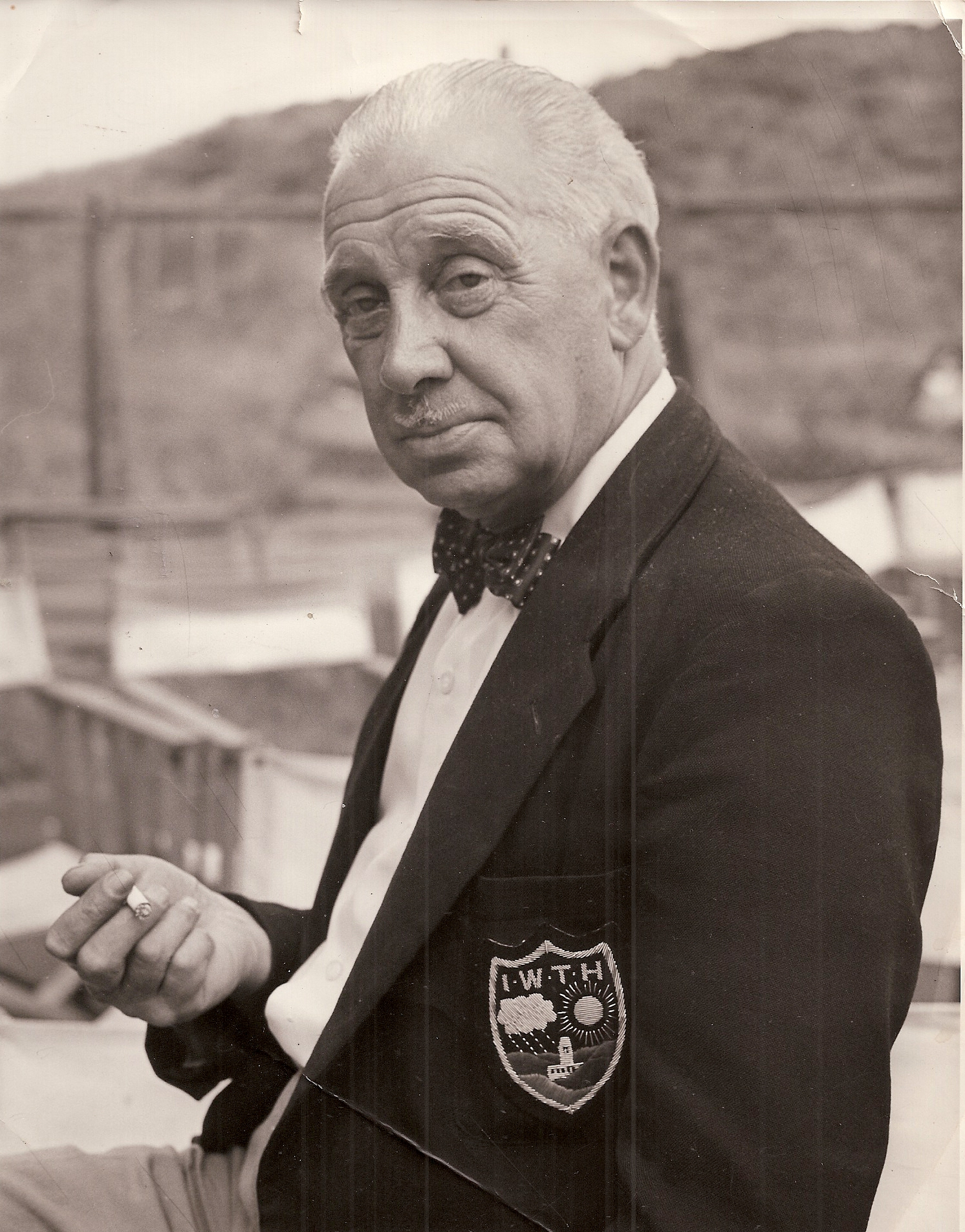
Waldini at Happy Valley, Llandudno 1959.

Waldini (1894 – 5 January 1966) was the stage name of Wallace (Wally) Bishop, a musician, band leader and impresario born in Cardiff, South Wales, in 1894. His career spanned six decades, each providing its own challenges that were met head on by the man known to some as The Great Waldini and to others as Cardiff's Mr Music.

During World War I he served with the Royal Army Medical Corps in Egypt, founding the unit's Welsh Rarebits concert party. After the war he continued his career as a cinema musician, until the "talkies" made his job redundant. He survived the Great Depression by forming an orchestra comprising out of work musicians that played daily in Cardiff's Roath Park. They dressed in Romany outfits and called themselves Waldini and his Gypsy Band

During World War II, he was invited by Jack Hylton on behalf of ENSA, to take his Gypsy Band to entertain the British and Commonwealth Forces at home and abroad; he later wrote of this experience in his self-published book Front Line Theatre.

After the war Waldini and his Gypsy Band appeared during the summer months at holiday resorts throughout the UK, most notably Llandudno in North Wales and Ilfracombe in Devon. For the last two years of his life he toured with his all-female band The Fabs, entertaining troops again, but this time at army bases on the Rhine.

During his career he also found time for talent spotting and in the early 1940s gave Peter Sellers one of his first jobs. Some of his singers also went on to achieve fame, in particular Maureen Evans and Lorne Lesley (longtime wife of David Dickinson) who in 1964 topped the bill on Sunday Night at the London Palladium.

Waldini died in St Winifred's Hospital, Cardiff on 5 January 1966.

== Between the wars ==
He started Cardiff's "Jazz in the Parks" movement in the 1920s by forming his Gypsy Band and hiring other unemployed musicians; crowds flocked to hear these open-air performances. He also ran Sunday concerts at Cardiff's Park Hall, and the public turned up in force to hear these too.

In 1928, Waldini and his Gipsy Band appeared as an entertainment at the British Industries Fair in Birmingham in the West Midlands; the backdrop to the show was the Canadian Rockies, and the 16-piece band included his sister, Marjorie.

He also had shows at Cardiff's Roath Park Pavilion, with singing acts such as the Pereira Sisters; Waldini also signed up 14-year-old "Little Joan", a talented entertainer who played the title role in Red Riding Hood at the Playhouse Theatre in Cardiff in 1933.

== Llandudno ==
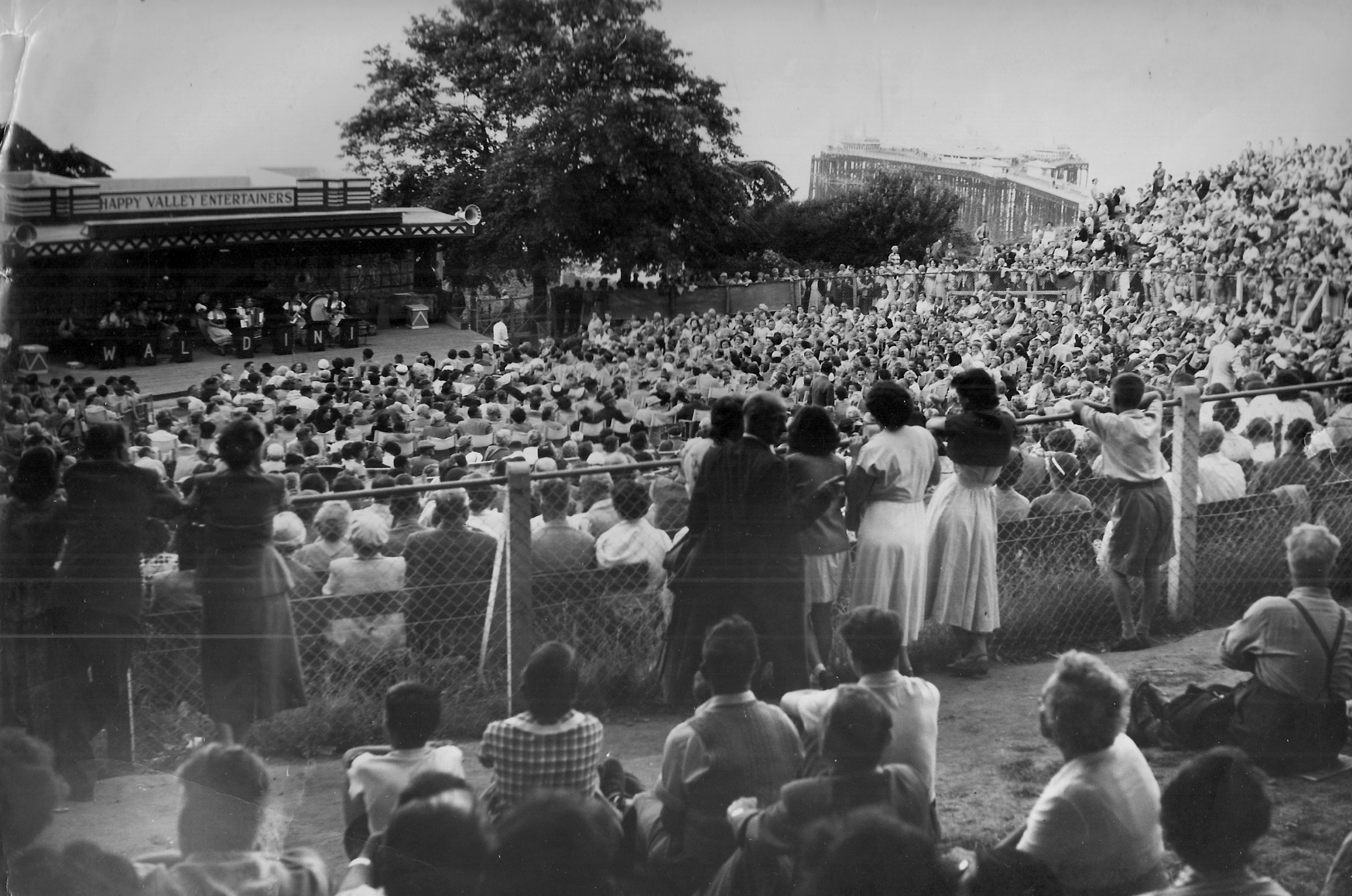
Waldini and his Gypsy Band performing at Happy Valley, Llandudno in about 1956.

Waldini and his Gypsy Band appeared during the summer holidays at Happy Valley in the Great Orme, Llandudno, between 1953 and 1960. There were normally two shows daily, a matinee and an evening performance, at which people could pay for a seat within the "iron curtain" (a low mesh fence around the perimeter of the open-air theatre) or sit and watch the performance free of charge from "Aberdeen Hill", a mound rising to the north of the site.

Being in the open air, Happy Valley was prone to the weather. Waldini negotiated a deal with the Town Council that meant that, in the event of rain, the show would relocate to the Town Hall. He sported a badge on his blazer featuring images of sun, rain and Happy Valley with the inscription I.W.T.H. – If Wet, Town Hall.

== Ilfracombe ==
Between 1961 and 1964 Waldini ran summer seasons at Ilfracombe's Victoria Pavilion, including in 1963 Joy Belles, a variety show that was claimed to be 'in Theatrescope and with Stereophonic sound'. This was achieved by widening the stage by means of booths on either side of the auditorium in which artistes would sing and dance; a duet, say, with one singer in each booth, was truly stereophonic.

During the daytime, Waldini and his Gypsy Band would appear in the open air at the Prom Bandstand. The handbills boasted Audience Participation, Talent Spotting and Novelties, the latter referring to competitions such as knobbly knees in which male holidaymakers would roll up their trousers and ladies chosen from the audience would vote for the man with the most unsightly patellae. It was considered a privilege to win.
