= Peter Philp =

Welsh dramatist (1920–2006)

Denis Alfred Peter Philp (10 November 1920 - 5 February 2006), was a Welsh dramatist and antiques expert, best known for his television series, Collectors' Club.

Philp was born in Cardiff, and attended Penarth grammar school, but opted to enter the family antiques business, A. T. Philp & Sons, instead of going to university. The premises were in Cardiff's Royal Arcade, where they remained until 1968. He served in the RAF during the Second World War, and married Pamela Ayton in 1940. They had two sons. In the meantime, he continued to write plays, as he had done since his schooldays, and his major success was Castle of Deception (1951); this won him the title of Most Promising Young Playwright at the Edinburgh Festival. He lived for a time near Monmouth, but later returned to Cardiff. In 1958, the first programme in the series, Collectors' Club, was shown on television, and Philp also wrote a column on antiques for The Times. He published several books on the subject of antiques.

== Works ==
=== Non-fiction ===
- Furniture of the World (1974)
- The Antique Furniture Expert (1991)
- Field Guide to Antique Furniture (1992)

=== Plays ===
- Castle of Deception (1951)
- A Quiet Clap of Thunder (1961)
