= John Davis (cricketer, born 1939) =

Welsh cricketer (born 1939)

Personal information
- Full name: Francis John Davis
- Born: 26 March 1939 (age 87); Cardiff, Glamorgan, Wales
- Batting: Right-handed
- Bowling: Slow left-arm orthodox
- Relatives: Roger Davis (brother)

Domestic team information
- Years: Team
- 1959: Glamorgan
- 1963: Oxford University
- 1963–1970: Glamorgan
- 1977–1978: Hertfordshire

Career statistics
Competition	First-class	List A
Matches	28	2
Runs scored	552	4
Batting average	16.23	4.00
100s/50s	0/1	0/0
Top score	63	4
Balls bowled	4,290	78
Wickets	52	1
Bowling average	32.57	53.00
5 wickets in innings	2	0
10 wickets in match	0	0
Best bowling	5/67	1/28
Catches/stumpings	17/–	0/–
- Source: Cricinfo, 24 July 2011

Francis John Davis (born 26 March 1939) is a former Welsh cricketer. Davis was a right-handed batsman who bowled slow left-arm orthodox. He was born in Cardiff, Glamorgan.

Davis was educated at Blundell's School in Devon. He made his first-class debut for Glamorgan against the touring Indians in 1959. Later studying at St John's College, Oxford, it was for Oxford University that he made his next first-class appearance for in 1963, against Gloucestershire. He made 13 further first-class appearances for the university, the last of which came against Cambridge University in that same season. In his 14 first-class matches for the university, he scored 363 runs at an average of 21.35, with his only innings of note, a score of 63, came against Northamptonshire. Predominantly a bowler, Davis took 34 wickets for the university, at a bowling average of 30.00, with best figures of 5/67. These figures, his only five wicket haul for the university, came against Cambridge University.

After concluding his studies, Davis returned to playing for Glamorgan in 1963, making 13 further infrequent first-class appearances for the county, with his final appearance coming against Middlesex in the 1967 County Championship. Davis scored 189 runs in his 14 first-class matches for Glamorgan, which came at an average of 11.11, with a high score of 28*. With the ball, he took 18 wickets at an average of 37.44, with best figures of 5/72. His best figures came against Warwickshire in 1966. This innings was also notable for 7 of the 8 wickets to fall going to Davis and his brother Roger.

Davis left Glamorgan at the end of the 1967 season to pursue a career in teaching. He did however appear for Glamorgan in 2 List A matches in 1970, against Northamptonshire and Essex in the John Player League. In the first of these against Northamptonshire, Davis took the wicket of Mushtaq Mohammad for the cost of 28 runs from 8 overs. In the second of these, he bowled 5 wicket-less overs for the cost of 25 runs, while with the bat he scored 4 runs before being dismissed by West Indian Keith Boyce.

Davis later appeared for Hertfordshire, making his debut for the county in the 1977 Minor Counties Championship against Norfolk. He played Minor counties cricket for Hertfordshire in 1977 and 1978, making a total of 7 further appearances.
