= Castle of Deception (play) =

Play by Peter Philp

Castle of Deception is a play by Peter Philp and was first performed on October 16, 1952. It won for its author the title of Most Promising Young Playwright at the Edinburgh Festival of that year.

== Plot ==
The central character lives in a pseudo-Gothic castle full of fake works of art. There he entertains several guests of equally bogus reputation.
