= Whitcombe =

Whitcombe may refer to:

== People ==
- Andrea Whitcombe (born 1971), British distance runner
- Bertie Ernest Hawkes Whitcombe (1875–1963), New Zealand printer and publisher
- Brian Whitcombe (1934–2021), Welsh rugby player
- Charles Whitcombe (golfer) (1895–1978), English golfer
- Charles Arthur Ford Whitcombe (1872–1930), British architect
- Charles Douglas Whitcombe (1835–1902), New Zealand civil servant
- Dave Whitcombe (born 1954), English professional darts player
- Eddie Whitcombe (1913–1997), English golfer
- Ernest Whitcombe (1890–1971), English golfer
- Frederic Whitcombe (1858–1948), Australian politician
- Frank Whitcombe (1913–1958), Welsh rugby player
- Frank Whitcombe Jr (1936–2009), English rugby player
- George Whitcombe (1902–1986), Welsh football and baseball player
- Henry Whitcombe (1900–1984), English military officer and cricketer
- James Whitcombe (born 2000), English rugby player
- John Whitcombe (died 1753), Irish Anglican bishop
- Jonathan Whitcombe (born 1977), English professional wrestler
- Martin Whitcombe (born 1961), English Rugby player
- Philip Arthur Whitcombe (1923–2015), English cricketer
- Philip John Whitcombe (1928–2008), English cricketer
- Philip Sidney Whitcombe (1893–1989), English cricketer
- Reg Whitcombe (1898–1957), English golfer
- Robert Whitcombe (1862–1922), Anglican bishop
- Thomas Whitcombe (c.1763–c.1824), English maritime artist

== Places ==
Antarctica

- Mount Whitcombe, mountain in Victoria Land, Antarctica

New Zealand

- Mount Whitcombe (New Zealand), mountain in Southern Alps
- Whitcombe River, river in South Island

United Kingdom

- Whitcombe, Dorset, England
- Whitcombe, Somerset, England; a place in the UK
- Whitcombe Church, church in Whitcombe, Dorset, England

== Other ==
- Whitcombe and Tombs, a book publisher, stationery manufacturer, and retail bookseller in New Zealand

== See also ==
- Whitcomb (disambiguation)
- Witcomb
