= George Whitcombe =

Welsh footballer and baseball player

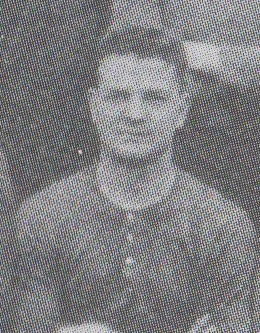
- Whitcombe, 1929

Personal information
- Full name: George Charles Whitcombe
- Date of birth: 21 January 1902
- Place of birth: Grangetown, Cardiff, Wales
- Date of death: 30 April 1986 (aged 84)
- Place of death: Grangetown, Cardiff, Wales
- Height: 5 ft 10 in (1.78 m)
- Position: Half-back

Youth career
- 1921–1922: Grange Albion

Senior career*
Years	Team	Apps	(Gls)
1922–1925	Cardiff City	0	(0)
1925–1926	Stockport County	15	(0)
1926–1930	Port Vale	51	(0)
1930–1931	Notts County	7	(0)
	Ashton National	27	(1)
- Colwyn Bay
Total		73+	(0+)
Relatives	Frank Whitcombe (brother); Brian Whitcombe (nephew); Frank Whitcombe Jr (nephew); Martin Whitcombe (great-nephew)
- * Club domestic league appearances and goals

George Charles Whitcombe (21 January 1902 – 30 April 1986) was a Welsh footballer. He also captained Wales at baseball, winning a total of five caps.

A product of the Welsh club, Bargoed, He was then discovered by the club of his native town, Cardiff City in 1922, before he was sold to Stockport County in 1925. In August 1926, he moved on to Port Vale. He would remain at the club for five years, playing 55 games, as the club topped the Third Division North in 1929–30. On 27 June 1928, George took a break from football to marry Gwendoline Thomas in Grangetown, Cardiff. He was then sold to Notts County in December 1930, a club that won the Third Division South title in 1930–31. He later turned out for non-League sides Ashton National Gas and Colwyn Bay. After retiring, he became a publican.

He was part of a famous sporting family; his brother Frank represented Great Britain and Wales at rugby league, his nephew Frank Whitcombe Jr played rugby union for Bradford RFC and Yorkshire, and his great-nephew Martin Whitcombe played rugby union for Leicester Tigers and England Saxons.

== Football career ==
A "dogged, hard working" right-half, who could also play at centre-half, Whitcombe began his football career with local side Grange Albion in 1921. In summer 1922, Whitcombe signed for First Division Cardiff City. He spent three years at Ninian Park, during which time, in 1923–24, the "Bluebirds" finished second in the Football League. However, following the Welsh Senior Cup tie with Swansea City on 2 March 1925, which Cardiff lost 4–0, he was sold to Stockport County of the Second Division.

The "Hatters" were relegated in last place in 1925–26, and Whitcombe left the club due to a dispute over wages. He played 15 times for County, before joining Port Vale back in the Second Division in August 1926.

He made his Port Vale debut in a 3–1 home win against Southampton on 27 September. He later appeared for the "Valiants" in the FA Cup fourth round clash with Arsenal, which ended in a 1–0 defeat at Highbury, following a 2–2 draw at the Old Recreation Ground. The "Gunners" went on to the final, only to be beaten by Cardiff City. Whitcombe finished the 1926–27 campaign with 24 appearances. He played 14 games in 1927–28, and appeared twelve times in 1928–29, as the club were relegated to the Third Division North. Following the death of manager Joe Schofield, Vale won promotion as the division's champions under Tom Morgan in 1929–30; however, Whitcombe made just the one appearance throughout the season. Despite only playing a further three games in 1930–31, he was sold to Notts County for a 'substantial amount' in December 1930, having played a total of 55 matches for the club (51 in the league).

He made only seven appearances for Notts County, having been sent off, for the only time in his career, in a county cup game against Frickley Colliery, and hit with a month-long suspension as punishment. Despite this, the "Magpies" topped the Third Division South table by the end of the season.

Whitcombe returned to Cardiff, though his playing days were not quite over. He moved to be player-coach to a Cheshire County League club in Ashton-under-Lyne called Ashton National F.C. before ending his football career at Colwyn Bay.

== Baseball career ==
=== Grange Albion ===
In the summer months, George played baseball for Grange Albion, one of Wales's longest-standing and most successful clubs. The club has produced 52 players who have been capped by Wales and no less than 13 Welsh international captains, including George Whitcombe.

During George's time at Grange Albion, the club enjoyed great success, winning the Welsh Baseball Union Cup in 1921–22,1923–24 & 1931–32. The club backed the cup success by winning the Welsh League Championship, the (Dewar Shield) in 1921–22, 1923–24, 1925–26, 1929–30 & 1931–32. After his retirement from Baseball, George Whitcombe became a life member of the Grange Albion Baseball Club

=== Welsh International ===
George Whitcombe won a total of five caps for Wales, all against England. His first cap came at the Cardiff Arms Park Cricket Ground on 2 August 1926, when he fielded at 1st Base and opened the Welsh batting; he made 4 out of 94, and England scored 47 and 43. His second cap came at The Police Athletic Ground (Liverpool) on 30 July 1927, when he batted 6th, scoring 1 and 2; Wales made 48 and 83, England made 41 and 27. He won his third cap on 20 July 1929, at the same ground in Liverpool; he scored 2 and 2 batting second out of 83 and 52 for 5; England made 71 and 62.

He captained Wales at the Old Recreation Ground (home of his then football team Port Vale F.C.) in an international match on 17 May 1930; Wales made 45 and 70, England made 59 and 27. Whitcombe's fourth cap came at The Police Athletic Ground on 11 July 1931, where Wales won 46 and 41 against England's 36 and 17; batting 11th, he scored 6 and 1. His final cap came on 1 July 1933, again at The Police Athletic Ground; he batted first, scoring 0 and 13 out of 33 and 55, but England won with 48 and 43 for 3. Whitcombe's time in the Welsh team was when the sport was at its strongest in both Wales and England.

== Post-retirement ==
At the end of his football career, Whitcombe returned to Cardiff and firstly ran the "Lord Windsor Hotel" in Grangetown, and later "The Ninian Park Hotel" in Leckwith near to Cardiff City's home ground. He then ran the "Coldstream Hotel" at Riverside just outside Cardiff city centre for a twenty-seven-year period between 1937 and 1964.

Whitcombe served in the Home Guard during World War II.

== Family ==
He was one of ten children growing up at 52 Wedmore Road in Grangetown. His father, Frederick William Whitcombe, was a prizefighter in bare-knuckle boxing at Cardiff Docks, known locally as Tiger Bay.

He attended Ninian Park Council School in Cardiff, along with his brother Frank. Frank played rugby league for Bradford Northern and also represented Great Britain. Another brother, Teddy, played baseball for Grange Albion. His nephew, Frank Whitcombe Jr, played rugby union for Bradford RFC and Yorkshire. Another nephew, Brian Whitcombe, was a back row forward for Bradford RFC.

He was also the great-uncle of Martin Whitcombe, who was a prop for the rugby union side Leicester Tigers, and England 'B',

The city of Cardiff celebrated the sporting achievements of eight "local sporting heroes" as part of its celebrations as European Capital of Sport 2014. George Whitcombe and his brother Frank were two of them. On 8 April 2014, their sporting achievements were recognized at an event held in their hometown of Grangetown, in the local library.

== Career statistics ==
Appearances and goals by club, season and competition
Club	Season	League			FA Cup		Total	
Club	Season	Division	Apps	Goals	Apps	Goals	Apps	Goals
Cardiff City	1924–25	First Division	0	0	0	0	0	0
Stockport County	1925–26	Second Division	15	0	0	0	15	0
Port Vale	1926–27	Second Division	21	0	3	0	24	0
Port Vale	1927–28	Second Division	14	0	0	0	14	0
Port Vale	1928–29	Second Division	12	0	0	0	12	0
Port Vale	1929–30	Third Division North	1	0	0	0	1	0
Port Vale	1930–31	Second Division	3	0	0	0	3	0
Port Vale	Total		51	0	3	0	54	0
Notts County	1930–31	Third Division South	7	0	1	0	8	0
Career total			73	0	4	0	77	0

== Honours ==
Port Vale

- Football League Third Division North: 1929–30

Notts County

- Football League Third Division South: 1930–31
