= Philip Whitcombe =

Philip Whitcombe may refer to:

- Philip John Whitcombe (born 1928), English cricketer for Worcestershire and Oxford University
- Philip Arthur Whitcombe (1923–2015), English cricketer for Middlesex
- Philip Sidney Whitcombe (1893–1989), English cricketer for Essex and in India
