= Martin Whitcombe =

English rugby union footballer and coach

- Full name: Martin Alun Whitcombe
- Born: 14 September 1961 (age 65) Keighley, West Riding of Yorkshire, England

Rugby union career
- Position: Prop
Senior career
Years	Team	Apps	(Points)
1981–86	Leicester Tigers	68	(40)
1986–87	Bedford Blues	24	(20)
1987–94	Sale Sharks	151	
1995–98	Leeds Tykes	47	
International career
Years	Team	Apps	(Points)
1982–87	Combined Services	12	(0)
1981–87	Royal Air Force Rugby Union	62	(35)
1985–90	England 'B'	3	
1986–95	England Northern Division	37	
1986–90	Yorkshire	21	
1981–85	Leicestershire	10	
- Father: Frank Whitcombe Jr
- Relatives: James Whitcombe (son); Frank Whitcombe (grandfather); Brian Whitcombe (uncle)

Martin Alun Whitcombe (born 14 September 1961 in Keighley, West Riding of Yorkshire) is an English former rugby union footballer who played in the 1970s, 1980s and 1990s. He coached in the 2000s and became a leading rugby author.

He learnt to play rugby at Keighley RUFC and had a long playing career for Leicester Tigers, Bedford RFC, Sale FC, and Leeds Tykes, at prop i.e. 1 or 3. At a representative level he played for Yorkshire, The Northern Division, and England at 19 Group, Under 23 and England 'B'.

== Early life ==
Martin Whitcombe was one of four children growing up in the family-run business, the Airedale Heifer Inn, a public house in Sandbeds, Keighley, which was run by his rugby-playing father Frank Whitcombe Jr. He attended Crossflatts Primary School, Ryshworth Middle School, and Bingley Grammar School, where he was capped, four times by England Schools 19 Group in the 1980 Five Nations Tournament.

After leaving school Whitcombe joined the Royal Air Force as a physical training instructor. This three-part course included PTI training at RAF Cosford, the Basic Parachute Course at No. 1 Parachute Training School and Adventurous training at Llanrwst in North Wales. After passing out with the rank of corporal, Whitcombe was posted to RAF North Luffenham in Edith Weston and living in the market town of Uppingham. This enabled Martin to accept an earlier invitation to join Leicester Tigers.

== Royal Air Force and Combined Services Rugby ==
While in the RAF Whitcombe won the first of his fourteen caps as an Aircraftman while still under training at RAF Cosford, against the Royal Navy on 28 February 1981 in the Inter Services Tournament at Twickenham & his second cap a week later against the Army.

In July 1981 Whitcombe visited the United States with the RAF rugby team, staying at Bergstrom Air Force Base in Texas the Royal Air Force team won the Austin Rugby Tournament defeating Houston in the final. Here Whitcombe played in the front five with two outstanding Royal Air Force forwards Peter Larter & John Orwin.

During his seven years of service, Whitcombe was part of the Royal Air Force team which went on to enjoy a golden era in the 1980s winning a hat-trick of Inter Service titles: in 1982 (for only the fourth time since 1945), then in 1985, and 1986. (The 1984 title was a triple tie.)

He represented the Combined Services rugby team twelve times, including three games against the very competitive Joinville Battalion of the French Armed Forces. On 29 December 1981 he played against Tony Shaw's Wallabies at Aldershot Military Stadium. Whitcombe played against Canada at the US Portsmouth RFC on 14 October on their 1983 tour on England. On 30 November 1985, Buck Shelford's New Zealand Combined Services team at Devonport Services R.F.C. and he played against Australia at Aldershot Military Stadium on 27 October 1984 against Andrew Slack's Wallabie team.

== Club rugby career ==
Whitcombe joined Leicester Tigers in July 1981. Tigers' coach Chalkie White who was a unique, outspoken coach who demanded high levels of fitness, discipline and progressive rugby, selected him for his first game for the club against Northampton Saints away, on 16 October, he made his home début the following week against Swansea on 24 October at Welford Road and scored a try.

Martin represented Leicester Tigers against the Wallabies at Welford Road on 25 November 1981; the Australian team was Captained by Mark Loane. Whitcombe played twice against the Barbarians during his Leicester career and toured Zimbabwe with Tigers in 1982, playing in both games against Zimbabwe in Harare and Bulawayo. In 1984 he played against The Gulf on the Middle East tour to Bahrain & Dubai and in 1985 to France. During Tigers game against Chambérien Olympique Rugby in an era without the front row replacement system Whitcombe played most of the game with a broken fibula.

Whitcombe left Leicester in 1986 to join Bedford, captained by former Tigers player Andy Key, and played against Kenya in Nairobi as part of the clubs Centenary Season celebrations. At the start of the 1987 season he joined Sale, where he captained the club from 1992 to 1993 and was included on the Sale FC Club Honours Board in 1994. He played in the winning Courage league 1 team in 1993–1994. In 1996 he joined Phil Davies at Leeds Tykes for the last three years of his rugby career playing in two promotion winning teams and played against Tonga at Headingley on 26 November 1997.

In an article for the rugby paper in 2012 former Sale lock Dave Baldwin named Whitcombe as loose head prop in his Sale "dream team".

== Representative honours ==
Whitcombe was capped by Leicestershire in the County Championship his first game was against East Midlands in November 1981. He won his first cap for Yorkshire, against Ulster at Ravenhill in 1986 and scoring a try on his debut. Later that season he played in the 22–11 victory over Middlesex in the 1986–87 Rugby Union County Championship final at Twickenham on 11 April 1987. He went on to make twenty one appearances for Yorkshire in the County Championship.

Whitcombe played for England U23 against England Students at Walsall RUFC on 10 April 1985 after this game he was picked to represent England 'B' for their game against Italy 'B' at Twickenham on 17 April 1985.

After leaving the RAF in 1987, Whitcombe accepted an opportunity to play in South Africa for Durban High School Old Boys, (DHSOB), a club he had represented in 1984.

DHSOB were led by former Natal hooker Don Spiers as chairman the team had some first class players including, the Blakeway brothers, Andrew & Lyle, Peter Edmonds and Greg Hamilton. As a result of Whitcombe's move to South Africa Ian McIntosh the then Natal, (now Sharks), coach picked him to make his debut for the province along with his fellow prop Gerard Harding of Durban Harlequins and Empangeni number 8 Byron Kankowski to play for the provincial side against the touring Pacific Coast Grizzlys at Kings Park Stadium, Durban on 16 July 1988.

The 1988 Currie Cup was the 50th season in the Currie Cup competition since it started in 1889. On 23 July Whitcombe made his Currie Cup debut in Round Nine at home against Transvaal (now the Golden Lions) in the winning Natal team 22–18. In the Transvaal side that day was fellow Yorkshire team mate Peter Winterbottom.

1988 Currie Cup Division A Log
Pos	Team	Pl	W	D	L	PF	PA	PD	TF	TA	Pts
1	Northern Transvaal	12	11	0	1	328	188	+140	35	16	22
2	Western Province	12	10	0	2	379	156	+223	53	15	20
3	South West Africa	12	6	0	6	254	269	−15	27	30	12
4	Transvaal	12	5	0	7	251	253	−2	30	30	10
5	Natal	12	4	0	8	225	292	−67	24	32	8
6	Eastern Province	12	3	0	9	216	332	−116	23	44	6
7	Free State	12	3	0	9	200	363	−163	22	47	6
Northern Transvaal qualified for the Currie Cup final and Western Province qualified for the Currie Cup Semi-final. Free State qualified for the promotion/relegation play-off game. * Legend: Pos = Position, Pl = Played, W = Won, D = Drawn, L = Lost, PF = Points for, PA = Points against, PD = Points difference, TF = Tries for, TA = Tries against, Pts = Log points Points breakdown: *2 points for a win *1 point for a draw

Along with England and Harlequin's No 8 Chris Butcher (Natal) these three players represent only a handful of English players to play in the Currie Cup in the Apartheid era in South Africa. In June 1989 Whitcombe & Winterbottom were due to tour Zimbabwe with Yorkshire. Due to their breach of the Gleneagles Agreement both were declared undesirable alien's Persona non grata by Robert Mugabe's ZANU PF government as a result the tour was cancelled.

Whitcombe played for the Rest v England in the final Trial at Twickenham on 3 January 1987 he was then selected for the England 'B' side to play against France 'B' at Welford Road Leicester, on 3 March 1989.

== Northern Division ==
Together with Sale FC & England 'B' No 8 Andy McFarlane these two players played for the Northern Division for nine years, making their débuts together against the South West Division at Waterloo R.F.C. on 6 December 1986. The North won the Divisional Title in 1986 & 1987 they were runners up to London Division in 1989 & 1990.

Later that year on 19 October 1988 Whitcombe played for Northern Division on the winning side against Nick Farr-Jones's Wallabies 21–9 at Cross Green Otley. Then on 19 December 1989 against the USSR at Aspatria RUFC. Whitcombe played against Namibia in Windhoek in August 1992 as part of the preparations for the forthcoming Springbok tour of England. He played against Wales 'A' at Pontypool RFC on 14 October 1992, prior to playing against Naas Botha's South African Springboks at Elland Road Leeds on 10 November 1992. (This was the first Springbok tour after the Apartheid era.)

With the Northern Division Whitcombe played against Toulon and US Colomiers in August 1993 at Bort-les-Orgues and eighteen months later against Northern Transvaal (now the Blue Bulls) at Loftus Versfeld and against Namibia again at the National Rugby Stadium in Windhoek, in summer 1995.

With the Northern Division he toured Zimbabwe & Namibia in 1992, France in 1993 and South Africa & Namibia in 1995.

== Working in Natal ==
During the 1980s, Whitcombe worked with Zulu civilians to rebuild infrastructure destroyed by local clashes between the African National Congress and the Inkatha Freedom Party in South Africa's black townships. On one occasion, Whitcombe witnessed a necklacing at KwaMashu.

Whitcombe worked firstly in the African townships outside Durban, at KwaMashu in the workers hostels in 'A' section and later 'L' section, and later rebuilding school security fences. Also at Ntuzuma & Umlazi and the locations at Imbali fifteen miles from Pietermaritzburg and Osizweni outside Newcastle, Natal.

Whitcombe also worked in the Indian townships at Chatsworth & Phoenix outside Durban.

== Genealogical information ==
Whitcombe is the son of the former Rugby Union prop for North Eastern Counties, Yorkshire and Bradford RFC, Frank Whitcombe Jr and was the grandson of the former Bradford Northern and Great Britain Rugby league international Frank Whitcombe. He is nephew to the former Bradford RFC back row forward Brian Whitcombe.

George Whitcombe the footballer for Cardiff City, and baseball captain of Wales is the great-uncle to Martin Whitcombe.

He is grandson to the former Rugby League scrum-half for Keighley RLFC Thomas Cockcroft and nephew to the former Keighley RLFC wing William "Billy" Cockcroft

Martin Whitcombe is the father rugby union prop for England (Under-20s) and Leicester Tigers James Whitcombe (born 20 November 2000 (age 25)).

== Life after rugby ==
Whitcombe campaigned for many years for the Royal Air Force to receive official recognition for their many losses on the Keighley town cenotaph. This was finally granted on 10 November 2011 when a stone tablet designed by local artist David Ingham was unveiled by former RAF Bomber Command flight engineer Matt Holiday DFC with his friends Ian Walkden and Martin Whitcombe.

Whitcombe became involved with rugby again in 2006 as a rugby coach at Skipton RFC winning back to back promotions from Yorkshire 3 in 2006–07 and Yorkshire 2 in 2007–08, at Old Grovians RUFC the Yorkshire 4 league title in 2012–13 and Yorkshire 3 League title in 2014–15, and at Bradford & Bingley RFC the Yorkshire 1 league title in 2015–16

In May 2016 along with co Author Bill Bridge, Whitcombe wrote 'The Indomitable Frank Whitcombe'- How a genial giant from Cardiff became a rugby League legend in Yorkshire & Australia, published by St. David's Press, Cardiff

In July 2026 with co Author Huw Richards Whitcombe wrote 'The Indomitables'-The story of the 1946 Great Britain Tour to Australia and New Zealand, published by St. David's Press, Cardiff

In July 2025 Whitcombe wrote 'Chalkie White-A Leicester Tigers Legend, the story of whites 26 year association of the club as player, committee man and coach. published by St. David's Press, Cardiff

== See also ==
- 1981–82 Australia rugby union tour of Britain and Ireland
- 1983 Canada rugby union tour of England
- 1984 Australia rugby union tour of Britain and Ireland
- 1988 Australia rugby union tour of England, Scotland and Italy
- 1992 South Africa rugby union tour of France and England
- 1997 Tonga rugby union tour of Great Britain
