= Isra al-Modallal =

Hamas spokesperson

- Born: 1989 or 1990 (age 35–36); Egypt
- Education: Islamic University of Gaza
- Occupation: Hamas spokesperson
- Known for: First female spokesperson for Hamas

Isra al-Modallal (Arabic: إسراء المدلل) is the first female spokesperson in English for the Hamas government in Gaza between 2013 and 2014. She was born in Egypt and raised in Gaza. She attended high school in Bradford, England, and graduated from Islamic University of Gaza with a degree in media studies. She worked as a broadcast journalist before accepting the spokesperson role. Her appointment was part of a Hamas effort to change its public image.

== Early life and career ==
Isra al-Modallal was born in Egypt to Palestinian refugees and spent her youth in Gaza. She attended Grange Technology College in Bradford, England while her father went to university. She developed a Yorkshire dialect while in England. She graduated from the Islamic University of Gaza with a degree in media studies and later worked as a broadcast journalist. She has credited camera experience at a local station and English-language satellite news channel as formative career experiences.

Al-Modallal began her new role as the Hamas government's international spokesperson in November 2013. She was the first female to hold the position. Her appointment came as part of a Hamas effort change its public image under media head Ihab al-Ghussein, who opened a new government website, increased government social media use, and recruited younger staff. As a female figure in power, her role was expected to more closely connect Palestinian and Hamas concerns with the West and to empower Palestinian women. Al-Modallal has referred to herself as a Palestinian and not as a Hamas devotee. She said she would focus on human rights and humanitarian causes, would not speak with Israeli media, and would launch a social media campaign.

She is divorced, and has one daughter.
