= Ted Peterson =

British baseball player (1916–2005)

Ted Peterson MBE
Personal information
- Nickname: Mr Baseball
- Born: 6 May 1916 Canton, Cardiff, Wales
- Died: 19 December 2005 (aged 89)

Sport
- Country: Wales
- Sport: Baseball
- Club: Penylan

Ted Peterson MBE (6 May 1916 – 19 December 2005) was a baseball (English/Welsh) player, whose unparalleled achievements in the sport earned him the title ‘Mr Baseball’.

A formidable bowler, his international appearances for Wales stretched from the 1930s to the 1960s, and when his playing days were over, he devoted his energies to administration.

== Life and playing career ==
=== Early years ===
Born in Canton, Cardiff, in 1916, Peterson played for school and church teams before breaking into the Penylan side in 1934 – a club he would remain with throughout his career. He spent most of that first season with the second team, but on one first-team appearance, against Splott University Settlement he recorded impressive figures of 8 (men out) for 24 (runs).

=== International appearances ===
In 1935, he became a Penylan first team regular and two years later was called into the Wales national team. He took 6 for 33 in two spells against England in 1937 at Stanley Greyhound Stadium, Liverpool, and was also the top Welsh batsman, with scores of 10 and 4, but it was not enough to help Wales avoid an innings defeat.

After missing the 1938 international through injury, he was back in the team for the 1939 trip to Liverpool, and another Welsh defeat. The Second World War saw him on active service with the Royal Engineers, before returning to civilian life and the Great Western Railway, where he was employed, mainly in the docks, for 51 years.

The first post-war international was the 1948 game in the grounds of Cardiff Castle. Peterson captained Wales and opened the bowling in front of a crowd of 16,000. He got four England players out for no runs and steered his team to victory by 11 runs, thus ending England's five-game winning streak.

The following year at New Brighton, Peterson made his fourth international appearance. As second bowler to Maurice Groves, he finished England's first innings with figures of 4 for 27. He also cemented his reputation as something of an all-rounder: his total of 14 equalled his best international score and took his Wales total to 40 in four games – the average of 10 runs per game being an outstanding figure for a bowler.

Back on home soil for the 1950 international, the game had to be replayed after torrential rain disrupted proceedings at Sophia Gardens. Peterson bowled superbly to take out 8 Englishmen in the first innings and 7 in the second. He also scored 9 in his only innings with the bat to help Wales to a comfortable win.

He played in the 1951 and '52 international wins and was picked as substitute, but not used, in the 1953 game. He captained a Welsh team against the English at Sophia Gardens in 1957 in a special representative match – in addition to the annual international – staged to raise money for the Empire Games funds. His final appearance for Wales came in 1960, and he took 4 for 9 in the first England innings, as the Welsh won at Maindy Stadium, Cardiff.

=== Club competitions ===
In club competition, Peterson's Penylan scored the league and cup double in 1952, beating Splott US in the Welsh Baseball Union (WBU) Cup Final by 79 runs, and there were further successes in both premier competitions through the late 1950s and into the '60s. Indeed, in 1961, '62 and '63 Penylan won the treble of league title, WBU Cup and Welsh National Baseball League (WNBL) Cup.

=== Awards and distinctions ===
He was named ‘unsung hero of sport’ by the Welsh Sports Hall of Fame, and in 1996, at the age of 80, he received the UK national Help the Aged Golden Award for contribution to sport. He died in December 2005, aged 89, still holding the post of President of the WBU.

In 1963, he became chairman of the WNBL, and in 1978 – at the age of 62 – finally hung up his baseball boots. In 1980 he was invited to meet Queen Elizabeth II and the Duke of Edinburgh, who were in Cardiff for its 75th anniversary of achieving city status.

In 1985 he retired after 22 years as secretary of the Penylan club, and became chairman of the new WBU, which at that time administered 72 men's teams, 32 women's teams and 250 junior sides. Stepping down as chairman in 1996, he remained president until his death in 2005. A Wales team selector and member of the International Baseball Board, there is even a cup competition named in his honour. – the Ted Peterson Cup is contested by Welsh men's teams each summer.

== Trivia ==
The racehorse Baseball Ted is named after him and is owned by his son Alan.

== See also ==
- British Baseball
