= Whitcomb =

Whitcomb may refer to:

== People ==
=== Surname ===
- Arthur J. Whitcomb (1886–1942), American politician and lawyer
- Cameron Whitcomb (born 2003), Canadian singer and songwriter
- Christopher Whitcomb (born 1959), American author
- Edgar Whitcomb (1917–2016), 43rd Governor of Indiana (1969–1973)
- Forman E. Whitcomb (1866–1945), American politician and educator from New York
- Ian Whitcomb (1941–2020) an entertainer, songwriter, author, record producer and actor
- James Whitcomb (1795–1852), 8th governor of Indiana (1843–1848)
- John C. Whitcomb (1924–2020), American theologian
- Jon Whitcomb (1906–1988), American illustrator
- Orlan P. Whitcomb (1831–1898), American politician
- R. Steven Whitcomb (born 1948), American military officer
- Richard T. Whitcomb (1921–2009), American aeronautical engineer
- Robert Whitcomb, American journalist
- Sami Whitcomb (born 1988), American-Australian basketball player
- Stanley E. Whitcomb (born 1951), American physicist

=== Given name ===
- Whitcomb L. Judson (1843–1909), American inventor of the zipper
- James Whitcomb Riley (1849–1916), American writer and poet

== Places ==
- Whitcomb, Indiana
- Whitcomb, West Virginia
- Whitcomb, Wisconsin
- Whitcomb Heights, Indiana

== Other ==
- Whitcomb Locomotive Works

== See also ==
- Whitcombe (disambiguation)
- Witcomb
