= Co-op Academy Grange =

Location
- Haycliffe Lane; Bradford, West Yorkshire, BD5 9ET; England
- 53.7745°N 1.7786°W

Information
- Type: Academy
- Local authority: Bradford
- Trust: The Co-operative Academies Trust
- Department for Education URN: 147177 Tables
- Ofsted: Reports
- Headteacher: Sam Moncaster
- Gender: Coeducational
- Age: 11 to 16
- Website: https://grange.coopacademies.co.uk/

Co-op Academy Grange is a coeducational secondary school located in south Bradford, West Yorkshire, England.

== History ==
=== Grammar school ===
The school was originally known as Grange High School, becoming Grange Boys' Grammar School and Grange Girls' Grammar School.

=== Comprehensive ===
It became a comprehensive school.

=== Academy ===
Grange Technology college became an academy in 2013. The college went through a transitional period in 2011 where it moved to a new advanced facility managed by Amey, the investment reportedly costing around 50 million pounds. The transition oversaw the conjoining of two educational institutes into what is now Southfield Grange, Southfield school and Grange Technology College now both exist as Co-op academies now having joined the Co-op Academies Trust recently in 2019.

== Admissions ==
It is currently over-subscribed and serves over 1,850 pupils (with over 300 in the sixth form) from a wide variety of ethnic backgrounds. The majority of pupils are of South Asian heritage. The current (2016) headteacher is Ms Mander.

In May 2023 Ofsted rated the school as "inadequate".

== Facilities ==
In June 2011 Grange moved into their new building which is shared by Southfield Special School. The name of both schools were combined to create the campus known as Southfield Grange.

== Notable former pupils ==
Edward Petherbridge

=== Grange Boys' Grammar School ===
- Stanley Ellis (linguist)
- Edward Petherbridge, actor, married to the actress Emily Richard
- Peter Harrison (rugby player)
- Arthur Tiley, Conservative MP from 1955 to 1966 for Bradford West
- Frank Whitcombe Jr, rugby player

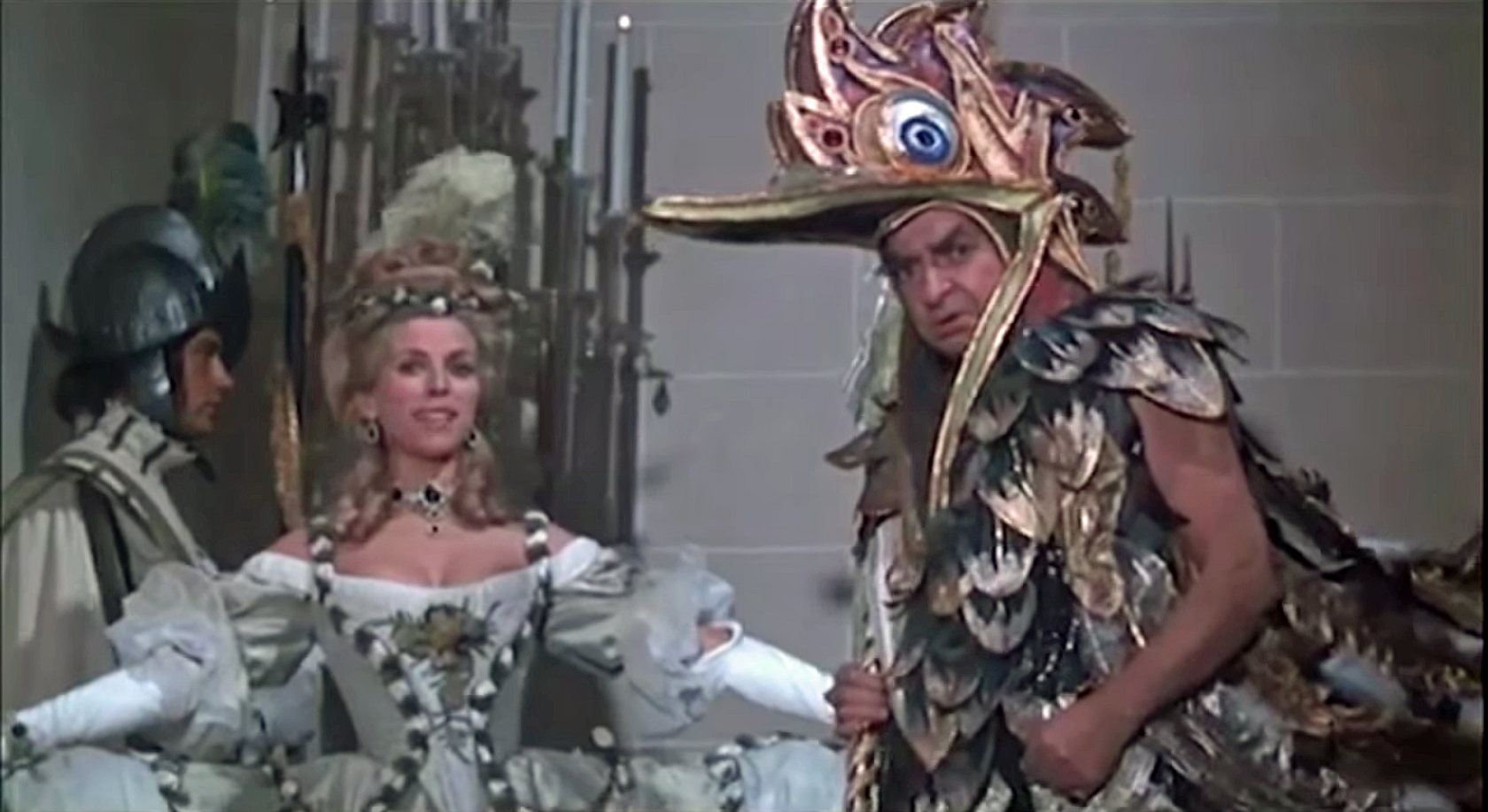
Billie Whitelaw in the 1970 Start the Revolution Without Me

=== Grange Girls' Grammar School ===
- Billie Whitelaw, actress

=== Grange Upper School ===
- Tasmin Archer, musician known for 1992 Sleeping Satellite
