= Welsh Ladies Baseball Union =

Welsh women's traditional baseball body

- Sport: British baseball
- Abbreviation: WLBU
- Founded: 2006
- Headquarters: Grangetown Catholic Club
- Location: Grangetown, Cardiff
- President: Sylvia Goodman
- Chairperson: Terry Webber
- Secretary: Jackie Hancock

Official website
- www.wlbu.co.uk
- (Wales)

The Welsh Ladies Baseball Union (WLBU) is the governing body of the traditional code of women's British baseball in Wales. It was formed in 2006 when the WLBU decided to break away from the men's WBU (formed 1892).

The WLBU headquarters are at the Grangetown Catholic Club, Grangetown, Cardiff.

== See also ==
- Welsh Baseball Union
