= Paddy Hennessey =

Richard Christopher "Paddy" Hennessey (6 January 1929 – August 2016) was a baseball (British/Welsh) player, famed for his high-speed bowling.

== Life and playing career ==
Born in County Cork, Ireland, Hennessey's early sports were hurling and Gaelic football, but having emigrated to Wales, he used to watch his factory co-workers in Cardiff playing baseball in their breaks. At 21, he played his first competitive game for the works team. He removed St Mary's of Canton for no runs and 13 extras. After a couple of seasons in the lower levels of the league, he was signed by Splott US (University Settlement), and he was an instant success at the top level.

In 1957 he made his debut for Wales in the annual international against England, in Liverpool. He opened the bowling and had the English at 33 for 7, but was removed after a protest over his bowling style and a series of no-balls was called. He was again selected for the 1958 international match at Maindy Stadium, Cardiff, and he bowled England out for just 17 in their second innings, taking Wales to a comfortable win. He was named Welsh Baseball Union player of the year.

By 1962, he had joined Grange Albion, and in that year's international he dismissed England for just 11 in their first innings and 14 in the second, with only four batsmen hitting the ball. Two years later, his performance in the international was even more impressive, removing England for just 6 runs in their first innings, a feat which again helped him to the WBU player of the year award, becoming the first man to achieve the honour twice.

His devastating form came to the attention of Wales' first-class cricket team, Glamorgan County Cricket Club, who considered that a super-fast underarm bowler could give them an advantage in the new limited overs version of their game. As the first round of the new Gillette Cup loomed, captain Ossie Wheatley invited Hennessey for a trial in the nets at Cardiff Arms Park, with the thought of recruiting him as a "secret weapon". However, the trajectory of a baseball delivery and the trajectory of a cricket delivery were incompatible.

== Trivia ==
Paddy Hennessey is mentioned in "The Baseball Song" by The Hennessys on their album Cardiff After Dark.

== See also ==
- British Baseball
