= Witcomb =

Witcomb is a surname. Notable people with the surname include:

- Alexander Witcomb (1838–1905), British photographer
- Bethan Witcomb, British actress
- Doug Witcomb (1918–1999), British football player
- Nan Witcomb (1928–2023), Australian poet

== Other ==
- Witcomb Court, housing project in Richmond, Virginia
- Witcomb Cycles, British company

== See also ==
- Whitcomb (disambiguation)
- Whitcombe (disambiguation)
