= Herbert Smith (aircraft designer) =

British aircraft designer

- Born: 1 May 1889; Bradley, North Yorkshire, England
- Died: 1977 (aged 87–88)
- Occupation: Aircraft designer
- Known for: Sopwith Camel

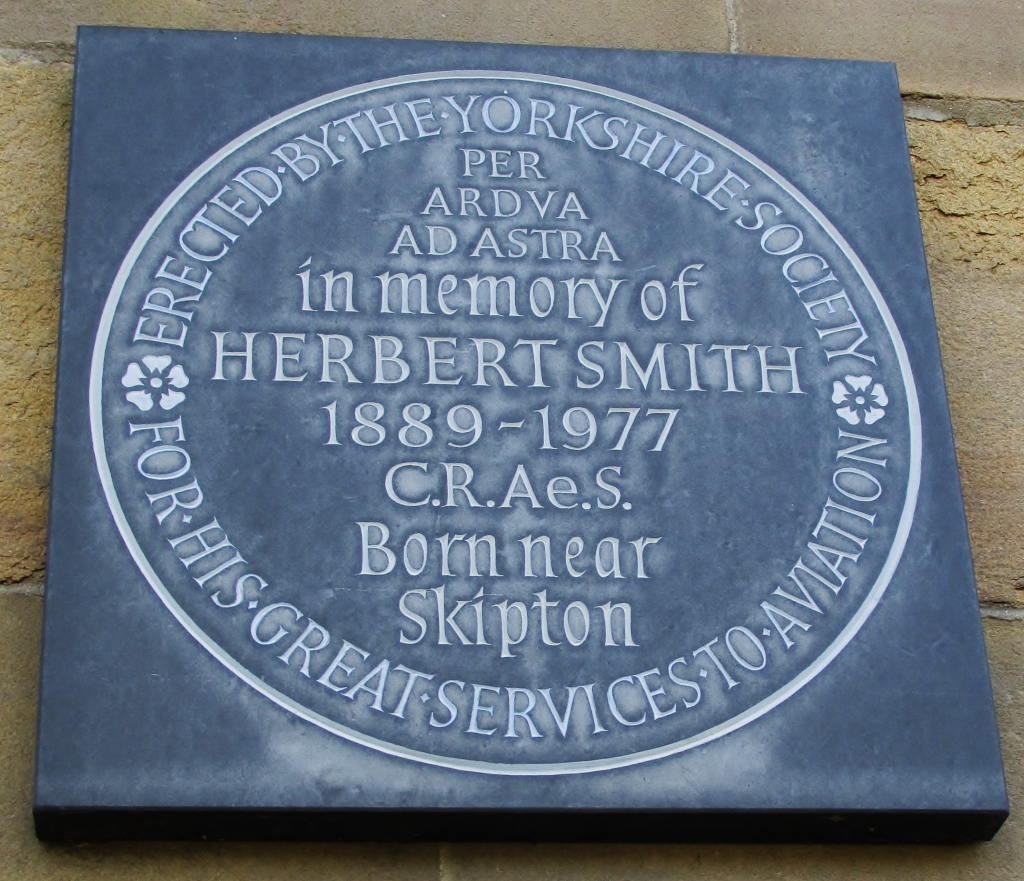
Commemorative plaque displayed at the town hall in Skipton

Herbert Smith CRAeS (1 May 1889 – 1977) was a British aircraft designer.

Smith was born in Bradley, North Yorkshire, England, on 1 May 1889. As a youth, he attended Keighley Boys Grammar School, in West Yorkshire. Smith subsequently attended Bradford Technical College, graduating with a degree in mechanical engineering in 1907.

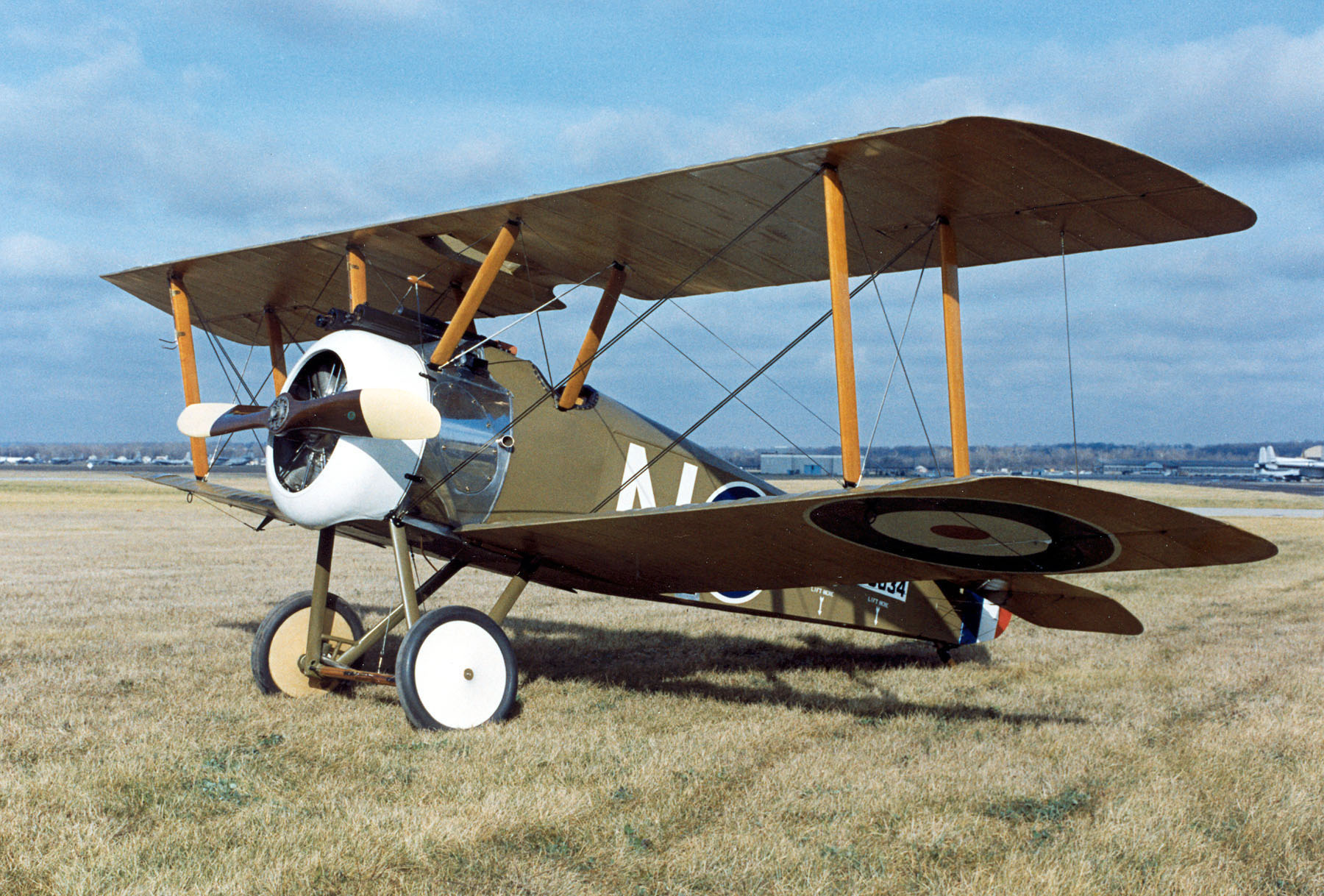
A Sopwith Camel, one of the aircraft designed by Smith

Smith started his career with the Yorkshire machine-tool manufacturers Dean, Smith & Grace, then became a draughtsman with Northampton lift manufacturers Smith, Major and Stephens. In March 1914, Smith joined the Sopwith Aviation Company as a draughtsman. Later that year, he became Sopwith's chief engineer. Smith went on to design the Pup, Triplane, Camel, and Snipe. He worked for the Sopwith firm until it dissolved in October 1920.

In February 1921 the Mitsubishi Internal Combustion Engine Manufacturing Company in Nagoya invited Smith, along with several other former Sopwith engineers to assist Mitsubishi in creating an aircraft manufacturing division. After moving to Japan, they designed the 1MT, B1M, 1MF, and 2MR. Smith returned to England in 1924 and retired from the aviation industry.
