= Irish Baseball Union =

Former governing body for British baseball in Ireland

- Sport: British baseball
- Jurisdiction: Irish Free State
- Abbreviation: IBU
- Founded: 1933
- Headquarters: Dublin
- (Republic of Ireland)

The Irish Baseball Union (known by the abbreviation IBU) was the governing body of the traditional code of British baseball in Ireland, with responsibility for overseeing all aspects of the domestic game and for overseeing the Irish international team, under the codified rules created by the English Baseball Association. The IBU was formed in 1933, and was a short lived organisation, with the Irish international team playing a limited number of games.

== History ==
Building on an introduction of rounders at the Aonach Tailteann in 1924, by April 1933 the new league in Ireland was in full swing and preparations were under way to send an international team to England. The IBU was responsible for the overseeing of the game in Ireland but would "cooperate with the English Baseball Association" and members of the English body were in attendance, at Queens Park, Dublin, for an exhibition game in April 1933. In June 1933 the Irish Baseball Union selected a team to travel to Liverpool for the first ever international between England and Ireland, the team included players from St. Mary's, St. Oswald's, British and Irish, Hibernians, Independent and Connaught ball clubs. England overpowered the Irish team and won by an innings and 42 runs.

== First international roster ==
The below table details the names, baseball clubs and positions of the Irish roster, chosen to play against England, in their first international, in 1933.

Name	Club	Position
P. Murphy		Coach
W. Cahill	St. Mary's BC	Bowler (captain)
T. Farrell	St. Oswald's BC	Bowler
W. Gilmartin	St. Oswald's BC	Backstop
J. Haynes	British and Irish BC	Third Base
P. Stanley	Hibernians BC	Longfield
J. McKane	St. Mary's BC	Backstop
J. Ryan	Hibernians BC	First base
P. Macken	Hibernians BC	Fourth base
P. Cornigan	St. Mary's BC	Longfield
J. P. Heard	Independent BC	Longstop
S. McKane	St. Mary's BC	Longfield
J. Smith	St. Mary's BC	Reserve
H. Lahan	British and Irish BC	Reserve
P. Brogan	Connaught BC	Reserve
J. Duffy	St. Mary's BC	Reserve
