= Whitcoulls =

New Zealand bookshop chain

Whitcoulls 2011 Limited
- Industry: Retail
- Founded: 1971; 55 years ago
- Headquarters: Auckland, New Zealand
- Number of locations: 53 (2026)
- Parent: James Pascoe Group
- Website: whitcoulls.co.nz

Whitcoulls 2011 Limited, or simply Whitcoulls, is a major New Zealand book, stationery, gift, games and toy retail chain. Formerly known as Whitcombe & Tombs, it has 54 stores nationally. Whitcombe & Tombs was founded in 1888, and Coulls Somerville Wilkie in 1871. The companies merged in 1971 to form Whitcoulls.

== Coulls Somerville Wilkie ==
Alternate version of the main logo

Coulls Somerville Wilkie had its origins in Coull Bros, founded in Dunedin in 1872 by brothers Thomas, William, and James Francis Coull. A printing and publishing company, it operated from Crawford Street to the south of the city centre.. Through merger and partnership, its name changed several times before becoming Coulls, Culling & Co. Ltd., a name under which it traded from 1902 until 1922. The Culling in the company's name was Thomas Culling, regarded as the 'father of printing in Otago', whose business work extended to the founding of several newspapers, notably the Otago Witness.

In 1922, Coulls, Culling & Co. merged with J. Wilkie & Co., becoming Coulls Somerville Wilkie, a name under which it operated until 1971. J. Wilkie was founded in the early 1870s by James Wilkie, and bought by William George Somerville in 1894. Originally a stationer and bookseller, J. Wilkie & Co. operated from Princes Street until its amalgamation with Coulls, Culling & Co. in 1921.

== Whitcombe & Tombs ==
Whitcombe & Tombs began in 1882 in Cashel Street in Central Christchurch, as a partnership between a teacher of French who had become a bookseller, George Hawkes Whitcombe and printer George Tombs.

In 1883, the company was among the first registered under the Companies Act 1882. It had market dominance for several decades. George Whitcombe's son, Bertie Ernest Hawkes Whitcombe (1875–1963), was associated with the business for over 70 years.

Thousands of schoolchildren were taught with the aid of Whitcombe's Progressive Primers and later enjoyed Whitcombe's Story Books such as The Adventures of Hoppity Bobtail.

The company, in common with most companies, did not have a completely trouble-free relationship with employees. A court judgment Whitcombe & Tombs Limited v Taylor (1907) 27 NZLR 237 stated the principle that "a well established custom or practice may become part of a contract" (as noted by the Court of Appeal of New Zealand in CA246/03, nearly a century later, despite half a dozen intervening changes of employment law).

== History ==
In 1971, Whitcombe & Tombs merged with Coulls Somerville Wilkie to become Whitcoulls, and has since been sold several times. It now operates as a retail chain only.

In 2001, UK retailer WHSmith purchased the company.

In 2004, Whitcoulls was sold to REDgroup a retail operations company owned by Pacific Equity Partners, a subsidiary of UK-based insurance company Prudential.

On 17 February 2011, RedGroup Retail (including the Borders, Angus & Robertson as well as Whitcoulls chains) were placed into voluntary administration with Ferrier Hodgson appointed as administrators.

On 26 May 2011, it was announced that the company had been sold to Project Mark Ltd, part of the James Pascoe Group owned by the Norman family, who also owned the Farmers department store.

Despite operating in the retail sector, Whitcoulls ran a Christchurch-based publishing programme from 1958 to 2013.

As of 2022, Whitcoulls trades as a major retailer with more than 50 stores across New Zealand offering books, stationery, toys, puzzles, games, gifts, greeting cards and wrap, and magazines.
