= English Baseball Association =

English traditional baseball governing body

- Sport: British baseball
- Jurisdiction: England
- Abbreviation: EBA
- Founded: 1892
- Affiliation: IBB
- Affiliation date: 1927
- Headquarters: Liverpool, England, United Kingdom

Official website
- englishbaseball.weebly.com
- (England)

The English Baseball Association (known by the abbreviation EBA) is the governing body of the traditional code of British baseball in England, with responsibility for overseeing all aspects of the domestic game and the body responsible for the creation and development of the original rules of the game. The EBA was formed in 1892, though this was a continuation of the much older National Rounders Association, who created the first codified rules of British baseball, between 1887 and 1888. The EBA is based in Liverpool and is a member of the International Baseball Board.

== History ==
The National Rounders Association were based in Merseyside, England, where in April 1886 they were one of a number of locally based sporting institutions with elected representation onto the directorate of the Liverpool Athletic Grounds Company Ltd. Calls were made to follow the success of other working class sports such as football, on Merseyside, and rugby in Wales to adopt a distinct set of rules and bureaucracy. The National Rounders Association were one of a number of national organisations supported by the National Physical Recreation society, created in 1886 with Herbert Gladstone as President, "to promote physical recreation amongst the working classes".

The National Rounders Association duly created a new game, drawing on the much older game of rounders but with new rules that they hoped would appeal to adults. With plans to spread this new game across the entire United Kingdom, Gloucester adopted the sport in 1887, with the Gloucester Rounders Association formed in 1888. In a June 1888 edition of the South Wales Daily News, the now codified rules of this new sport were discussed and it was noted that "the National Rounders Association is the authority". It was also noted that the National Physical Recreation society had supplied a copy of the rules of this new game to the author and "the present mode of playing the game is a great improvement on the old style".

=== The first codified rules of British baseball ===
The rules of the new game, created by the National Rounders Association were as follows. "The bases are four, and the runs are made to the right. Eleven is the correct number of players, as at cricket, the bowler, man behind batsmen, longstop, one at each of the bases and cover bases. A regulation bat, not to exceed 30 inches in length or 3 1/2 inches in breadth, is used instead of the 'timmy'. Runs are scored individually to the striker, and collectively to the side; a run for each base that the striker succeeds in reaching without stopping. The ball must be delivered over the striking base above the knee and below the head to be a 'good ball'; two bad balls count one point to the opposite side.

=== Adopting the moniker of baseball ===
In 1892, in "finding there was so much prejudice against the name" the National Rounders Association and the South Wales Rounders Association dropped 'rounders' and replaced this with 'baseball'. This resulted in the governing body, the National Rounders Association, being known as the English Baseball Association and the South Wales Rounders Association becoming the South Wales Baseball Association. In May 1892, it was reported that the Gloucestershire Rounders Association had become the Gloucester English Baseball Association, with leagues already under way.

=== Development of the rules ===
In April 1899, at the annual meeting of the English Baseball Association in Liverpool, it was resolved that the rules of the game would be changed, to speed up play and tackle the "waiting tactics adopted by batsmen". The change would see batters face two "good balls" instead of three, and that on the third "good ball" the batter would get an "extra" ball.

By September 1922 the need for better officiating of games was recognised and the Umpire's Association was formed. In September 1925 it was reported in the Liverpool Echo that a "revolutionary change in bowling" was being mulled over by the English Baseball Association. The new proposed rule would be "that when the bowler has sent up the third bad ball before he has sent up the second good ball, the batter shall be allowed to go to the first base, and the batting side shall have a bye recorded in their favour. If the first base, at the time, is occupied by another batter, that batter should go to second base. If two or three bases are occupied by batters at the time, each batter shall proceed to his next base, the batter at third base reaching home; but no batter at second or third base shall go to his next base except to make way for the batter occupying the next previous base."

Finally, in May 1929, the rules of British baseball were copyrighted by the English Baseball Association.

== Relationship with the Welsh Baseball Union ==
The international match between England and Wales in 2006

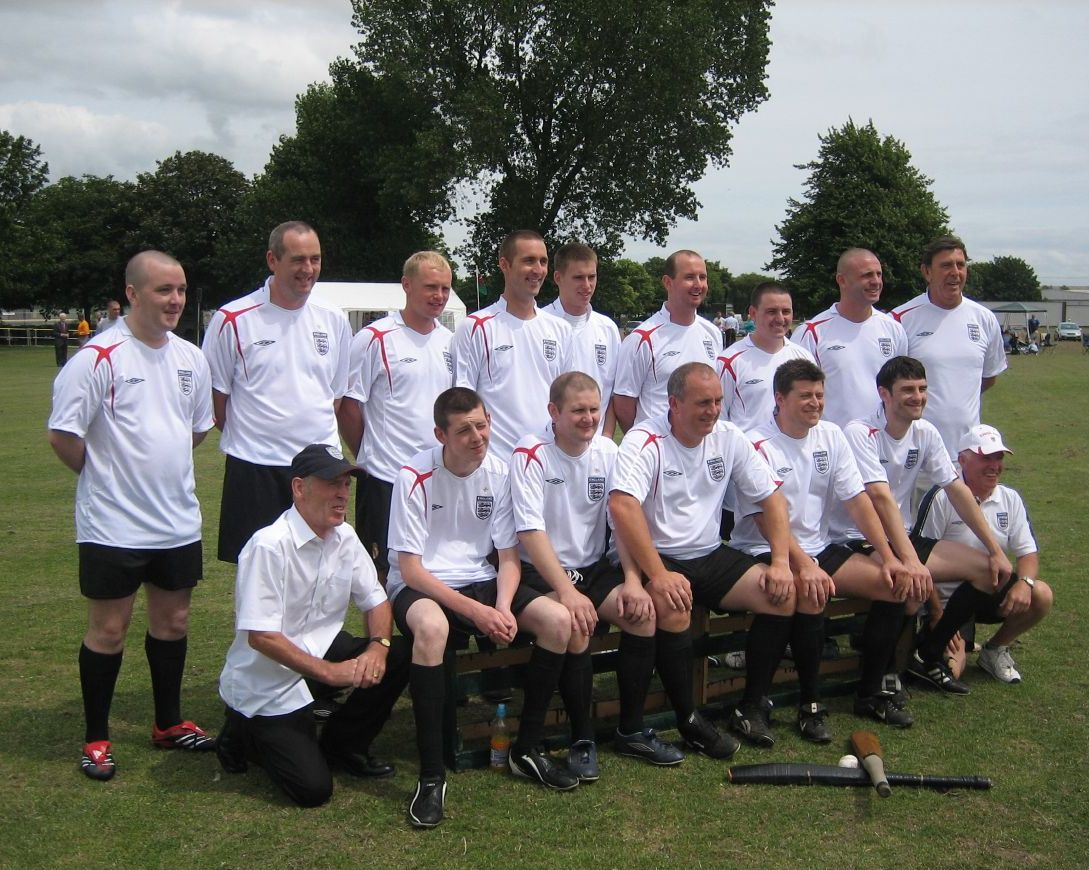
The English (EBA) team

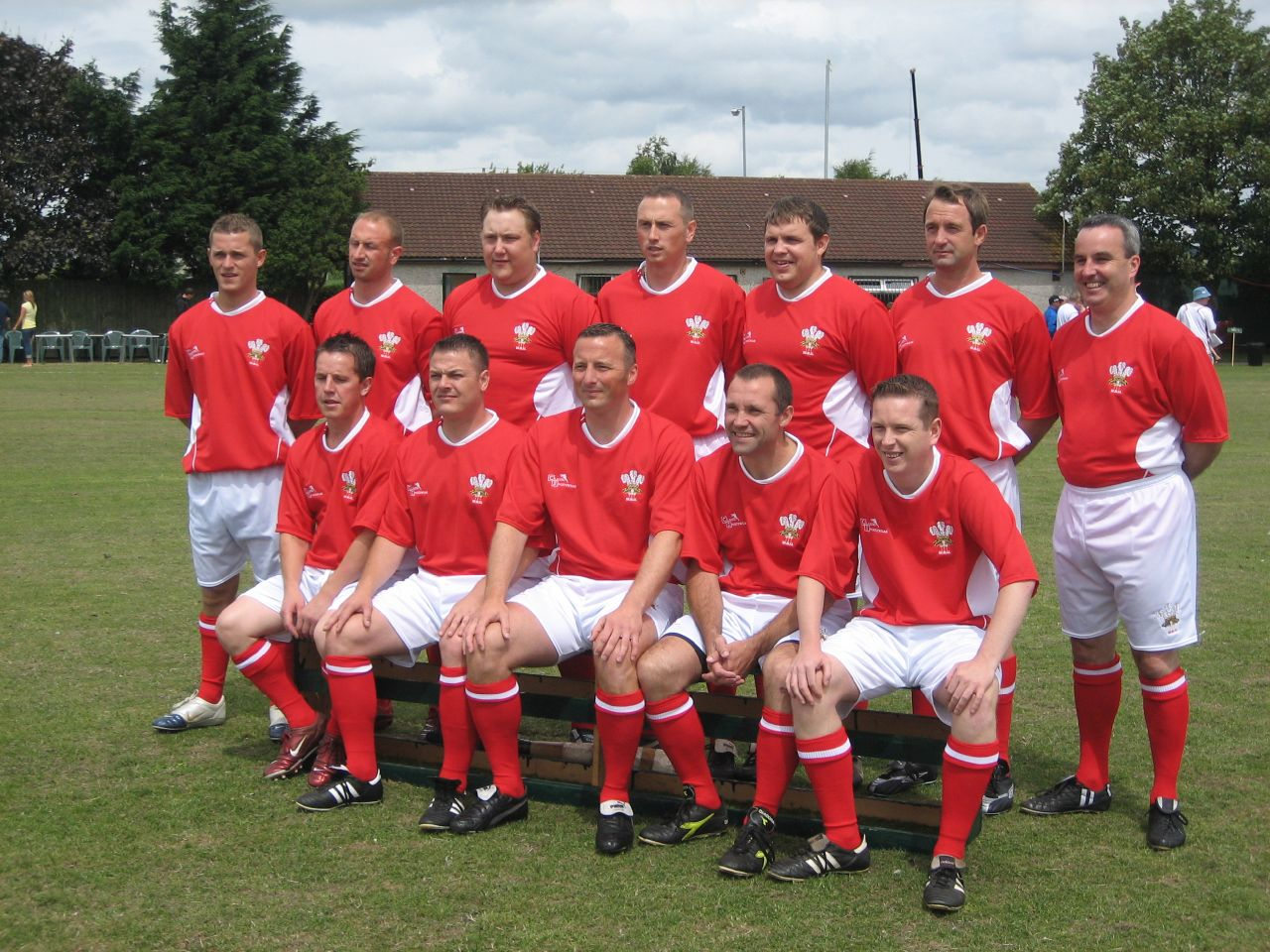
The Welsh (WBU) team

In a June 1888 edition of the South Wales Daily News, the now codified rules of British baseball were discussed and it was noted that "the National Rounders Association is the authority", making clear that the South Wales Baseball Association organised its own domestic leagues and competitions but under the rules created by the English Baseball Association. It was also evidenced that the National Physical Recreation society had supplied a copy of the rules of this new game and that "the present mode of playing the game is a great improvement on the old style". At their annual meeting, in 1893, the South Wales Baseball Association "decided to continue to play under English rules". In March 1922 the first annual meeting of the newly formed Welsh Baseball Union was held at Grange YMCA, succeeding the South Wales Baseball Association. The new body quickly made a visit to Liverpool and noted that "the closer link formed between the English and Welsh baseball authorities would materially help to attain the standard of a national pastime". The Athletic News reported, in June 1927, that a British Cup was being considered, between the finalists of the English Baseball Association and Welsh Baseball Union championships.

=== England versus Wales internationals ===
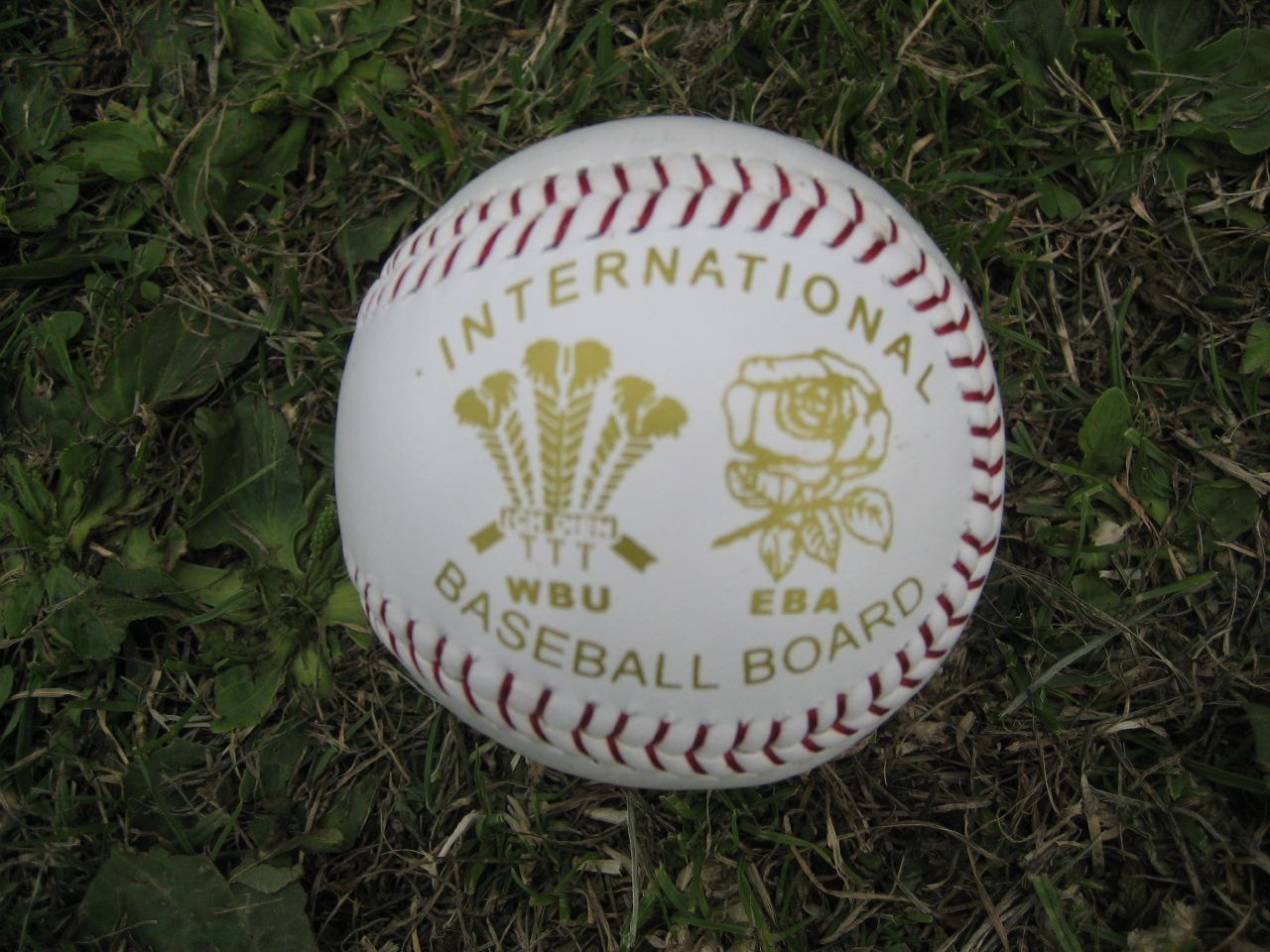
Baseball used in an international match between Wales and England in 2006

The first international match between England and Wales was held on 3 August 1908 at the Harlequins Ground in Roath, Cardiff (St Peter's RFC). Wales won the match 122–118 with batsmen and captain Lew Lewis hitting a number of balls 'over the house tops'. The next international was held in 1914 at Goodison Park, Liverpool. The English won the match in front of 4,000 spectators, but annual internationals would not start until after the war. The first women's international match between England and Wales took place in 1926.

== Relationship with the International Baseball Board ==
In July 1921 there were efforts for the establishment of a National Baseball Council, where members of the English Baseball Association and South Wales Baseball Association met to discuss the formation of the new governing body. The growth of the international fixture had brought increased scrutiny on the game's arbitration and rules, as such the English Baseball Association and the Welsh Baseball Union formed the International Baseball Board to oversee international fixtures, in 1927.

=== Other international fixtures ===
In August 1918 the English Baseball Association organised an international fixture, whereby England took on Canada at the Police Athletic Ground in the Fairfield area of Liverpool. This game was advertised to have been 'American baseball'. In June 1933 the Irish Baseball Union sent a team to Liverpool for the first ever international between England and Ireland, at Pirrie Park. The team included players from St. Mary's, St. Oswald's, British and Irish, Hibernians, Independent and Connaught ball clubs. England won by an innings and 42 runs.

In October 1934 the English Baseball Association signed an agreement to travel to Edinburgh in 1935, to begin the process of introducing the game into Scotland, though a number of well known Scottish players such as Billy Lamont, Charlie Moore and Donald MacKinlay were already playing in leagues in Liverpool. In the first game, the Scottish defeated the English at Edinburgh by 24 runs to 3, with over 5,000 in attendance. The return game at Bootle attracted a crowd of over 3,000 spectators, to see Scotland triumph again, 4 runs to 0. These two games were played to the American code.

== Principle people ==
The table below represents the currently known chronological order of elected principle people within the English Baseball Association.

Office-holders
Office	Name!
President	Robert Gladstone
President	A.G. Clayton
President	Jack O'Neill
President	Tom O'Neill
President	Arthur Wright
President	Johnny Jervis
Chairperson
Chairperson	A.J. Bailey
Chairperson	Mr Kennard
Chairperson	A.J. Bailey
Chairperson	C.C. Ferguson
Chairperson	Jack O'Neill
Chairperson	John Murray
Chairperson	Fred Burrowes
Chairperson	R. Maddox
Chairperson	Norman Maddox
Chairperson	Arthur Wright
Chairperson	James Jervis
