= Peter Harrison (rugby union) =

English rugby union footballer

Peter Harrison was an English rugby union footballer who played in the 1950s, 1960s and 1970s who played rugby union (RU) for Bradford RFC, as a prop. (Note: Not to be confused with the rugby league footballer of the 1960s and 1970s for Featherstone Rovers and Wakefield Trinity.)

== Early life ==
Peter Harrison was born at Coal House Nursing Home in Odsal, Bradford on 27 July 1935 – 12 May 2011. Peter attended Horton Bank Primary School and after passing his 11-plus went to Grange Boys Grammar School. He gained the Queen's Scout Award.

In 1958 after leaving school at 16 he took a job in the Wool Trade as a Yarn salesman with James H Woods, before being called up for National Service. He went on to be a member of the Bradford Junior Chamber of Commerce and in later life set up his own fuel companies Holmfield and Brent Petroleum. During his early life he became great friends and wrestling partner with Tony Orford the son of the wrestling legend Sandy Orford.

== National Service ==
Harrison was called up for Military Service, and joined the Royal Artillery where he did his two-year service. Here he represented The Royal Artillery Rugby club, 'The Gunner's', as did fellow Bradford RFC teammate Brian Whitcombe.

== Rugby career Bradford RFC ==
Peter joined Bradford RFC one of the leading sides in the country at the time, initially as a back row forward. Through sheer hard work he learned to play tight head prop, and went on to establish himself in the team as part of a legendary front row of Frank Whitcombe Jr (329 appearances), Peter Crowther (414) and Peter Harrison (184). The trio played together for twelve years.

Their most memorable triumph was winning the Yorkshire Cup final against Harrogate at Cross Green, Otley in 1966 under the captaincy of Mike Dixon.

== Baildon Mini Rugby Club ==
In 1975 Peter teamed up with Fred Anderson who had played rugby for Leeds Rugby League in the sixties, and they started the Under 6's at Baildon Rugby Club, coaching the same team for over six years as the lads grew older. Many of the lads who first played together in 1975 as kids would play together at senior level for many years.

== First Overseas Rugby Tour to Zimbabwe by Woodhouse Grove ==
Peter was passionate about giving his son, and the school his son attended the fun he had had in rugby. With his pal Tim Adams they set about raising £35,000 to send the school on its first tour in 1987 to Zimbabwe. The pinnacle of the fund raising was a Sportmen's Dinner where Max Boyce and a galaxy of English and Welsh International rugby players attended from both codes. After the success of Zimbabwe, Woodhouse Grove School has toured many rugby playing countries around the world.

== Fundraiser at Bradford and Bingley RFC ==
After retiring from playing rugby at Bradford RFC, Harrison joined the newly formed Bradford and Bingley RFC. As Head of Marketing and Fundraising, he secured sponsorships, including JCT600, and raised funds for the club. Later, he became involved with Volunteering Bradford.

== Fundraiser for Volunteering Bradford ==
Harrison supported Volunteering Bradford, as the charity opened opportunities for the community to work in all types of industries, thus allowing volunteers to make a difference.
