= Dean, Smith & Grace =

British manufacturer of lathes and milling machines

- Industry: Engineering
- Founded: 1865
- Founder: Joseph Dean
- Headquarters: Keighley, West Yorkshire, England
- Area served: Global
- Key people: Joseph Dean, James Smith, Harry Smith
- Products: Machine Tools
- Website: www.dsgmachines.com

Dean, Smith & Grace is a British manufacturer of lathes and milling machines, based in Keighley, West Yorkshire. Their products have been described as "the Rolls-Royce of lathes".

== History ==
The company was founded in 1865 by Joseph Dean (born c1825 in Barnoldswick, then in the West Riding of Yorkshire), in Bingley, West Yorkshire, known as "Old Dean", who retired in the late 1800s and died in Ilkley, West Yorkshire, in 1909.

In the late 1860s Dean Smith & Grace moved to Keighley, and exported machine tools across the Empire. Following Joseph Dean's retirement, the company traded as Smith & Grace of Thrapston, The Smith and Grace of Thrapston were different individuals sharing the same surname. The assumed connection between the two companies is probably false. but in 1908 a private company was reformed as "Dean Smith & Grace 1908 Ltd".

By the early 20th century, Dean Smith & Grace had grown to be one of the leading heavy tool firms in Yorkshire. In response to the introduction of high speed steel around 1900, the company ceased building to customers' individual specifications and concentrated on a new type of steel geared lathe built for strength and rigidity.

Herbert Smith, the aircraft designer who was responsible for designs such as the Sopwith Triplane, Camel, and Snipe worked for the firm in the years before the First World War.

The company continued as an independent manufacturer until 1973 when bought out by the Monarch Machine Tool Company of Sidney, Ohio, USA. By this time the company was noted for equipping the engineering research laboratories and workshops at UMIST in Manchester. The same laboratory continues to use the same machines into the 21st century, citing them in their research publications. When Monarch went into bankruptcy the company was bought by Newsmith Stainless Limited of Roberttown, West Yorkshire, and now trades as Dean Smith & Grace Lathes UK Limited.

In 2012 the company was acquired by the MTTG group.

In April 2015, it was announced that Dean, Smith and Grace was to be moved to Halifax by MTTG.

In 2025, Dean Smith & Grace Limited, is located at Unit 4, Shay Lane Works, Shay Lane, Halifax, Yorkshire, England.
