= James Whitcombe =

English rugby union player

- Born: James William Whitcombe; 20 November 2000 (age 25) Keighley, England
- Height: 6 ft 2 in (1.88 m)
- Weight: 18 st 12 lb (120 kg)
- School: Woodhouse Grove School
- Notable relative: Martin Whitcombe (father)

Rugby union career
- Position: Prop
- Current team: Edinburgh
Senior career
Years	Team	Apps	(Points)
2019–2025	Leicester Tigers	68	(10)
2019	→ Sydney University	0	(0)
2019–2020	→ Leicester Lions	10	(10)
2025–	Edinburgh	2	(0)
- Correct as of 15 June 2025
International career
Years	Team	Apps	(Points)
2019–2020	England U20	3	(0)
- Correct as of 21 March 2021

James William Whitcombe (born 20 November 2000) is an English rugby union player for Edinburgh in the United Rugby Championship, his preferred position is loosehead prop. Between 2019 and 2025 he played 68 times for Leicester Tigers in Premiership Rugby.

== Early life ==
Whitcombe first played rugby union at 5 years old for Skipton RFC, in north Yorkshire, and also played rugby league for Keighley Albion, before concentrating on union at Bradford & Bingley RFC and Woodhouse Grove School where he was selected for England's under-16, England under-18 on their 2018 summer tour of South Africa and England under-19 sides. He joined Leicester Tigers academy's development pathway at the age of 13. He was part of Leicester Tigers two successive under 18 league titles. After finishing school he spent 3 months playing for Sydney University Colts in the Shute Shield.

== Career ==
In July 2019 Whitcombe was promoted to Leicester's development squad and became a full time rugby player. He spent the 2019–2020 season on loan with Leicester Lions in National League 2 South, and was named the league's Young player of the season. He signed new contracts with Leicester in May 2020, and March 2021.

Whitcombe made his senior Leicester Tigers debut on 19 December 2020 in a European Rugby Challenge Cup win against Bayonne, and made his Premiership Rugby debut as a replacement in a loss against Bristol Bears at Ashton Gate on 27 February 2021.

His first start for Leicester came in the unusual position of blindside flanker, becoming the first Leicester prop to play outside the front row since 1967.

== Family life ==
Whitcombe is the son of Martin Whitcombe, the grandson to Frank Whitcombe Jr and the great grandson to Frank Whitcombe and Thomas Cockcroft, both prominent rugby league players in the 1940s.
