= Whitcomb, West Virginia =

- Ghost town
- Location within West Virginia
- Coordinates: 37°46′37″N 80°25′41″W
- Country: United States
- State: West Virginia
- County: Greenbrier
- Elevation: 1,706 ft (520 m)
- GNIS feature ID

Whitcomb is a ghost town in Greenbrier County, West Virginia, United States. Whitcomb was located on the Greenbrier River 1.5 miles (2.4 km) east of Fairlea. Whitcomb appeared on USGS maps as late as 1935.
