= International Baseball Board =

Governing body of British-coded baseball

- Sport: British baseball
- Jurisdiction: United Kingdom
- Abbreviation: IBB
- Founded: 1927
- Headquarters: United Kingdom
- (United Kingdom)

The International Baseball Board was founded in 1927 and is the international governing body for traditional British baseball codes. It was founded in 1927 to oversee international fixtures, primarily between England and Wales, which are played at A and B level for men, and at age-group level for boys and historically women's international fixtures. It is not to be confused with the International Baseball Federation, which is the world governing body for the American code of baseball.

== History ==
The first international match between England and Wales was held in 1908, the first women's international match between England and Wales took place in 1926. In 1918 England took on Canada. In July 1921 there were efforts for the establishment of a National Baseball Council, where members of the English Baseball Association and South Wales Baseball Association met to discuss the formation of the new governing body. The IBB was finally established in 1927. One of the first acts of the IBB was to rule on the legality of a player being capped by two different nations. Jim Sullivan was born in Wales and played both rugby league and rugby union. Having turned professional with Wigan, Jim was selected for England's British baseball team in 1928. The IBB ruled that this cap was illegal, as Jim had already been capped by Wales in 1921. Amazingly Sullivan crossed to the American code of baseball in the mid 1930's, for Manchester Blue Sox and Greenfield Giants.

By 1960 the IBB was the leading body with responsibility for any changes to the rules first developed by the EBA, and in 1960 schools in England, who had still continued to use smaller bowling box dimensions and other peculiarities, adopted IBB regulations. In 1989 the IBB faced a crisis, when reserves of the long used worsted Webber ball were exhausted, following the manufacturer, John Jaques of London, ceasing production.

== Structure ==
IBB has two member organisations, the English Baseball Association and the Welsh Baseball Union. The EBA historically had responsibility for overseeing all aspects of the domestic game and was the body responsible for the creation and development of the original rules of the game. The EBA was formed in 1892, though this was a continuation of the much older National Rounders Association, who created the first codified rules of British baseball, between 1887 and 1888. In 1888 and again in 1893 the South Wales Baseball Association affirmed that the EBA was the "authority" on the rules of the game and that they would continue to play to those rules. In March 1922 the first annual meeting of the newly formed Welsh Baseball Union was held at Grange YMCA, succeeding the South Wales Baseball Association. The new body quickly made a visit to Liverpool and noted that “the closer link formed between the English and Welsh baseball authorities would materially help to attain the standard of a national pastime”. In 1922 the Welsh Ladies Baseball League was formed under the WBU and by 1994 had 600 players across 40 clubs.

The international match between England and Wales in 2006

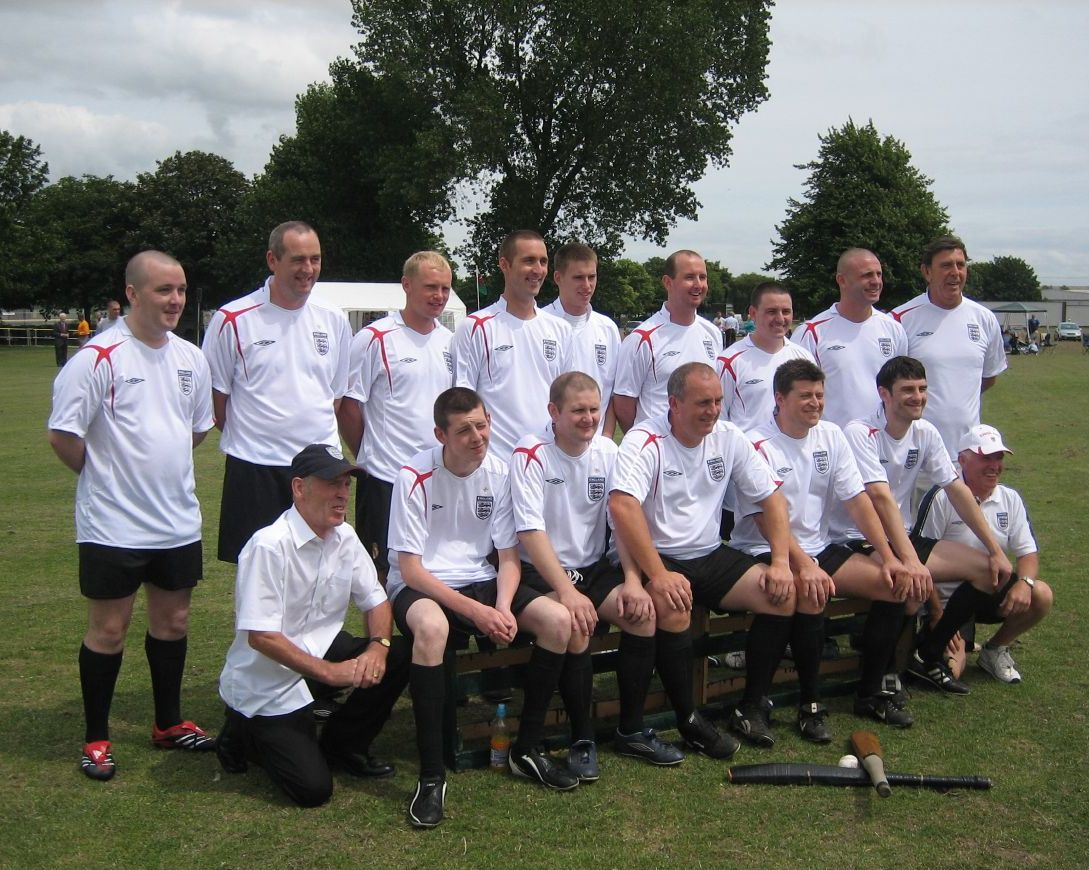
The English (EBA) team

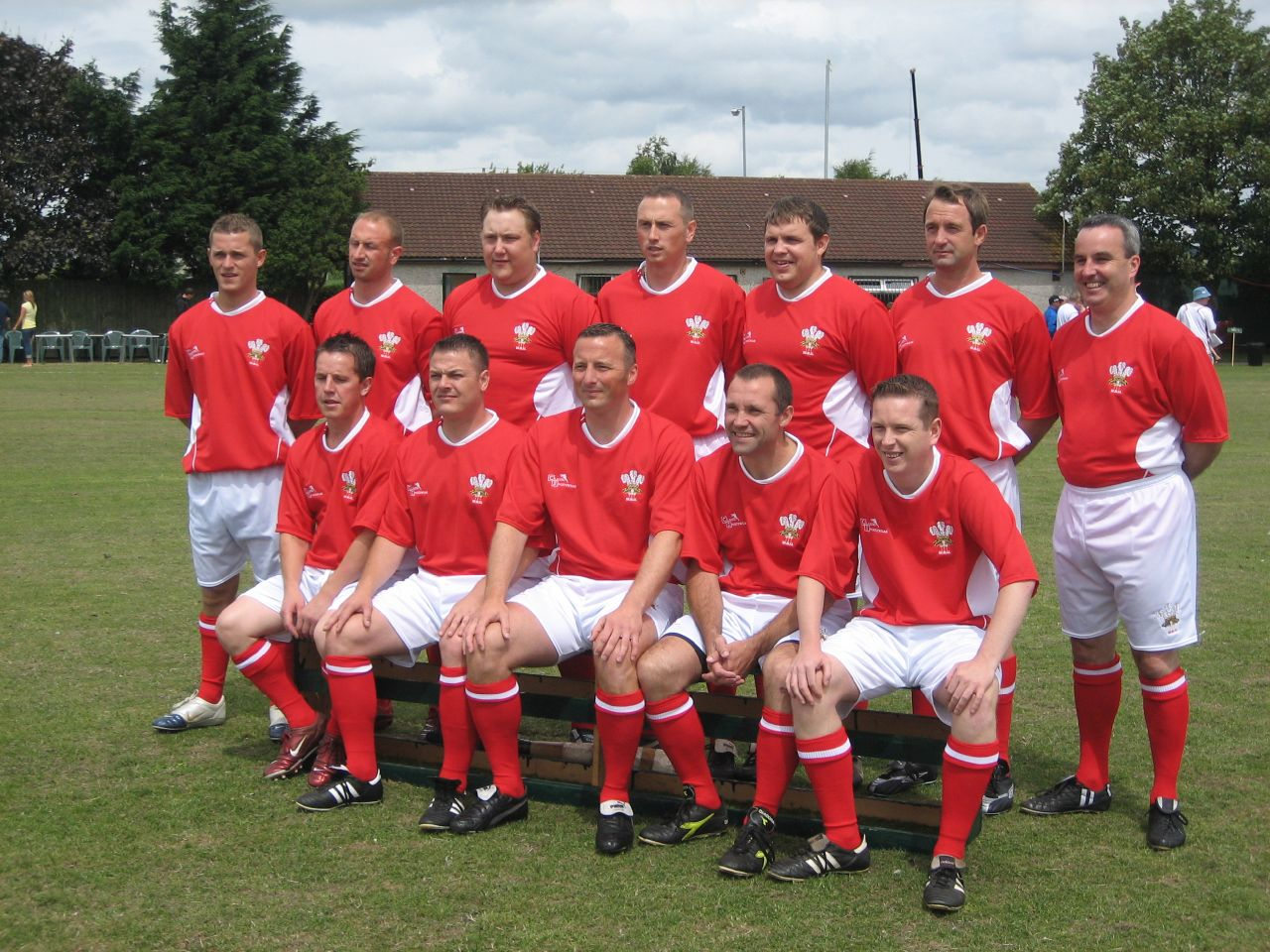
The Welsh (WBU) team
