= Brian Whitcombe =

Welsh rugby union footballer (1934–2021)

Brian Whitcombe (13 October 1934 – 2 January 2021) was a Rugby Union footballer for Bradford RFC in the 1950s and 1960s, playing at Flanker i.e. 6 or 7.

== Early life ==
Born at 15 Sussex Street Grangetown, Cardiff, Brian Whitcombe and his brother Frank Whitcombe Jr were part of a famous rugby playing family. Brian moved north aged one when his father Frank Whitcombe, a rugby player with the Army Rugby Union team, turned professional for Broughton Rangers Rugby league team in September 1935. Here the family settled in Withington a suburb of Manchester. In Withington Brian's younger brother Frank was born on 21 July 1936. Later in December 1938 the family moved across the Pennines when Frank Whitcombe Senior was signed by Bradford Northern for a world record fee. After moving to Bradford the family lived at 109 Wibsey Park Avenue close to the Odsal Stadium home of Bradford Northern.

Brian attended Buttershaw St. Pauls Primary School and later Wibsey secondary modern school. At age 14 he began his rugby career in 1949 with Sedbergh Boys' Club playing junior Rugby league. The club was based near to his home in Wibsey near to Bradford, before switching to play Rugby Union at Bradford RFC.

His first job was as a Machine tool fitter at Dean, Smith & Grace and later a three-year printers apprenticeship at Briggs Brothers Silsden.

== National Service rugby ==
Whitcombe was called up for National Service in January 1953. Brian served in the Royal Artillery for two years, posted to Bulford Barracks in Wiltshire. During his service he represented 45 Field Regiment and The Royal Artillery Rugby club, 'The Gunners', as did fellow Bradford RFC team mate Peter Harrison.

== Rugby career Bradford RFC ==
Bradford Rugby Football Club was one of the leading club sides in the country at the time. Brian Whitcombe joined Bradford in 1952 making 174 appearances and his brother Frank Whitcombe 329 appearances. Brian put in a man of the match performance in Bradford's 9–3 victory at Lidget Grean over Leicester Tigers in 1962, scoring the only try of the game. During the late 1950s and early 1960s Brian Whitcombe was a regular trialist for the Yorkshire county side.

When his first class rugby career was over Brian joined Keighley RUFC and played out his career with his brother Frank.

== Life after rugby ==
Following retirement Brian became a Lay preacher on the Airedale Methodist Church circuit. He died on 2 January 2021.
