= Bertie Ernest Hawkes Whitcombe =

Bertie Ernest Hawkes Whitcombe (1875–1963) was a notable New Zealand printer, bookseller and publisher. He was born in Christchurch, North Canterbury, New Zealand in 1875.
