= British baseball =

Bat-and-ball game originating in Britain

British baseball, also known colloquially in Wales as Welsh baseball, is a bat-and-ball game played in Wales, England, and to a lesser extent in Ireland and Scotland. The game emerged as a distinct sport in Merseyside, Gloucester and South Wales at the end of the 19th century, drawing on the much older game of rounders. Teams in all locations played under the codified rules created by the National Rounders Association (later renamed as the (English Baseball Association), with the game in Wales locally organised first by the South Wales Baseball Association, (still playing under English Baseball Association rules), who in turn were replaced by the Welsh Baseball Union. The Irish Baseball Union were formed in 1933. Both the English Baseball Association and Welsh Baseball Union are members of the International Baseball Board.

== History ==
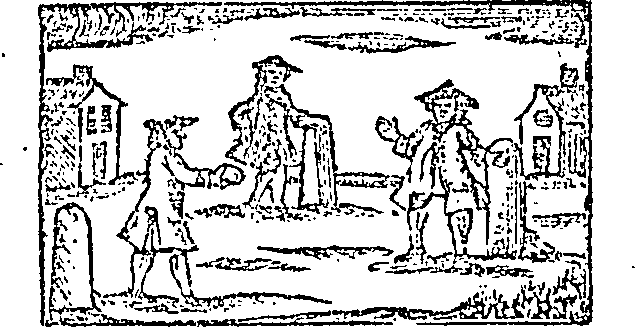
The depiction from A Little Pretty Pocket-Book, which may have involved hitting with the hand

In the tradition of bat-and-ball games, British baseball has roots going back centuries, and there are references to "baseball" from the beginning of the eighteenth century, and "rounders" from 1828. Bat-and-ball games in Britain have a long history and a ball and bat game possibly ancestral to rounders and British baseball was attested as early as 1344. A game called "baseball" was attested in 1700 when a vicar in Maidstone decried its playing on a Sunday, and referenced in 1744 in the children's book A Little Pretty Pocket-Book where it was called Base-Ball. Jane Austen also included a passing reference to the game in Northanger Abbey.

David Block and John Thorn, the official historian for Major League Baseball, speculate that this version of baseball may have involved batters hitting with their hand rather than with a bat, akin to modern-day punchball.

=== Establishment of codified rules ===
The National Rounders Association were based in Merseyside, England, where in April 1886 they were one of a number of locally based sporting institutions with elected representation onto the directorate of the Liverpool Athletic Grounds Company Ltd. Calls were made to follow the success of other working class sports such as football, on Merseyside, and rugby in Wales to adopt a distinct set of rules and bureaucracy. The National Rounders Association were one of a number of national organisations supported by the National Physical Recreation society, created in 1886 with Herbert Gladstone as president, "to promote physical recreation amongst the working classes".

The National Rounders Association duly created a new game, drawing on the much older game of rounders but with new rules that they hoped would appeal to adults. With plans to spread this new game across the entire United Kingdom, Gloucester adopted the sport in 1887, with the Gloucester Rounders Association formed in 1888. In a June 1888 edition of the South Wales Daily News, the now codified rules of this new sport were discussed and it was noted that "the National Rounders Association is the authority". It was also noted that the National Physical Recreation society had supplied a copy of the rules of this new game to the author and "the present mode of playing the game is a great improvement on the old style". In South Wales the game fully took hold in 1889, four clubs were created in South Wales who in 1890 then formed the South Wales Rounders Association. The rules of the new game, created by the National Rounders Association were as follows. "The bases are four, and the runs are made to the right. Eleven is the correct number of players, as at cricket, the bowler, man behind batsmen, longstop, one at each of the bases and cover bases. A regulation bat, not to exceed 30 inches in length or 3 1/2 inches in breadth, is used instead of the 'timmy'. Runs are scored individually to the striker, and collectively to the side; a run for each base that the striker succeeds in reaching without stopping. The ball must be delivered over the striking base above the knee and below the head to be a 'good ball'; two bad balls count one point to the opposite side.

The threat of the American code of baseball in Britain reached a peak between 1889 and 1890, when a national league for that code was formed, the first fully professional baseball league in Britain. The National League of Baseball of Great Britain was created at a meeting at the Criterion, London, alongside the establishment a new baseball association, the new association quickly moved to establish a headquarters at 38 Holborn Viaduct, London. Curiously the National Rounders Association were represented at the meeting. This was the third attempt by American backers to establish their influence over bat and ball games in Britain, in the 1870s, baseball teams from the United States, including the Boston Red Stockings and Philadelphia Athletics, toured the United Kingdom but with limited success. In 1889 the wealthy Albert Goodwill Spalding used his position as a former star player of the American code, and as a leading sporting goods supplier, to arrange another tour of the United Kingdom by American baseball stars including the Chicago White Stockings.

In 1892, in “finding there was so much prejudice against the name” the National Rounders Association and the South Wales Rounders Association dropped ‘rounders’ and replaced this with ‘baseball’. This resulted in the governing body, the National Rounders Association, being known as the English Baseball Association and the South Wales Rounders Association becoming the South Wales Baseball Association, who at their annual meeting in Newport, in 1893, "decided to continue to play under English rules". By the end of the 1892 season, baseball teams from Liverpool and Lancashire were invited to play matches at Cardiff Arms Park with the express purpose of popularising "the improved version of the old-fashioned game of rounders". In May 1892, it was reported that the Gloucestershire Rounders Association had become the Gloucester English Baseball Association, with leagues already under way. By June 1892 baseball in Gloucestershire was in full swing, but ultimately this was a short lived enterprise.

In June 1892 Newton Crane, the president of the National Baseball Association (the body responsible for the overseeing of the American rules of baseball in Great Britain) wrote an open letter in the Liverpool Mercury, stating that Derby Baseball Club had accepted the challenge of the chief executive officer of the National Rounders Association (by now renamed as the English Baseball Association), that a team of the best British baseball players in the country could defeat a team of the best ‘American rules’ baseball players in Britain. The matches would “be played according to the genuine or regular baseball rules”, with a match each in Liverpool and Derby. By 1894 the Liverpool and District Baseball League was established and the game was flourishing on Merseyside and parts of Lancashire and South Wales. In April 1899, at the annual meeting of the English Baseball Association in Liverpool, it was resolved that the rules of the game would be changed, to speed up play and tackle the “waiting tactics adopted by batsmen”. The change would see batters face two “good balls” instead of three, and that on the third “good ball” the batter would get an “extra” ball.

=== First internationals and first women's games ===
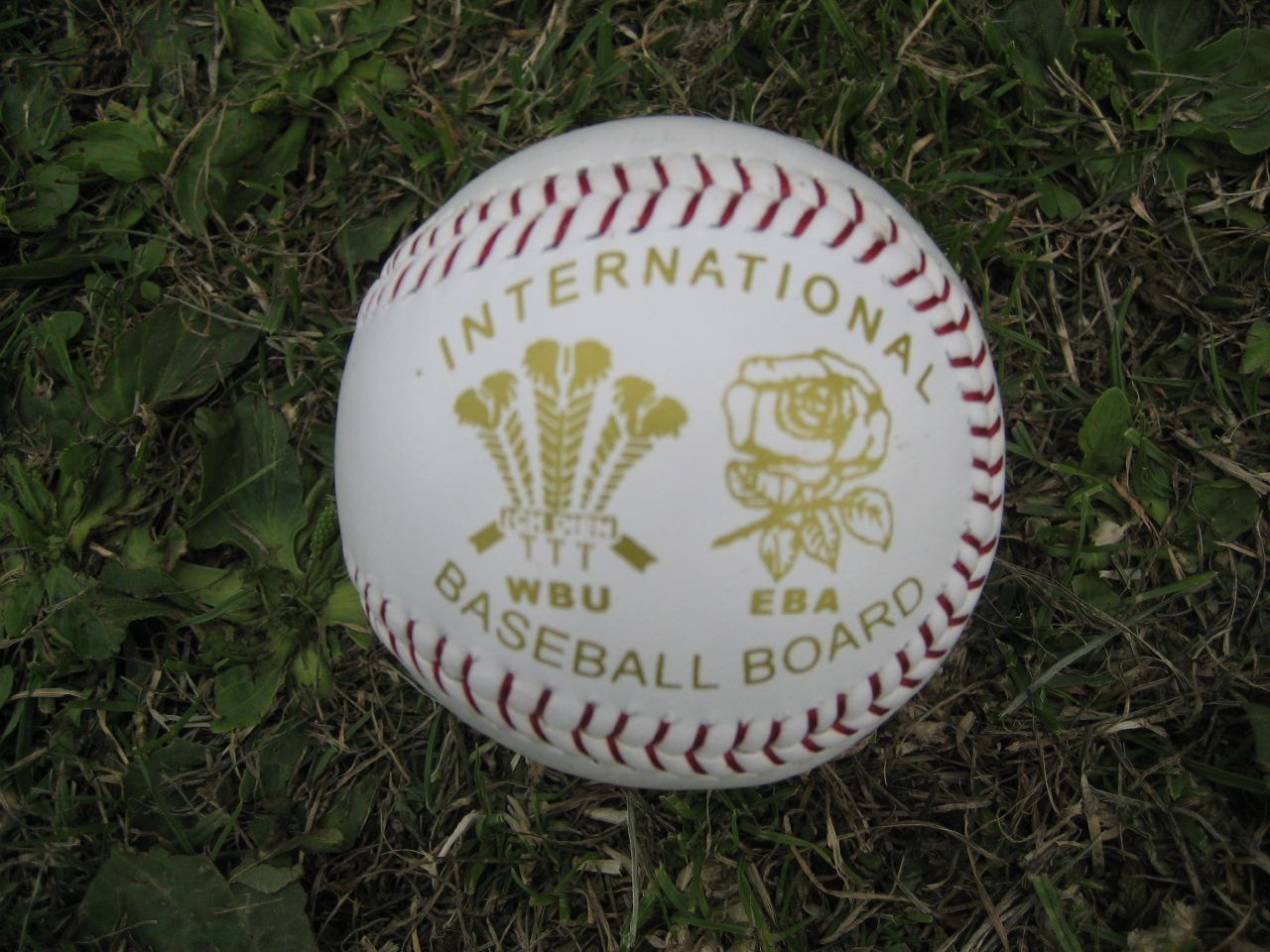
Baseball used in an international match between Wales and England in 2006

In 1905 the South Wales Baseball Association had just fifteen member clubs, by 1921 the game had become ubiquitous in its heartland cities, with the newly renamed Welsh Baseball Union comprising sixty clubs, all within the Cardiff and Newport areas. As the number of amateur clubs expanded in Cardiff, Newport and Merseyside a Wales-England fixture was proposed to promote the sport further. The inaugural international match was held on 3 August 1908 at the Harlequins Ground in Roath, Cardiff (St Peter's RFC). Wales won the match 122–118 with batsmen and captain Lew Lewis hitting a number of balls 'over the house tops'.

The game in Cardiff had already become a popular summer pursuit among the city's rugby players and the match saw three Cardiff RFC players take the field, including Viv Huzzey, who also represented Wales in rugby union and rugby league. The next international was held in 1914 at Goodison Park, Liverpool. The English won the match in front of 4,000 spectators, but annual internationals would not start until after the war. During World War I the English Baseball Association were keen on keeping baseball ticking over in the Liverpool region, despite a lack of experienced players. In February 1916 the annual meeting was held, with the primary topic of discussion being efforts to utilise munitions workers and others to supplement existing teams, and the English Baseball Association organised games to raise funds for the war effort.

Ticket for a match "In Welsh and American style" at Cardiff Arms Park

In August 1918 the English Baseball Association organised an international fixture, whereby England took on Canada at the Police Athletic Ground in the Fairfield area of Liverpool. This game was advertised to have been ‘American baseball’. The game continued to gain popularity during the interwar period and was an "integral part of local culture" in Cardiff and Newport. Schoolboy leagues were established, and Cardiff saw the first schoolgirls league. In July 1921 there were efforts for the establishment of a National Baseball Council, where members of the English Baseball Association and South Wales Baseball Association met to discuss the formation of the new governing body. In March 1922 the first annual meeting of the newly formed Welsh Baseball Union was held at Grange YMCA, succeeding the South Wales Baseball Association. The new body quickly made a visit to Liverpool and noted that “the closer link formed between the English and Welsh baseball authorities would materially help to attain the standard of a national pastime”. Welsh baseball was by now notable for its female participation, which had begun during the First World War among the young women working in factories. A women's league was set up in Cardiff in 1922 and in 1926 the first women's international match took place between Wales and England.

By September 1922 the need for better officiating of games was recognised and the Umpire’s Association was formed. In an effort to spread the native baseball rules exhibition games were organised by the English Baseball Association, in London, in 1924. Liverpool and Scotland international Donald McKinlay was one of the baseball players on show. The crowd at the 1924 Cardiff Arms Park men's international reached 10,000 spectators for the first time and the 1925 fixture at the Police Athletic Ground, Liverpool, saw a crowd of 12,000. In September 1925 it was reported in the Liverpool Echo that a “revolutionary change in bowling” was being mulled over by the English Baseball Association. The new proposed rule would be “that when the bowler has sent up the third bad ball before he has sent up the second good ball, the batter shall be allowed to go to the first base, and the batting side shall have a bye recorded in their favour. If the first base, at the time, is occupied by another batter, that batter should go to second base. If two or three bases are occupied by batters at the time, each batter shall proceed to his next base, the batter at third base reaching home; but no batter at second or third base shall go to his next base except to make way for the batter occupying the next previous base.”

The Athletic News reported, in June 1927, that a British Cup was being considered, between the finalists of the English Baseball Association and Welsh Baseball Union championships. By 1927 the English Baseball Association had three divisions, with a total of 23 clubs across Merseyside and attendances were outstripping those at greyhound racing stadiums. A number of international rugby, football and cricket players were taking up the game and Everton and Liverpool football clubs were heavily involved. Finally, in May 1929, the rules of the English Baseball Association were copyrighted. The growth of the international fixture had brought increased scrutiny on the game's arbitration and rules, as such the English Baseball Association and the Welsh Baseball Union formed the International Baseball Board to oversee the internationals in 1927. Finally, in May 1929, the rules of the English Baseball Association were copyrighted, emphasising their role in the birth of the codified sport and their governorship of the rules that controlled the game.

=== Depression, the Second World War and the second peak of the American game ===
The Great Depression saw further increases in the number of clubs and players, and local club matches would attract thousands of spectators as community sports provided a welcome distraction during a turbulent period. The Cardiff & District League boasted 37 teams by 1929, 19 of which were based in the working class areas of Splott and Grangetown alone. In the inter-war years British baseball had a short lived foothold in on the island of Ireland, leading to the formation of an Irish Baseball Union, who organised for a team to travel to Liverpool to play in their first ever international game against England, in June 1933. The team included players from St. Mary's, St. Oswald's, British and Irish, Hibernians, Independent and Connaught ball clubs. England won by an innings and 42 runs. In October 1934 the English Baseball Association signed an agreement to travel to Edinburgh in 1935, to begin the process of introducing the game into Scotland, though a number of well known Scottish players such as Billy Lamont, Charlie Moore and Donald MacKinlay were already playing in leagues in Liverpool. In the first game, the Scottish defeated the English at Edinburgh by 24 runs to 3, with over 5,000 in attendance. The return game at Bootle attracted a crowd of over 3,000 spectators, to see Scotland triumph again, 4 runs to 0. These two games were played to the American code.

The 1930s saw American baseball's popularity peak again in Britain with professional teams sharing grounds with soccer clubs (10,000 spectators attending the biggest games), and saw the British team winning the inaugural Baseball World Cup in 1938. The American game was supported by more touring teams from America and Japan; this afforded the Welsh teams a chance to test themselves against the more widely appreciated (and often professional) American teams. In one such game on August 27, 1938, the Penylan club side beat the London Americans at Cardiff Arms Park. The contest saw one innings under "Welsh" rules, and three innings under U.S. rules.

The decade also saw further moves to establish American baseball on Merseyside. The moves met with a mixed reception among players of the British game with some apprehensive the move would end the older game in England. Although British baseball would survive, the American league had a detrimental effect throughout the decade, with players, crowds and backers leaving the sport for a professional career in a game gaining support throughout England. An American league was also established in Cardiff in 1939, but the professional American game ended with the outbreak of war, and would never regain such widespread popularity.

=== Post-war zenith ===
Although internationals ceased during wartime, sides would stage successful games with the crews of American warships using either American or Welsh rules. Home victories emboldened the local's belief in the ability of the Welsh players. This pride and belief was evident when the annual internationals resumed in 1948 at Cardiff's Castle Grounds, with a record 16,000 spectators in attendance and Welsh legend Ted Peterson leading Wales to victory. This increasing popularity of the game saw it develop a distinct community appeal. In addition to the now established clubs, churches, stores, factories, and bars would form teams, and the game became the heart of social activities for many, especially in Cardiff. The sport was also enjoying popularity In England, with a number of Exhibition games played in London and teams established in Bristol and Coventry.

The 1950s and 1960s saw more dominance for the Welsh international team. Welsh legend Paddy Hennessey made his international debut in the 1957 win over England. He would go on to be widely recognised as a great of the game, and the fastest bowler of the era. The 1964 International saw Hennessey (as captain) demolish his rivals' batting line up for a record six runs in 30 balls and just nine minutes in front of a crowd of 6,000 at the Maindy Stadium. This record is notable as it would not be surpassed for 50 years, when Wales international Matthew Hopkins managed the same feat for the loss of just one run in the 2014 fixture at Whiteheads Ground, Newport. The record remains one of the longest standing in global sports.

=== Decline in popularity and the modern era ===
The sport gained a new audience in Wales as live coverage of the international fixture and some club matches became a feature of Welsh television in the 1970s and 1980s, but the last decades of the century were generally characterised by a continued decline in attendances and participation. In 1989 reserves of the long used worsted made Webber ball were exhausted, following the manufacturer Jaques of London, ceasing production. Various American made balls were tried out but found to be heavier and slightly larger than the traditional ball. The international fixture continued to draw interest with BBC Cymru Wales broadcast highlights of the international game until the 1990s; by then the match was seen as a curiosity with radio and TV features the limit of its national exposure. The prospect of watching Wales' star rugby players play the game also ended in 1995 with the introduction of professional contracts, ceasing their unsanctioned participation in other sports.

The international match between England and Wales in 2006

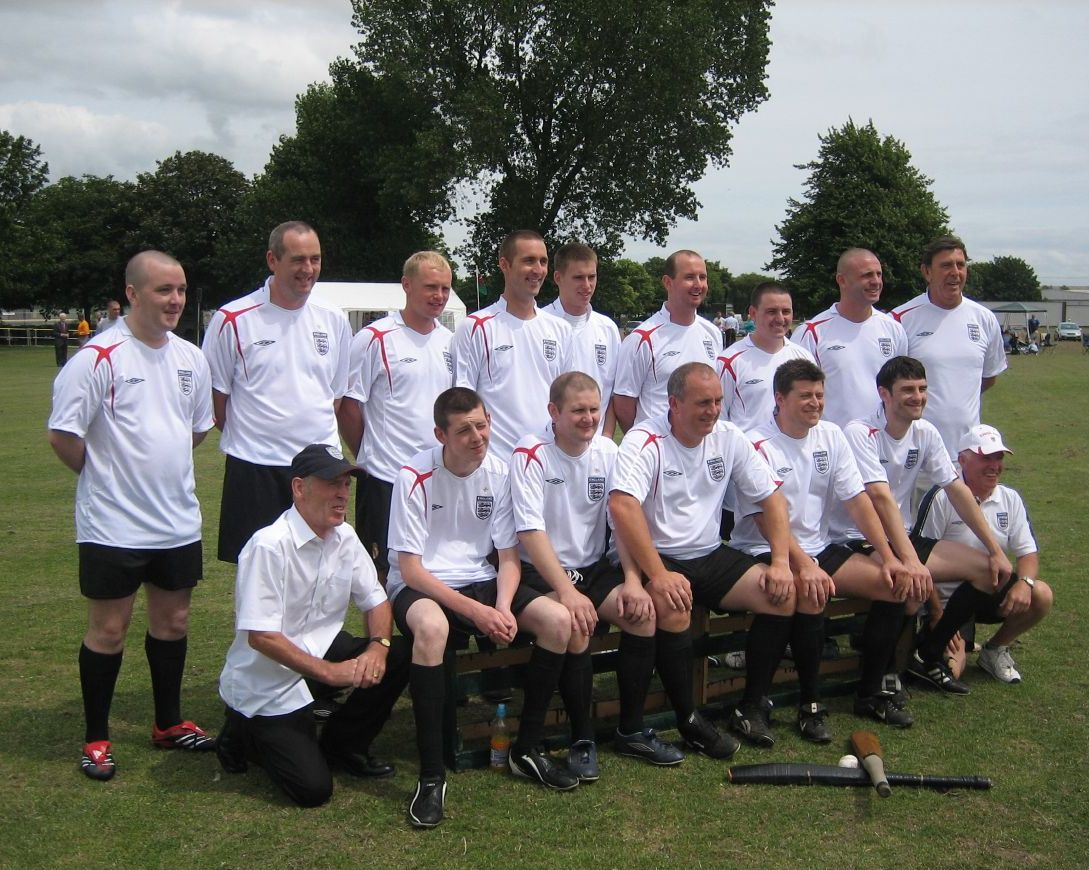
The English (EBA) team

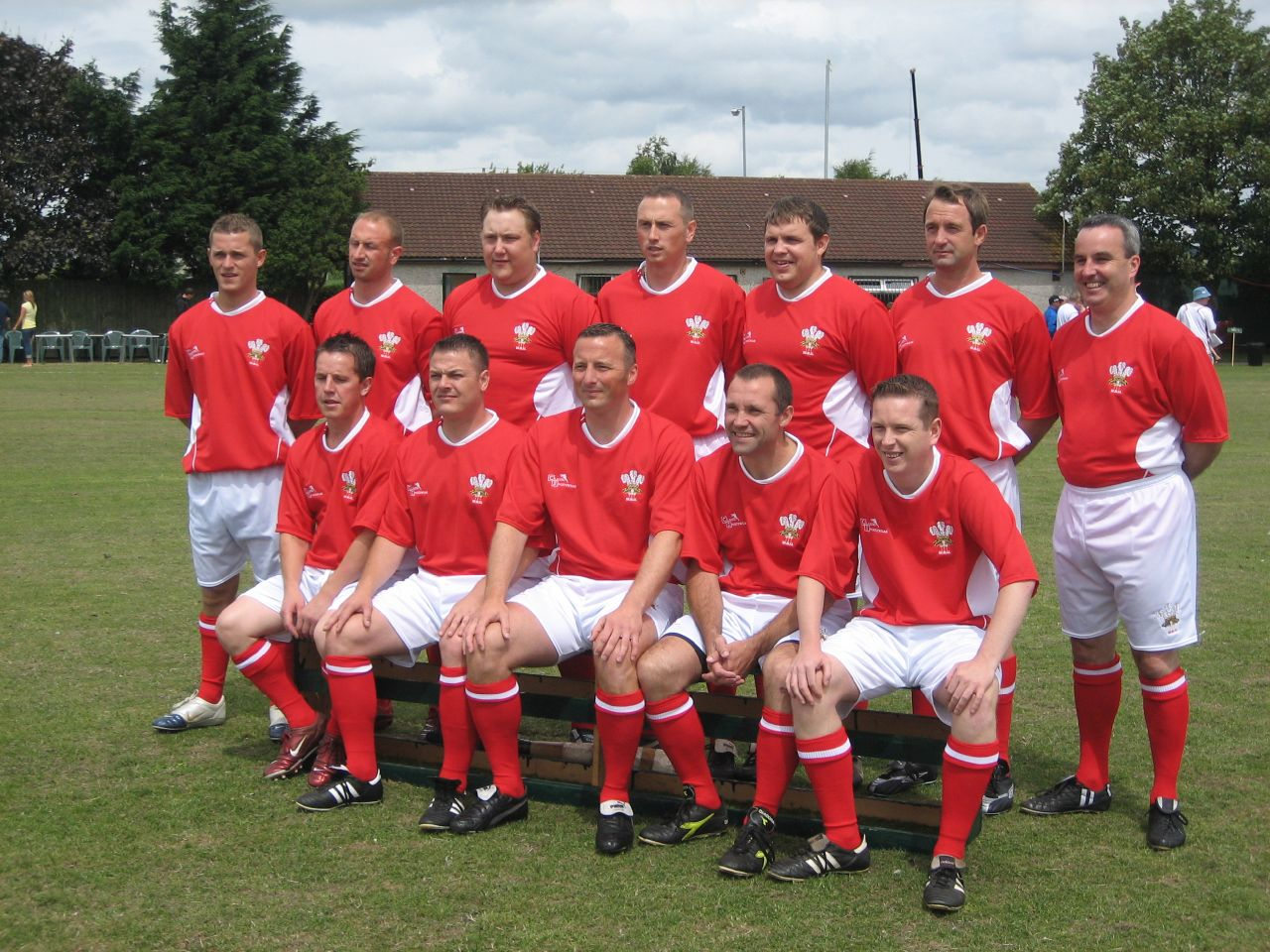
The Welsh (WBU) team

By 2006 participation levels in England had slumped considerably to a point where only four clubs remained active: All Saints, Anfield, Breckside and Townsend. The centenary international was held in Cardiff on 19 July 2008, with Wales winning their tenth victory in a row by an innings and 44. As well as the full international, similar internationals are held for 'B' teams and for junior grades. The match was the 83rd international played between the two nations, and was Wales' 61st victory; England had won 20 and two games were declared draws due to inclement weather (1957 and 1998). Spectator numbers were reported to be between 1,000 and 2,000.

The annual England versus Wales fixture continued until 2015 when England withdrew, unable to field enough players. The end of the international fixture (and the exposure it brought the game) had a dramatic effect on player numbers in Wales. By 2017, the Welsh men's league and cup fixtures were abandoned mid-season due to a lack of players at some member clubs. Since then the men's game has continued through ad-hoc fixtures. The women's league remains in operation. Subsequent years have seen the Welsh Baseball Union working with local councils to reintroduce the sport into high schools. This has seen the sport played beyond its traditional areas (especially the South Wales Valleys), as the game allows for mixed gender participation, is easy to understand, and can be adapted to accommodate a high number of players.

== Notable players ==
Among those who achieved fame through their baseball exploits were Ted Peterson, whose international appearances stretched from the 1930s to 1960s, Paddy Hennessey, renowned for his fast bowling, and left-hander Edward "Teddy" Jones whose 1935 run record held for 47 years. The sport's appeal to winter footballers attracted a number of players more notable for their rugby or soccer careers. Welsh Rugby players Viv Huzzey, Terry Holmes, Mark Ring, David Bishop, and Wigan Rugby League legend and record points scorer Jim Sullivan all played the sport, often during rugby's off season. Association footballers include Welshmen John Toshack, George Whitcombe, Terry Yorath, Nathan Blake and Phil Dwyer, and Everton and England football star Dixie Dean.

== Differences between British baseball and North American games ==
The sport differs in a number of ways from the internationally known game of North American baseball. The rules today are still very much in line with the rules created by the National Rounders Association, between 1887 and 1888.

- Delivery of the ball – The ball is thrown underarm, similar to softball. As in cricket the delivery is known as bowling. In North American baseball it is delivered overhand, sidearm, or underarm and is called pitching.
- Number of players – There are 11 players in a team with no substitutions allowed. North American baseball uses nine players on a team (not counting a "designated hitter"); while substitutions are allowed, a player who leaves the game may not re-enter it.
- Number of innings – (Note that British baseball uses the cricket terminology of "innings" as both singular and plural, while baseball uses "inning" for the singular.) In British baseball, each team has two innings. An innings ends when all 11 players are either dismissed or stranded on base. A regulation game of North American baseball consists of nine innings, and each team's half of an inning ends when three outs (dismissals) are recorded.
- Posts/Bases – Where North American baseball has bases the British version has 'posts' (sometimes referred to as bases). These are designated by poles rather than bags.
- Bat – the bat has a flat striking surface, where in North American baseball it is entirely round.
- Scoring system – In British baseball a player scores a run for every base they reach after hitting the ball. The batter will not subsequently score when moving around the bases on another player's hit. The equivalent of a home run scores four runs. As in cricket a bonus run can be awarded for excessively-wide deliveries. In North American baseball, a player scores a run only on a successful circuit of all four bases, whether on his own or another player's hit, or by other means such as a walk or stolen base.
- Field of play – The British game has no foul area, a ball can be legally hit (and scored off of) in any direction, where in North American baseball it has to be hit in the zone bounded by the lines to first base and third base.

Despite these similarities with cricket, the game is much more like North American baseball in style and operates on a near identical, but smaller, diamond. There are also many similarities to rounders, which is often considered a transitional game between cricket and baseball. The basic concepts of British baseball cross-blend the basic concepts of cricket and the more standard versions of rounders.

== In popular culture ==
The sport is the subject of a song, "The Baseball Song", by the Hennessys, from their album Cardiff After Dark.

== References and further reading ==
=== Further reading ===
- Martin Johnes, 'Baseball, class and community in south Wales, c.1880–1950', International Journal of the History of Sport, 17,4 (2000), 153–66.
- John Arlott, ed. (1975). The Oxford Companion to Sports and Games. Oxford University Press
- Andrew Hignell and Gwyn Prescott, eds (2007). Cardiff Sporting Greats. Stadia
