= Philip Sidney Whitcombe =

English cricketer and British Army general

Major-General Philip Sidney Whitcombe CB OBE
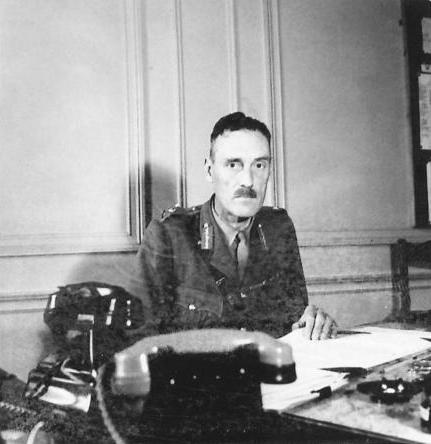
- Whitcombe in 1943
- Born: 3 October 1893; Windsor, Berkshire, England
- Died: 9 August 1989 (aged 95); Hindhead, Surrey, England
- Relatives: Philip Arthur Whitcombe (son)
- Military career
- Allegiance: United Kingdom
- Branch: British Army
- Service years: 1914–1947
- Rank: Major-General
- Service number: 4983
- Units: Durham Light Infantry; Royal Army Service Corps
- Conflicts: First World War; Second World War
- Awards: Companion of the Order of the Bath; Officer of the Order of the British Empire; Mentioned in Despatches

Major-General Philip Sidney Whitcombe, CB, OBE (3 October 1893 – 9 August 1989) was a senior British Army officer and an English cricketer active from 1922 to 1931 who played for Essex and in India. He was born in Windsor, Berkshire, and died in Hindhead, Surrey. He appeared in four first-class matches as a right-handed batsman who bowled right arm fast medium pace. He scored 81 runs with a highest score of 32* and took no wickets.

On 1 May 1925 he was seconded from his regiment.

His son Philip Arthur Whitcombe was also a first-class cricketer.
