= Philip Arthur Whitcombe =

English cricketer (1923–2015)

Philip Whitcombe
Personal information
- Full name: Philip Arthur Whitcombe
- Born: 23 April 1923; Kensington, London, England
- Died: 11 August 2015 (aged 92); Churt, Surrey, England
- Height: 6 ft 4 in (1.93 m)
- Batting: Right-handed
- Bowling: Right-arm fast-medium
- Relatives: Philip Sidney Whitcombe (father); Robert Whitcombe (grandfather)

Domestic team information
- Years: Team
- 1947 to 1949: Oxford University
- 1948: Middlesex
- 1954 to 1960: Free Foresters

Career statistics
| Competition | First-class |
|---|---|
| Matches | 37 |
| Runs scored | 956 |
| Batting average | 18.74 |
| 100s/50s | 0/3 |
| Top score | 68 |
| Balls bowled | 6417 |
| Wickets | 112 |
| Bowling average | 22.22 |
| 5 wickets in innings | 5 |
| 10 wickets in match | 0 |
| Best bowling | 7/51 |
| Catches/stumpings | 23/− |
- Source: Cricinfo, 20 May 2014

Philip Arthur Whitcombe (23 April 1923 − 11 August 2015) was an English cricketer who played first-class cricket in England from 1947 to 1960.

== Life and career ==
Whitcombe's father, Major-General Philip Sidney Whitcombe, had played some first-class cricket while serving in India, and also played for Berkshire. Philip junior was educated at Winchester, where he was a contemporary of Hubert Doggart, a future England cricketer. During the Second World War he served as an officer with the Royal Horse Artillery of the British Army, with the service number of 249035, before going up to Christ Church, Oxford. He played in the Oxford University team from 1947 to 1949 and won a Blue three years running.

Whitcombe's most notable season was 1948, when he took 47 wickets at an average of 15.93. In Oxford's match against Yorkshire he bowled Len Hutton in each innings, finishing with figures of 5 for 32 and 2 for 33. In the University Match he played a large part in Oxford's innings victory: "Well-maintained length at fast-medium pace with the pavilion as background, coming from such a high delivery as that of the six feet four inches tall Whitcombe, seemed beyond interpretation by the Cambridge students, and in taking seven wickets for 51 runs he influenced the proceedings to such an extent that the other Oxford bowlers invariably checked any suggestion of easy scoring." A few days later he opened the bowling for the Gentlemen, taking the wickets of Cyril Washbrook (twice) and Denis Compton. A few days after that, playing only his second match for Middlesex, he dismissed Bill Brown and Don Bradman to leave the touring Australians 28 for 2.

Troubled by injuries, Whitcombe played no more county cricket after 1948, and after the university season ended in 1949 he played no first-class cricket until 1954, when he began playing occasionally for Free Foresters, whose president he became.

Whitcombe became a shipping agent and then a sheep farmer in Surrey. While working in India as a shipping agent for P&O, he met his wife-to-be, Rosemary, daughter of Lord Clydesmuir, the last Governor of Bombay. He and Rosemary (1927−2009) had a son and a daughter.
