= Frank Whitcombe Jr =

English rugby union player

Frank William Whitcombe (21 July 1936 – 2009) was a rugby union footballer of the 1950s, 1960s and 1970s who played Rugby Union (RU) for Bradford RFC, Keighley RUFC Northern Command and Army Rugby Union, playing at Prop, and representative level Rugby Union (RU) for Yorkshire, and North Eastern counties.

== Early life ==
Frank was born on 21 July 1936 at 20 Nell Lane in Withington, a suburb of Manchester where his rugby-playing father, also named Frank and originally from Cardiff, had turned professional on 18 September 1935 with Broughton Rangers Rugby league Club who paid £100 for him to turn professional. Of which £90 was to buy him out of the Army leaving him £10 to start a new life in Manchester with his young family.

Frank senior's new club provided him with a job as a zookeeper at Belle Vue Zoological Gardens where Rangers played on the Belle Vue Stadium inside the Motorcycle Speedway track. At this time Belle Vue was the Leisure Centre for the North West of England. When Whitcombe senior was signed by Bradford Northern for a world record fee in 1938, the family crossed the Pennines. Frank Whitcombe senior, a huge man with a matching presence on the field retired from the game in 1949 after an illustrious rugby career.

After moving to Bradford the family lived at 109 Wibsey Park Avenue close to the Odsal Stadium home of Bradford Northern. Frank junior attended Buttershaw St Paul's Church of England Primary School and later, after passing his 11-plus, Grange Boys' Grammar School. After leaving school he began an electrical apprenticeship before being called up for National Service.

== Rugby career Bradford RFC ==
Frank Whitcombe (329 Appearances) and his brother Brian Whitcombe (174 Appearances) went on to give long and loyal service to Bradford Rugby Football Club. They began their rugby careers with Sedbergh Boys' Club playing junior Rugby League. The club was based near to their home in Wibsey, Bradford, before switching to Bradford RFC.

Under the guidance of the Bradford RFC second team captain, David Firth, both settled quickly to the union game and soon broke into the First Team. Frank making his first appearance for the 1st team at 16 years, like his father before him as a prop forward, Brian made the 1st team age 17 as a back row forward.

Frank became part of a formidable front row with Peter Crowther at hooker and Peter Harrison at tight head prop the trio went on to play for Bradford together 12 years.

Frank captained Bradford for two seasons and played in their Yorkshire Cup winning side of 1966 against Harrogate at Cross Green, Otley in 1966 under the captaincy of Mike Dixon. Playing for Bradford – who had fixtures in London against the likes of Wasps and the Midlands including Coventry & Leicester Tigers – meant he was often away much of Saturday evening, the busiest time of the week at the Airedale Heifer, so he decided to play instead for Keighley RUFC a club he later captained. When his playing days were over in the first team he took over the second team captaincy for several seasons, ensuring the next generation of players knew how to do it the right way. Frank was a life member at Keighley Rugby Club.

== Most Bradford RFC appearances ==
Peter V Crowther 414 – Mike Dixon 369 – Frank W Whitcombe 329 – Jim Golby 318 – Phil Carter 255 – David S Lightowler 275 – Roger Pickering 255 – Geoff Cooke 244 – Foss Howard 235.

== Representative honours ==
Frank Whitcombe was the youngest player to play for Yorkshire, making his debut for the county as a prop forward at the age of 17. He went on to make 31 appearances for Yorkshire in the County Championship, including the County Championship Final of 1963 which Yorkshire lost in the last minutes 13 – 10 to Warwickshire at Coundon Road, Coventry. The Yorkshire side was captained by Bradford's Colin Heighton. In the same year he was named as a reserve for the England final trial at Twickenham. He represented the North Eastern Counties against Wilson Whineray's 5th New Zealand All Blacks team on their tour of Britain at the Great Yorkshire Show grounds Harrogate on 11 January 1964, a game the North Eastern Counties lost by 11–17. Frank also played in Bradford's Yorkshire Cup winning team of 1966 in their 8–3 victory over Harrogate at Cross Green, Otley.

Frank did his national service and served with the Royal Corps of Signals who had an outstanding rugby team at this time. Here he represented the Army Rugby Union for a full season and was selected for his first cap against the Royal Navy at Twickenham. However, due to the death of his father he was unable to take his place in the Army team.

== Captain's gesture ==
Yorkshire Cup 1966. The team spirit that enabled Bradford to beat Harrogate in the Yorkshire Cup final at Otley was demonstrated when Mike Dixon and Frank Whitcombe went up together at the end of the match to receive the trophy.

Whitcombe the club's captain had been out of action for a good part of the season through injury and during his absence Dixon had taken over the leadership. So well did Bradford play that when Whitcombe returned from injury he insisted that Dixon should continue as captain and it was Dixon who last night led the side in their first cup final triumph for 41 years.

With an equally sporting gesture Dixon insisted that Whitcombe should share with him the honour of receiving the cup.

== Notable relatives ==
Frank Whitcombe Jr was the son of the Bradford Northern and Great Britain rugby league footballer; Frank Whitcombe. His uncle, George Whitcombe was an association footballer for Cardiff City and baseball captain for Wales His son is the rugby union prop for England 'B' and Leicester Tigers, Martin Whitcombe.

Frank Whitcombe Jr was son-in-law to the former Keighley rugby league scrum half Thomas Cockcroft and brother-in-law to the former Keighley winger William Cockcroft.

Frank Whitcombe Jr was the grandfather rugby union prop for England (Under-20s) and Leicester Tigers (2019/20 Development Squad); James William Whitcombe (born 20 November 2000 (age 24)).

== Life after rugby ==
Following the death of his father on 17 January 1958, Frank was discharged from the army on compassionate grounds to allow him to help run the family business "The Airedale Heifer" public house at Sandbeds, Keighley, along with his mother and Mollie. Whitcombe married Mollie Cockcroft at Holy Trinity Church, Lawkholme in Keighley, on 24 January 1961. Trevor Foster MBE took the place of Frank's father at the wedding.

A popular stop-off for many rugby friends and rugby supporters which the family ran successfully for nearly 30 years until Frank and Mollie moved on in 1981 to live in East Morton. Frank devoted his time after retirement to his family and walking in the Yorkshire Dales.

Whitcombe died in 2009 at his home in East Morton aged 73 after a short illness. At his funeral there was standing room only in the village church, St Lukes. Among Frank's pallbearers was his former Yorkshire prop forward and teammate Rodney Childs. Mr Dean Richards MBE read the Eulogy to Frank Whitcombe's life . A week prior to his death, Frank was on the touchline supporting Keighley RUFC

== Honoured at Keighley RUFC ==
Frank Whitcombe joined Keighley RUFC in season 1967–68, taking over from E D Thomas as 1st team Captain. Frank Captained Keighley 1st team for the next four seasons until 1970–71.

At the beginning of the 1971 season, Whitcombe took on the vice captain's job in support of the new club captain Kevin McGee; he continued in this job for the next three seasons. Whitcombe then held the position of honorary trainer from 1974 until 1977 before handing over to John Longbottom. Whitcombe was a life member at Keighley rugby club

Following his retirement from the rugby, Whitcombe turned to coaching the Keighley Colts, the club's U19 side a position he held for over 15 years. When he finally stepped down from coaching, he continued as a regular supporter on the touchline at Keighley RUFC.

On 29 August 2010 the main stand was named the "Frank Whitcombe Stand" as a tribute to Whitcombe's hard work at the club over many years, especially with the young players at Keighley RUFC. A game took place between Keighley RUFC and Skipton RFC, coached by his son Martin, after which Mrs Mollie Whitcombe, Frank's widow, after a short ceremony officially named the stand.
