= Welsh Baseball Union =

Governing body of British baseball in Wales

The Welsh Baseball Union (WBU) (founded 1892) is the national governing body of the traditional code of British baseball (or Welsh baseball) in Wales.

It is a member of the International Baseball Board. The WBU organises the men's and youth league and cup competitions, as well as selecting and managing the Wales international teams at adult and youth level.

The Welsh Baseball Union is based in Cardiff.

== See also ==
- Welsh Ladies Baseball Union
