= Jules Hudson =

British television presenter and producer (born 1970)

- Born: Julian Harold Hudson; 9 January 1970 (age 56); Colchester, Essex, England, United Kingdom
- Education: Colchester High School, Essex; Ipswich School, Suffolk
- Alma mater: Lampeter University; Durham University
- Occupations: Archaeologist; television producer; television presenter; former army officer
- Website: https://www.juleshudson.co.uk

Julian Harold Hudson (born 9 January 1970) is an English archaeologist, television producer and presenter, best known for presenting the BBC series Escape to the Country. He also frequently presents sections of the environmental documentary series Countryfile on BBC One.

== Early life ==
Hudson was born in Colchester, in Essex, in 1970. He is the son of Pam and Cliff Hudson. He was brought up in a bed and breakfast hotel run by his mother for 40 years, in the former village of Lexden, now a suburb of Colchester. His father was a mechanical engineer and a technical director at E. H. Bentall & Co in the large village of Heybridge in the Maldon District of Essex, frequently working abroad.

Hudson attributes his conversational style of presentation to his experience from a young age of meeting people at the bed and breakfast from many different backgrounds and nationalities.

== Education ==
Hudson was educated at two independent schools: at Colchester High School and later Ipswich School, in the county town of Ipswich in Suffolk, where he boarded from the age of eleven. After school, he studied Field Archaeology at Lampeter University (renamed the University of Wales, Lampeter in 1996), in the town of Lampeter in Ceredigion in south west Wales, followed by military training at RMA Sandhurst in Berkshire. He later took a master's degree in Archaeology at Durham University. He attended Durham from 1994-1995 and was a member of University College.

== Life and career ==
After initially briefly pursuing a career as an army officer, Hudson moved into TV production in 1996, focusing on historical programmes.

Working initially for Discovery Channel, he then moved to Channel 4's Time Team, BBC 2's Horizon, and three military history series for the BBC's Richard Holmes. After becoming lead presenter on ITV Meridian's The Making of England, and making Have I Been Here Before? with Phillip Schofield, he developed and produced the series Revival for ITV, which gained a Royal Television Society nomination.

Since 2007, he has been one of the main presenters on BBC's Escape to the Country. He was the initial presenter on BBC One's Britain's Empty Homes, fronting the first series from January 2010 to February 2012. He presented the ten episodes of Defenders of the Sky for the History Channel H2 in 2015.

Hudson contributes regularly to Countryfile Magazine and to Homes & Gardens magazine. An article published in 2022 indicates that he is a "regular contributor to BBC Radio Wales". He also authored the book "Walled Gardens".

In August 1994 he graduated from Royal Military Academy Sandhurst and was commissioned as a second lieutenant in the Army Reserve, specifically in the Royal Monmouthshire Royal Engineers. According to a June 2022 report, he was "assigned to 77 Brigade – a combined Regular and Reserve unit".

=== President, Campaign for the Protection of Rural Wales, (CPRW) ===
In 2015 Jules Hudson became President of CPRW, a Welsh national charity that aims to secure the protection and enhancement of the country's landscapes and environment. He has entered enthusiastically into work of the charity and in November 2015 re-launched the Best kept village competition for Montgomeryshire. It is hoped that this will evolve into a competition covering all of Wales.

== Personal life ==
Hudson lives in Herefordshire with his wife Tania and son, Jack.
