= Campaign for the Protection of Rural Wales =

Welsh environmental charity

- Ymgyrch Diogelu Cymru Wledig (Welsh)
- Formation: 1928
- Type: Environmental Organisation
- Purpose: To secure the protection and enhancement landscapes and environment of Wales.
- Location: Ty Gwyn, 31 High Street, Welshpool, Powys SY21 7YD
- Members: 1020
- Activities: Environmental Campaigns, Lectures, Day Schools, Rural Wales Awards and Rural Wales Magazine
- President: Jules Hudson
- Director: Peter Ogden
- Website: CPRW

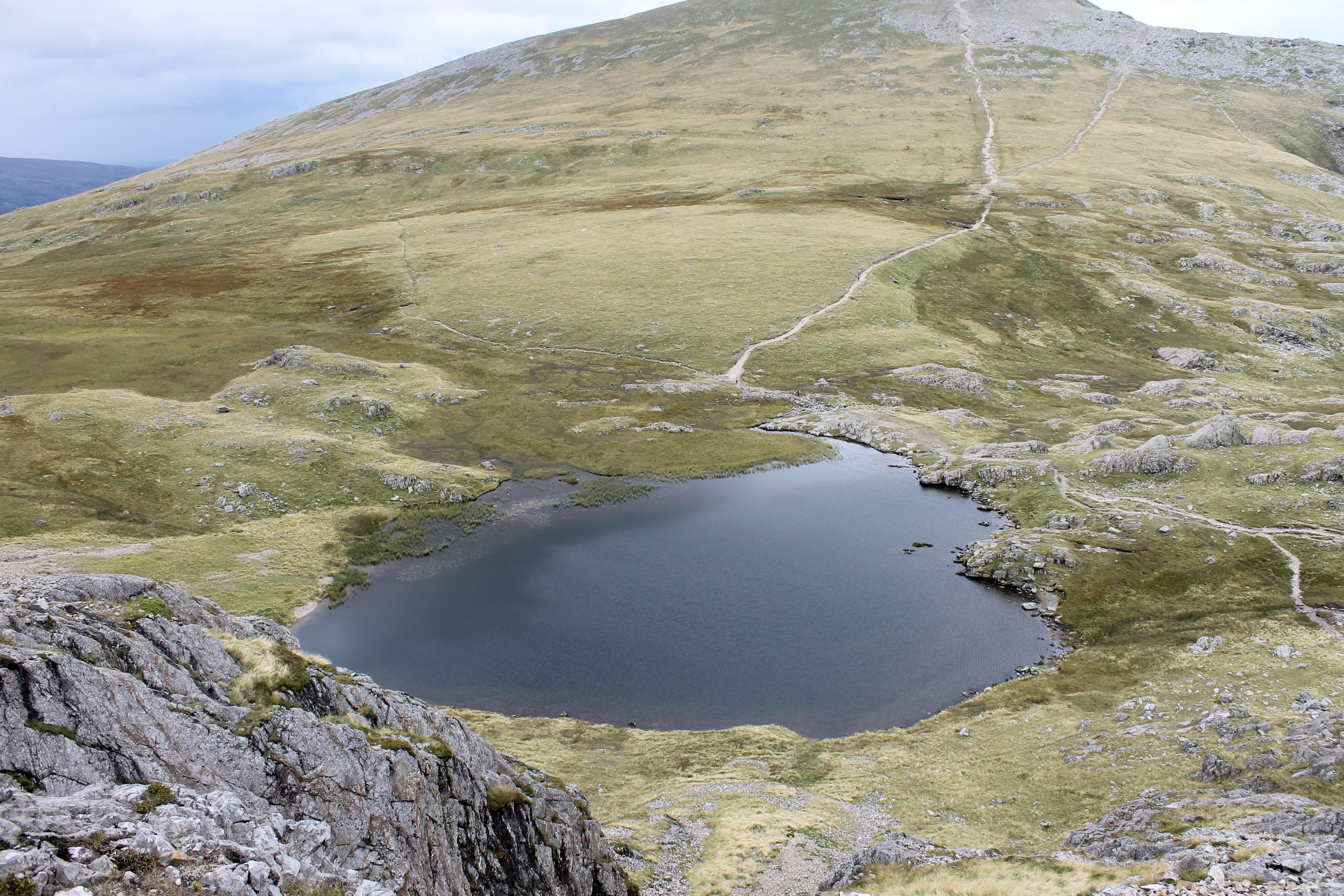
Llyn y Cŵn in the Snowdonia National Park

The Campaign for the Protection of Rural Wales (CPRW; Welsh: Ymgyrch Diogelu Cymru Wledig, YDCW), originally named the Council for the Preservation of Rural Wales, is a charity in Wales that aims to secure the protection and enhancement of the country's landscapes and environment.

It was founded in 1928. The name was changed to the Council for the Protection of Rural Wales in 1962, and then to the Campaign for the Protection of Rural Wales in 1991. Past presidents have included Megan Lloyd George (1949–1965), Wynford Vaughan Thomas (1968–1972) and Baroness Eirene White (1973–1989). Clough Williams-Ellis was the Chairman of CPRW from 1929 to 1946 and the President from 1946 to 1948. The organisation's offices are in Welshpool.

== Organisation ==
The Campaign for the Protection of Rural Wales (CPRW) is a national charity, organised in a structure comprising a central National Executive Committee and regional branches. The members of the National Executive Committee are Trustees of the charity and comprise the officers of the charity (elected by the general membership) and up to 12 members elected by a Council, made up of representatives of each branch and of affiliated organisations and members elected in their own right. The Council meets four times a year, once in North Wales, once in South Wales and twice in mid-Wales. The Director advises the National Executive Committee and the membership on policy and engages with the Welsh Government, the Welsh Assembly and other national organisations, as well as organising nationwide campaigns. In parallel with the central management structure, there are 14 regional branches across Wales, whose members are volunteers, and whose principal function is to consider and campaign on local planning and development issues.

=== Rural Wales Magazine ===
This topical magazine on Rural Wales is published three times a year.

=== Rural Wales Awards ===
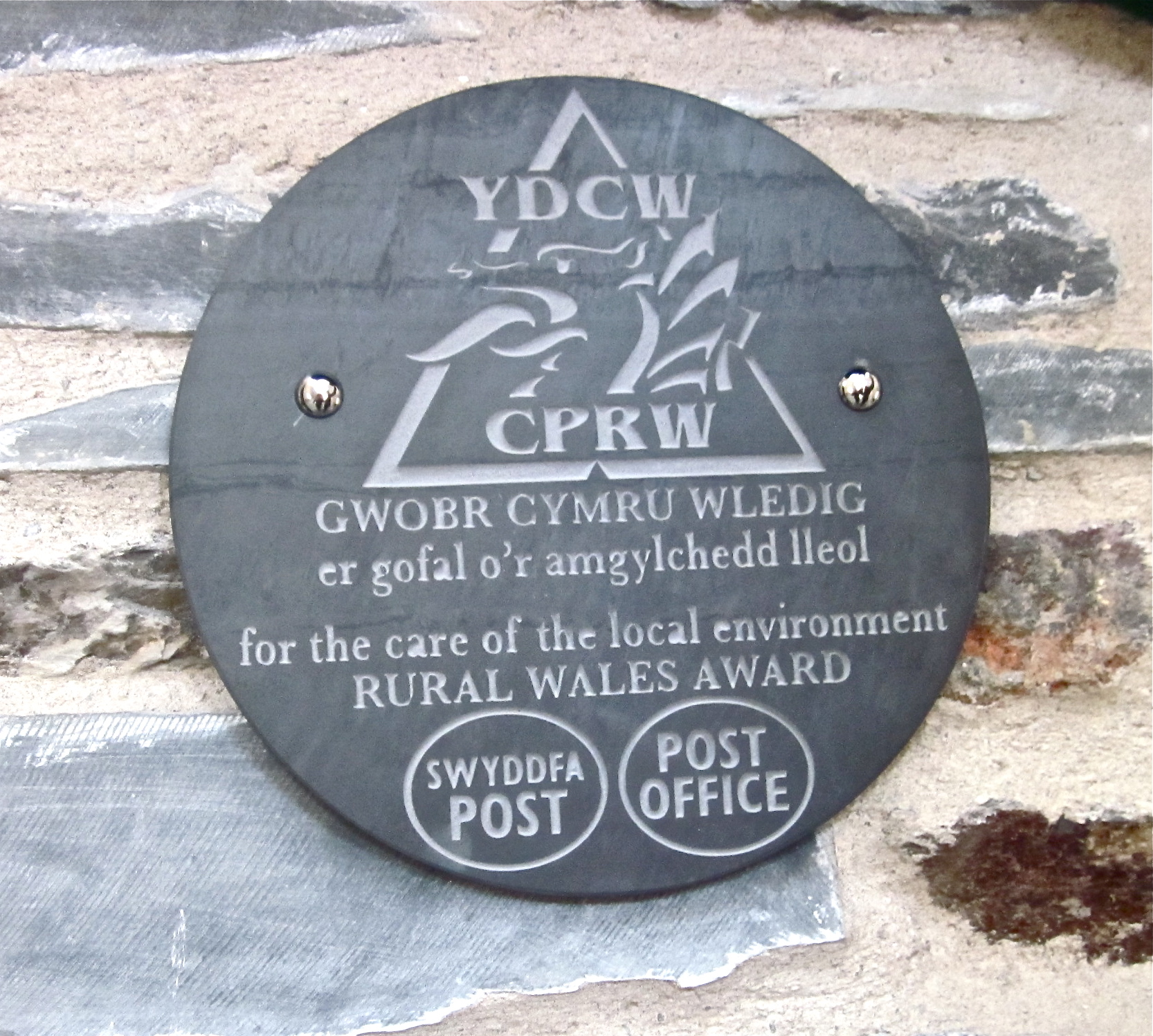
CPRW Rural Wales Award

Awards made by the Regional Branches and sponsored by Post Office. These include:

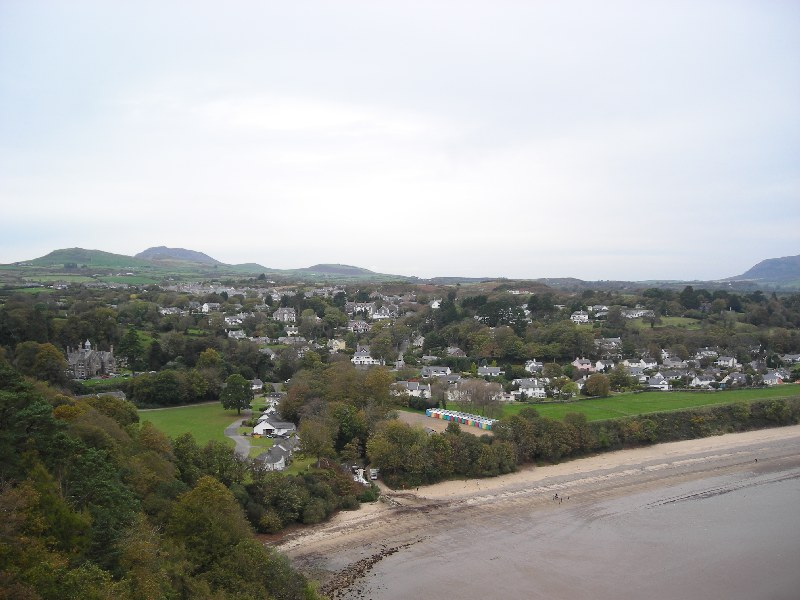
Oriel Plas Glyn-y-Weddw (on Left) at Llanbedrog

- Caernarfonshire. The Welsh Fruit Tree Nursery on the outskirts of Bangor, for their work in the preservation and development of indigenous Welsh fruit trees. These include the discovery and propagation of the Bardsey Apple and the Denbigh Plum, while a previously unknown local variety of pear was found at Penygroes, which is being propagated.
- Caernarfonshire. The Winllan Project for the development of Oriel, Plas Glyn-y-Weddw at Llanbedrog, near Pwllheli, as a flourishing centre of the arts, culture and tourism in Southern Llŷn, comprising the re-opening of historic woodlands and trails around the All Wales Coastal Path and the construction of an innovative amphitheatre and interpretation centre.
- Caernarfonshire. GreenWood Forest Park -Gelli Gyffyrd at Y Felinheli. The creation of 17 acres of natural woodland with well-laid paths and broad walks, passing through a variety of environments with plenty to interest botanists and naturalists, and fine views across to Snowdon and beyond. Provides children's activities and ecological education. The care of the woodland estate and the sustainable principles on which they run their successful attraction, has brought employment to a deeply rural area.
- Clwyd. The Glynne Arms, Hawarden, Flintshire. A Grade II Listed building that was in disrepair and was renovated by the Gladstone Estate. Now employs 26 persons, using locally grown produce and provides facilities for local community organisations and functions.

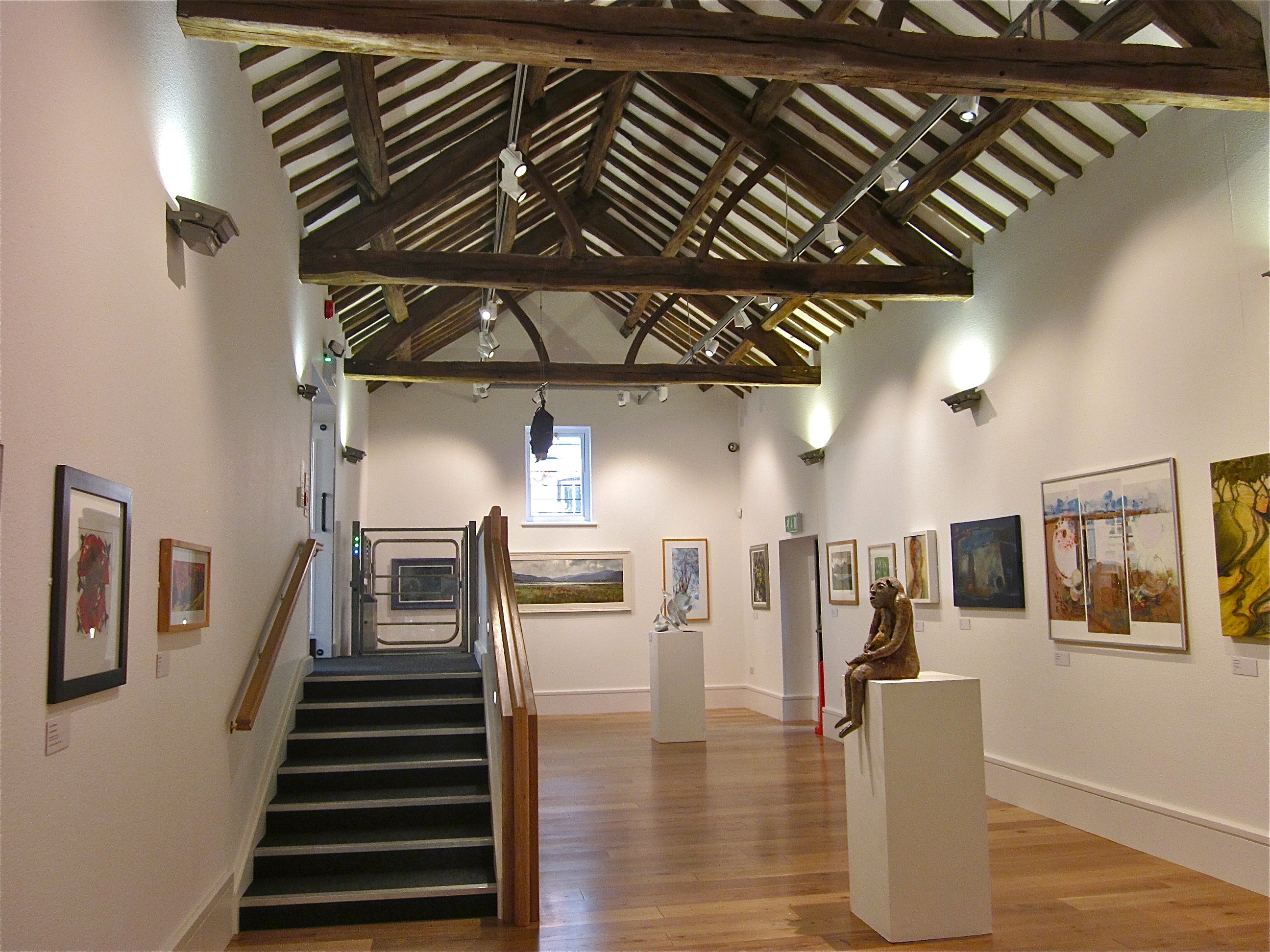
Display gallery at the Tannery, MOMA, Machynlleth

- Brecon and Radnor Branch. In September 2014 Sue and Philip Bowen of Penlanole, Radnorshire were presented with the Branch's Rural Wales Award. Sue and Philip are inspirational leaders of community arts work in mid Wales, contributing towards education in drama particularly among young people. Their work is demonstrated through their 'Shakespeare Link' project at the Willow Globe theatre at their home between Rhayader and Builth Wells. From 2014 the Branch will be presenting the Louis Hurley Prize for architectural design in the countryside. An annual award, to reward the sensitivity and appropriateness of a new or refurbished building in its landscape.
- Montgomeryshire. On 5 November 2014 the Montgomeryshire Branch made a Rural Wales award to MOMA at Machynlleth for the restoration of the Tannery. The award was made in recognition of the sensitive and high quality restoration of this historic building, which had past links with rural life, the tanning industry and farming in the general locality. The Tannery was officially opened as an additional art and sculpture gallery at MOMA in May 2014, following its restoration from an ivy-clad derelict building.

=== Best Kept Village competition ===
This was organised in Wales by the Branches of CPRW from 1954 onwards and led to the enhancement of many Welsh villages The competition was discontinued in the early 1990s. Some villages such as Berriew in Montgomeryshire was awarded a Best Kept Village Award on a number of occasions from 1970 onwards. CPRE still continues with its Best Kept Village Competitions.

In October 2015 the Best Kept village competition was relaunched in Montgomeryshire for the Montgomeryshire Branch by Jules Hudson. The revived competition was sponsored by Morris, Marshall and Poole during 2016. Previously the main focus was the aesthetic of the village, but the emphasis was now on villages with a vibrant community spirit that created satisfaction and well-being among inhabitants as well as providing local services and facilities. It will not be about finding the most beautiful village, nor the most ancient or picturesque, but one that is cared for. If the competition is successful, it will be extended to other branches of the CPRW.

== Campaigns ==
=== The North Wales Power (and Traction) Company and the British Electricity Authority ===
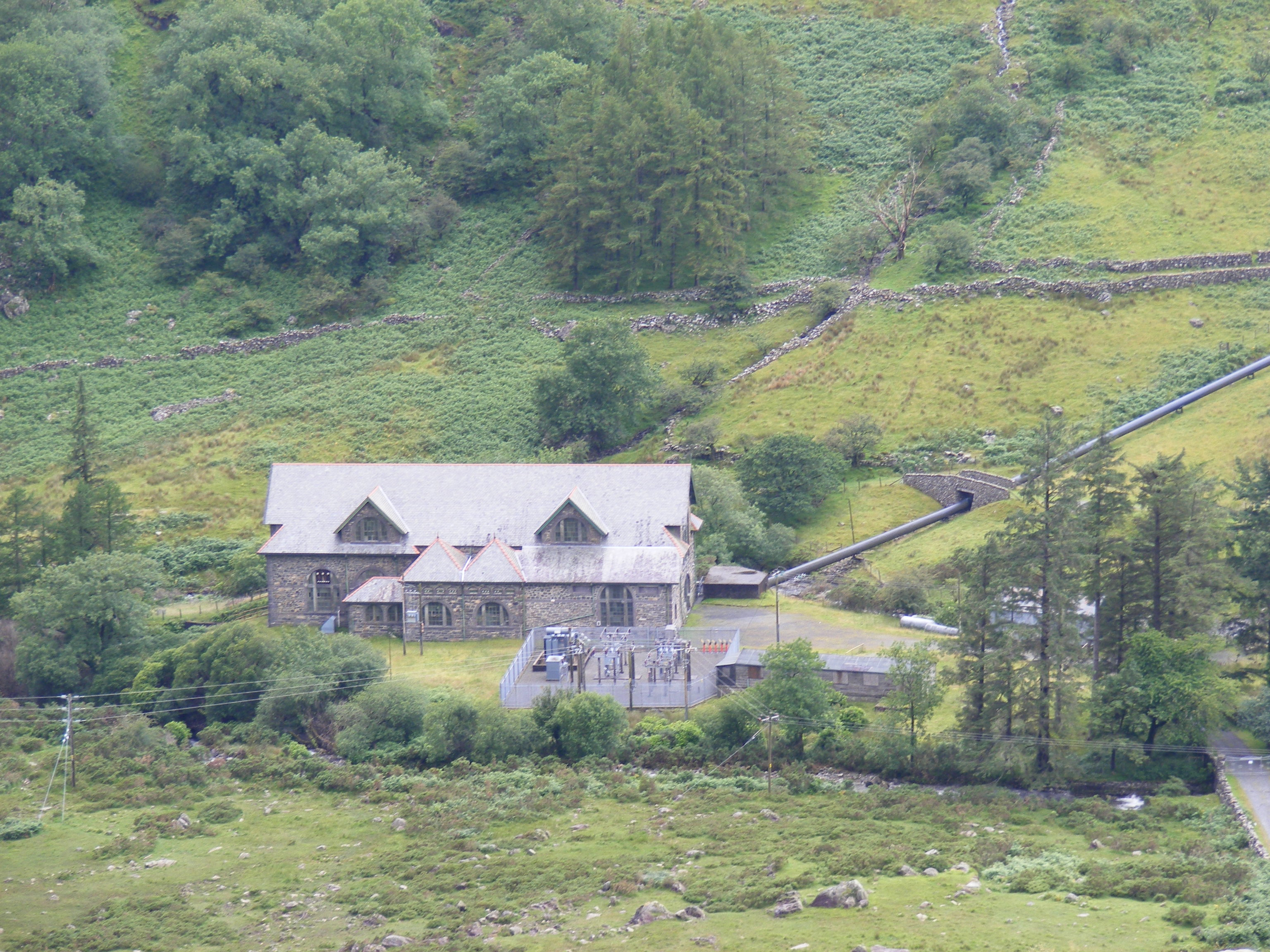
Nant Gwynant hydro-electric power station which still operates

One of the most celebrated campaigns conducted by the CPRW was against the North Wales Power Company and the British Electricity Authority. This was to be satirised by Amabel and Clough Williams-Ellis’ novel Headlong Down the Years: A tale of To-day, which parodies the style of the Regency novelist Thomas Love Peacock. The North Wales Power and Traction Company was formed in 1903. It was financed by a group of Lancashire Industrialists and initially built the small hydro-electric plant at Nant Gwynant in Snowdonia. It had authority to build and operate hydro-electric generating stations and transmission lines covering over an area of 2,100 square miles of North Wales, consisting of the whole of Carnarvonshire, Merionethshire and Anglesey and a good deal of Denbighshire. It also took over the narrow railways of the area, including the Welsh Highland Railway. In 1947 the company was Nationalised and became part of the British Electricity Authority and massive expansion plans with the construction of eight large power stations, massive reservoirs and dams, and a network of pylons to carry the electricity were promoted. The Rheidol Plant would divert water from the headwaters of the rivers Wye and Severn and plants at Maentwrog, Ffestiniog, Dolgarrog and other plants in the Conway Valley would have drained the rivers of Snowdonia dry at a time that the Snowdonia National Park was about to come into being. However, rising costs and the opposition led by the CPRW led to the schemes being deferred in November 1952, though modified schemes went ahead at Rheidol, opened in 1964, at Ffestiniog, a pumped scheme opened in 1963 and elsewhere.

=== The Conwy Bridge and Crossing ===
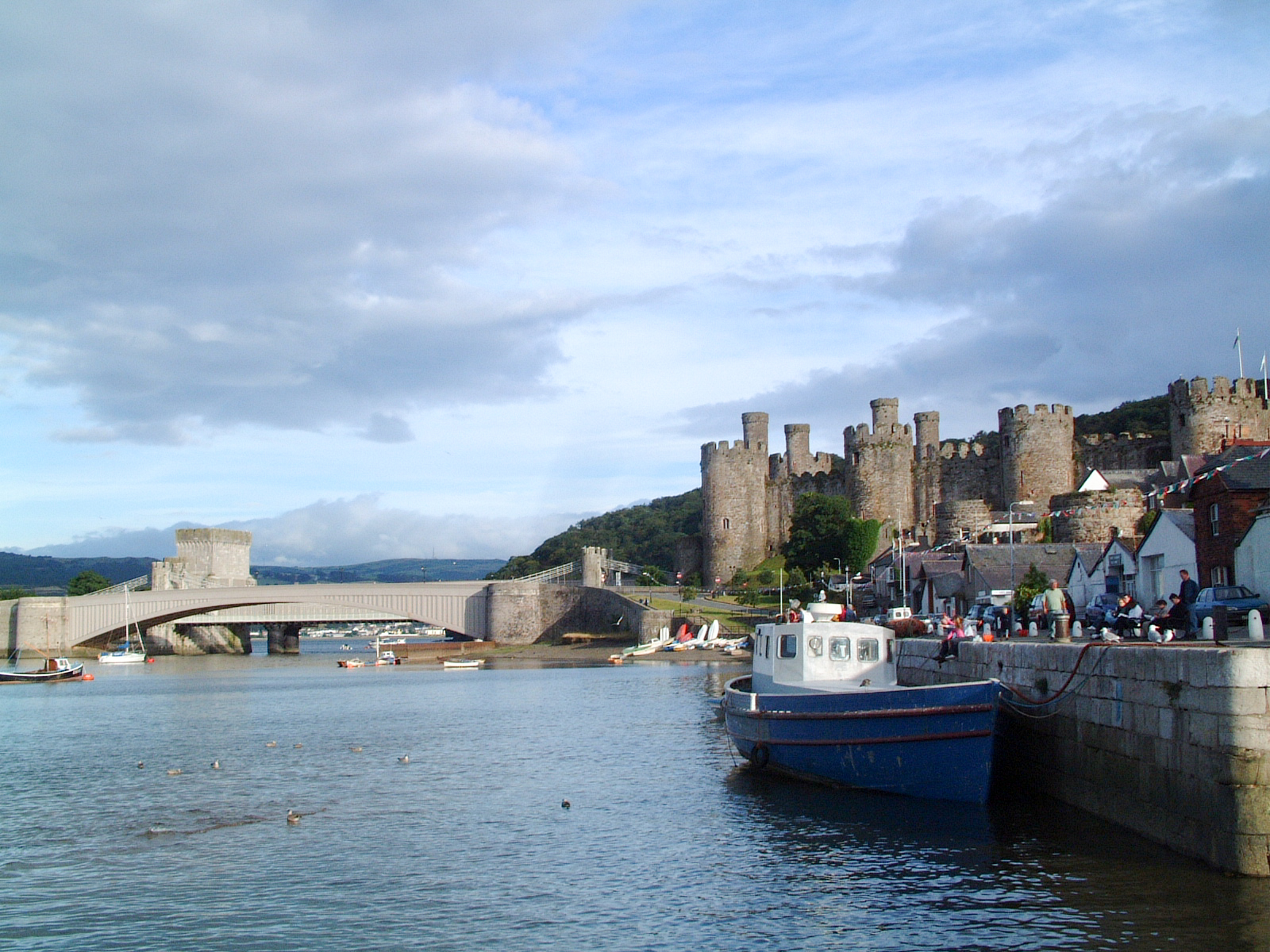
Conway Castle with the 1958 bridge in front of the other two bridges.

Proposals for the development of the road system along the North Wales Coast in the late 1930s, which would have impacted on the Town walls at Conwy resulted in an inquiry in which the CPRW and the Society of Antiquaries were represented by J. D. K. Lloyd and Alwyn Lloyd. As a result of their representations the Inspector in 1940 recommended that the route would skirt the walls, and a new bridge would be built after the War, parallel to Thomas Telford’s road bridge and Robert Stephenson’s rail bridge. The new road bridge was built in 1958. Then in 1966 the Welsh Office proposed a new high level bridge for the North Wales Expressway across the river Conwy from Deganwy. This would have had a major impact on views of Conway Castle and surrounding landscape. Following a lengthy inquiry, in which the Caernarfon Branch was represented, the suggestion made by the President Lady Eirenne White that the road should go under the Conway in a tunnel, was accepted by the Inspector, and has proved a much better solution. This quasi-motorway of 1986–93, passes under the estuary and has most successfully removed the heavy traffic from the town.

=== Pembroke Power Station and orimulsion ===
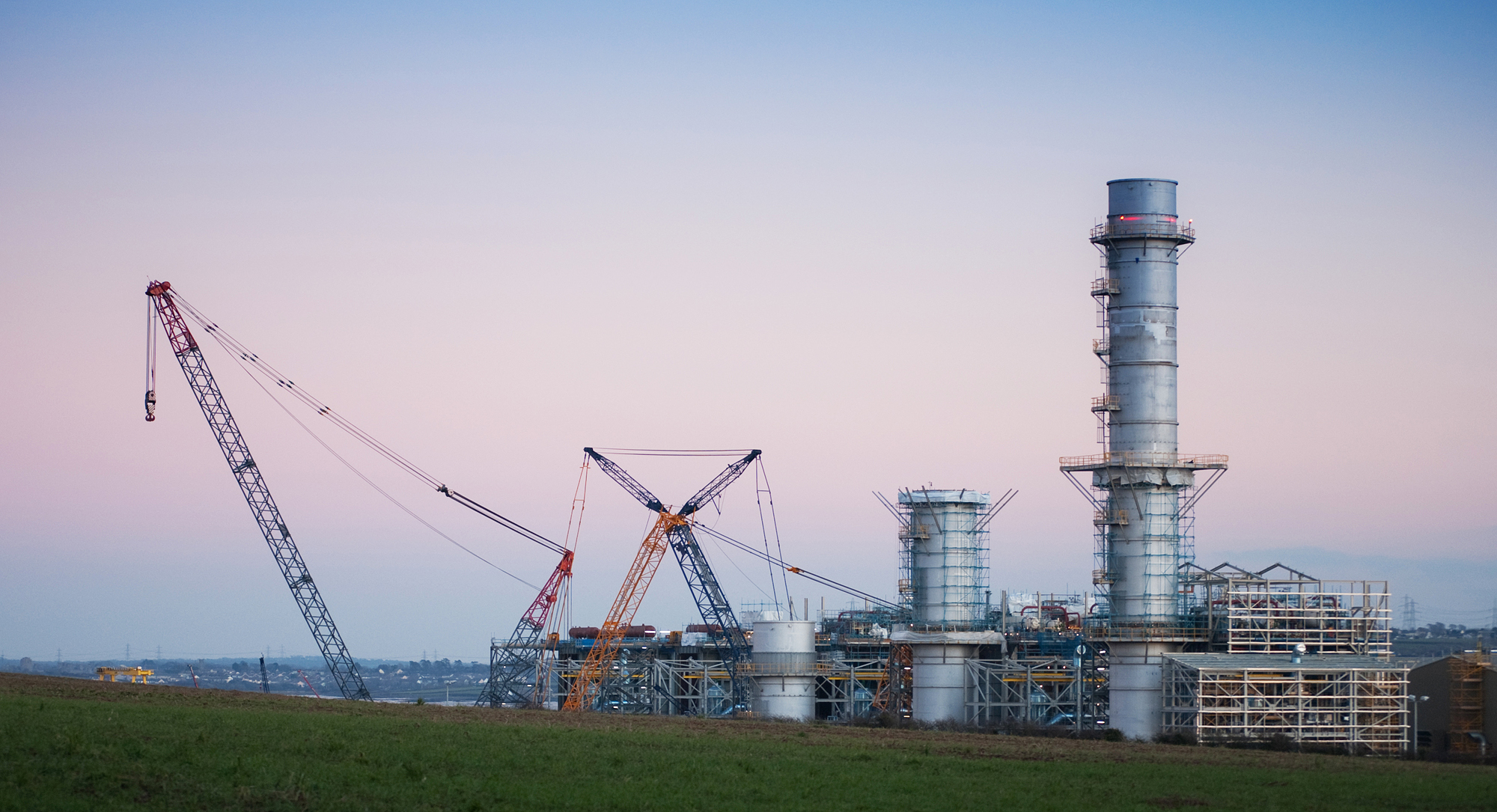
The replacement Pembroke Power Station under construction in 2011

The Pembroke Power Station was completed in 1968 for CEGB and together with Marchwood, near Southampton, was the largest oil fired power station to be built. Its maximum output was 2,000 MW and it was joined to Burry Port in Carmarthenship by two 400KVA power lines on 170 foot high pylons. It could emit 600 tons of sulphur dioxide and 3 tons of nitrogen oxides from a 500-foot chimney. The Power Station never managed to reach this maximum output. Initially it was using crude oil from the adjacent refineries but in 1992 National Power proposed changing this to orimulsion, a mixture of water and bitumen, which came from Venezuela. This would have quadrupled the potential output of sulphur dioxide as well as the possible risk of an orimulsion spill in Milford Haven. There was a local outcry when it was realised that the power station may already be causing a higher level of asthma and that there were other health risks from orimulsion. The Pembrokeshire Branch of CPRW joined with other local groups in opposing the scheme and eventually National Power suggested an additional desulphurisation plant. However, the Secretary of State decided to hold an inquiry, but a few weeks before it started National Power withdrew the proposals. The Power Station was mothballed in 1996 and demolished between 2000 and 2003. It was replaced by the Pembroke B Power Station on the same site which opened in 2012, which has turbines which run on natural gas and has a heat recovery steam generator

=== Wind farms and pylons in Mid Wales ===
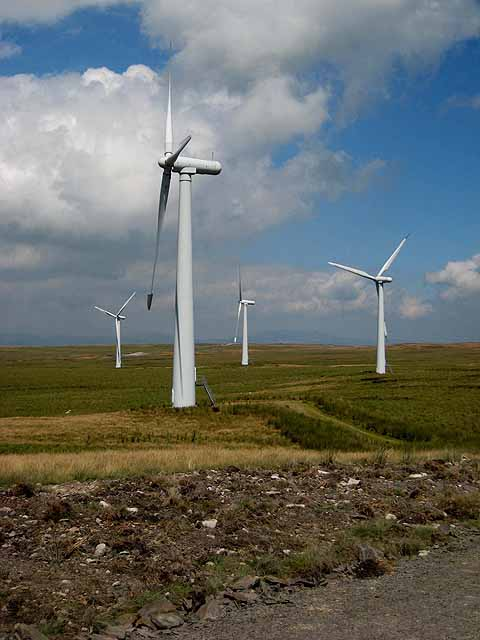
Carno Wind Farm at Twr Gwyn

The CPRW has been an active member of the Mid Wales Alliance, a group of 21 organisations opposing the plans by six energy developers for major wind farm and associated infrastructure development in the Montgomeryshire uplands. The proposed wind-farms are at Llanbadarn Fynydd, Llaithddu, Llanbrynmair, Carnedd Wen, and to re-power the Llandinam wind farm. If built, these schemes in conjunction with other consented (Tir Gwynt and Garreg Lywd), built and proposed wind farms would mean in excess of 600 wind turbines in Mid Wales and the necessity for major Grid infrastructure over large areas of the Montgomeryshire and North Shropshire countryside, as there is no further capacity to transfer energy production from the area.

The wind farms are above the 50 megawatt jurisdiction of the Welsh Assembly, and as a result plans have been dealt with by the UK government's Department of Energy and Climate Change. At Scottish Power Energy Network's (SPEN) request, National Grid started consulting on the route for 400 kV power lines and a 20-acre transformer station in 2012. There has been opposition to proposals for more wind farms and infrastructure from the majority of the local population on the grounds of its effects on the landscape, environment and tourism industry. The proposals to route pylons down either the Severn or Meifod valleys prompted the formation of MAP (Montgomeryshire Against Pylons), who joined with Conservation of Upland Powys (CUP) who had been opposing large scale proposals for over 20 years. Other local and well established groups, such as the Women's Institute and CPRW, joined forces and the Alliance was established. Local MP Glyn Davies, a past president of CPRW, had been warning for many years of the threat posed to Montgomeryshire by what he claimed was the unbalanced, poorly evidenced approach of the Welsh Government to wind farm development. Both he and Welsh AM Russell George spoke forcefully at the Public Inquiry into the five wind farms.

The CPRW launched an appeal to fund a landscape consultancy to produce the necessary evidence to help the Alliance fight these proposals. By the end of 2013 nearly £15,000 had been raised by CPRW, which, with additional support from MAP, enabled CPRW to commission Blandford's Landscape consultancy to produce evidence for the Inquiry. Peter Ogden, Director of CPRW, spoke at the Inquiry and supported the Alliance at a number of sessions. From February 2013, CPRW worked with CUP and others in the Alliance and researched, produced and presented detailed evidence. The Inquiry ended in May 2014 with the Inspector noting the undoubted strength of local opposition. He submitted his report to DECC at the end of December 2014. The Secretary of State, Amber Rudd, announced her final decision on September 7, 2015. She concluded that three of the Inspector's decisions gave insufficient weight to the landscape, residential amenity, heritage impacts he identified and concurred with the other three. This means that only Llandinam Re-powering has received consent, although it still does not have a consented route to export power.

== Regional branches ==
The CPRW is split into 14 Regional Branches. These branches organise events, lectures and comment on local matters concerning planning and the landscape. There are also two co-ordinating working groups, one for the six branches in northern Wales and another for the branches in S. E. Wales. The Regional Branches are as follows:

- Pembrokeshire
- Carmarthenshire
- West Glamorgan
- Mid & South Glamorgan
- Newport & Valleys
- Monmouthshire
- Brecon & Radnorshire
- Ceredigion
- Montgomeryshire
- Meirionnydd
- Clwyd
- Conwy
- Caernarfonshire
- Anglesey

== History ==
=== Formation ===
The formation of the Campaign for the Protection of Rural Wales (CPRW) came about largely at the instigation of the Honourable Society of Cymmrodorion, a London-based Welsh society which was founded in the 18th century. In January 1928 a provisional committee of the CPRW was set by the Cymmrodorion at a meeting held at Shrewsbury. The stimulus to form the CPRW came from the establishment of Council for the Preservation of Rural England in 1926, and the Shrewsbury meeting was followed by a meeting in May in London at the Royal Society of Arts. This meeting was addressed by Lord Crawford and Balcarres, the first President of the CPRE. The founding figures at the Shrewsbury Meeting included Miss Gwendoline Davies of Gregynog Hall, Sir E. Vincent Evans and Dr. Thomas Jones, of the Cymmrodorion, Dr Willoughby Gardner of the Cambrian Archaeological Association, Sir Patrick Abercrombie, a founding figure of CPRE, Cyril Fox, the recently appointed Director of the National Museum of Wales, T. Alwyn Lloyd, the noted Welsh architect and planner; and Clough Williams-Ellis.

=== 1930's ===
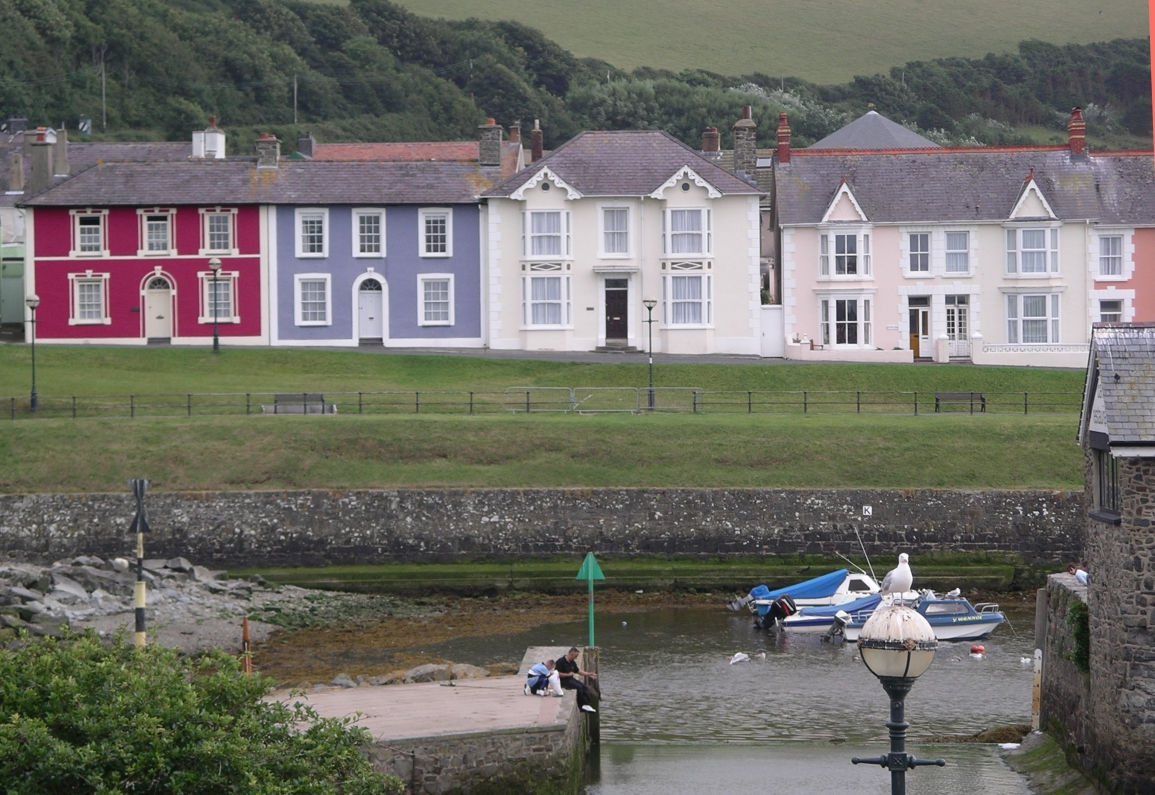
Aberaeron- an example of colour-washed houses

Meetings of the council and later the executive committee took place in London and office space for the CPRW was provided by the Cymmrodorion. District Committees started to be established in the Welsh counties from 1928. Matters which occupied CPRW were subjects such as Ribbon development, the design of rural buildings, indiscriminate felling of trees and unregulated advertising. Most of these matters were to come under the powers granted to County Councils when the first Town and Country Planning Act was passed in 1947. CPRW supported the idea of National Parks and forwarded evidence to the Addison Report, published in 1931. The CPRW also supported the idea of colour washing of Welsh housing, which can best be seen to-day at Aberaeron, as a result of the influence of Clough Williams Ellis. The conflict between the demands of re-armament in the pre-War period and the need for airfields, bombing ranges and training areas posed a particular problem for CPRW. Their objections to the bombing range at Porth Neigl on the Llŷn Peninsula led to modifications, but in the case of the acquisition of the Stackpole Estate and the development of the Castle Martin firing range, the CPRW was forced to acquiesce in the national interest. During the 2nd World War the CPRW very largely ceased to exist, but was revived in 1946.

== Office Holders ==
=== Presidents ===
- 1928-31 Lord Boston
- 1931-1945 Lord Howard de Walden
- 1948-1965 Lady Megan Lloyd George
- 1966 Sir Clough Williams Ellis
- 1968-73 Wynford Vaughan-Thomas
- 1973-1987 Lady Eirenne White
- 1987-1995 Lord Williams of Elvel
- 1995-2001 John Elfed Jones
- 2002 Vacant
- 2003- Michael Griffith
- -2010 Glyn Davies
- 2010- Vacant
- 2014 Jules Hudson
- 2020- vacant

=== Chairmen ===
- 1928 Lord Boston
- 1929-46 Clough Williams-Ellis
- 1946-60 T Alwyn Lloyd
- 1964-68 Dr Jenkin Alban Davies
- 1968-73 Capt. H R N Vaughan
- 1973-75 Wynford Vaughan-Thomas
- 1975-82 C W Grove-White
- 1982-85 M W D Brace
- 1985-88 W D Harries- Baker
- 1988-93 Dorothea Garnons-Williams
- 1993-97 Dei Tomos
- 2001- Morlais Owen
- 2014-2017 Dr J Rosenfeld
- 2017- 2020 Peter Alexander-Fitzgerald LLB LLM
- 2020- Jonathan Colchester

=== General Secretaries, Directors and CEO's ===
- 1930-40 J D K Lloyd
- 1940-47 H G Griffin
- 1947-49 Humphrey ap Evans
- 1949-61 Sir H G Griffin
- 1961-63 Major General Lewis Pugh
- 1963-88 Simon Meade
- 1988-93 Dr Neil Caldwell
- 1993-2003 Merfyn Williams
- 2003-2017 Peter Ogden
- 2020- Jon Parker

== See also ==
- Campaign to Protect Rural England (CPRE)
- Civic Trust for Wales
