= Andrea Foulkes =

British past life regression therapist

- Born: Stoke-on-Trent
- Presenting career
- Show: Have I Been Here Before?
- Network: ITV
- Country: UK

Andrea Foulkes is a British past life regression therapist who is a co-host of Have I Been Here Before?, an ITV daytime television show. In the show celebrities are led by Foulkes to re-experience their past lives.

She was born in Stoke-on-Trent and grew up in Hough. She worked at a salon in Nantwich, before becoming a fashion model, and living in Milan and then London. She modelled frequently on the shopping channel QVC and appeared in numerous commercials.

After attending mediumistic sessions, she claims to have discovered her intuitive and healing abilities. She was violently mugged outside her flat, and later said this experience was a trigger that caused her to give up modelling and focus on the 'inner world' of spirituality. In 2003 she appeared on Kilroy to speak about her experiences.

She appeared on the television show This Morning for a year before the start of Have I Been here Before? Celebrities such as John Barrowman, David Seaman, and Jennie Bond appeared on the show, and Foulkes told them they had lived previous lives as a circus clown, Richard the Lionheart, and a destitute girl.

On 22 September 2009, she founded the 'World Peace Meditation Day', and was given an award by the Women's Federation for World Peace.

.
