= Garreg Lwyd =

Garreg Lwyd may refer to:

- Garreg Lwyd (Black Mountain), a peak in the Black Mountains of South Wales
- Garreg Lwyd (Rhayader), a hill near Rhayader in Mid Wales
- Garreg Lwyd, a small estate on the outskirts of Gwyddelwern, North Wales
