= Cyncoed Methodist Church =

Church in Cardiff, Wales

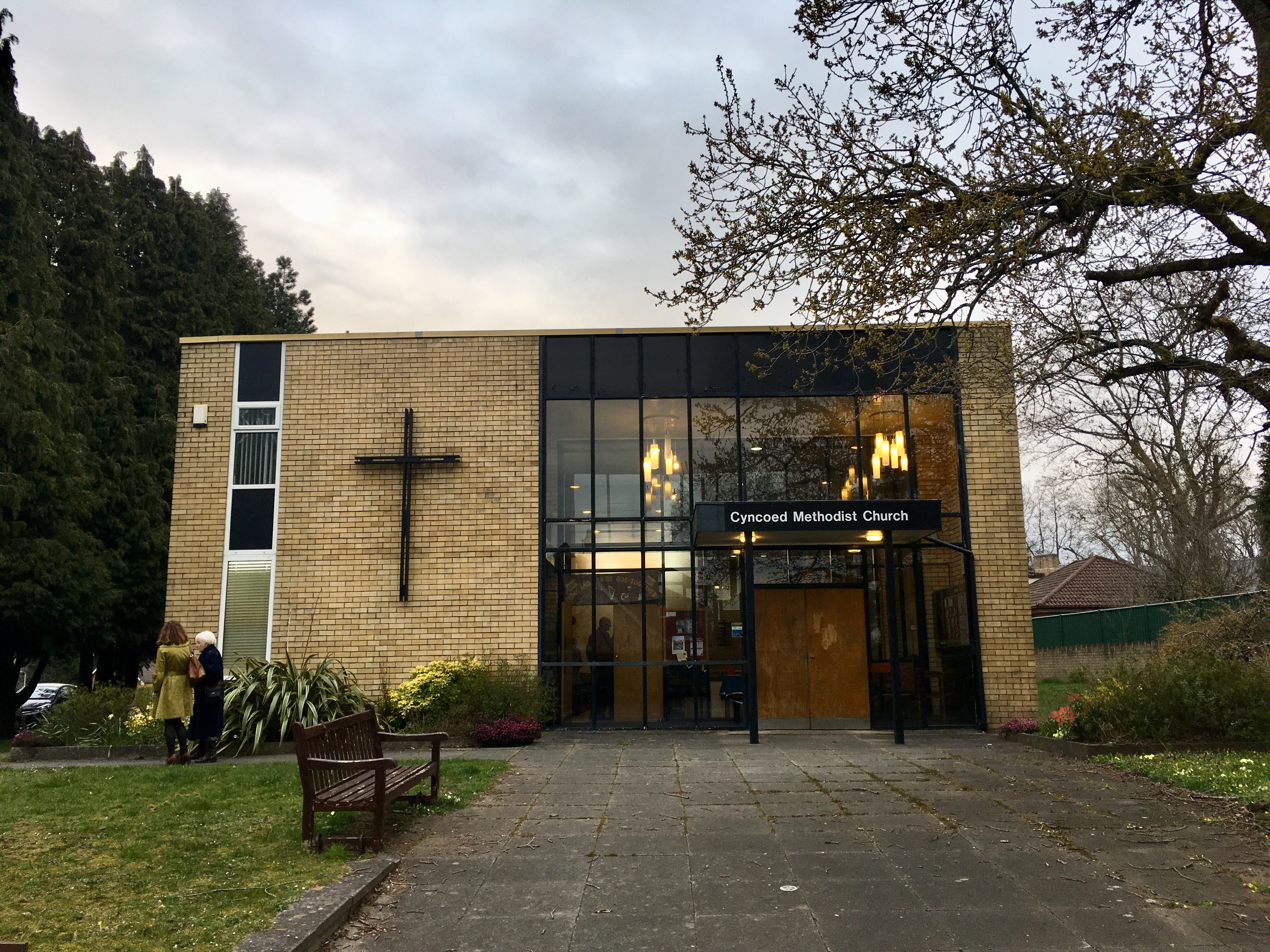
- Cyncoed Methodist Church
- 51.5227°N 3.1645°W
- Denomination: Methodist
- Website: cyncoedmethodistchurch.co.uk

History
- Dedicated: 24 September 1966

Architecture
- Functional status: Active
- Heritage designation: Grade II
- Designated: 30 November 2001
- Architect: Alex Gordon

Cyncoed Methodist Church is a listed place of worship in the suburb of Cyncoed in Cardiff, Wales. Organisationally, it is in the East cluster of the Cardiff Methodist Circuit.

The church was built in 1966 and was designed by Alex Gordon, who was to become a prominent architect in south Wales. The building is in the International Modern style that was pioneered by Mies van der Rohe, and is a rectilinear design in glass and buff-coloured brick. The foundation stone was laid on 20 November 1965, and the church was dedicated the following September. A large extension was built to the rear of the church in 1992. The church gained listed status in 2001, with the listing giving as a reason: As an individually accomplished design, Cyncoed Methodist Church helps to define the architectural standard for post-war religious buildings in Wales.
