= Herbert Jackson (architect) =

British architect and town planner

- Born: 25 June 1909
- Died: 1989 (age 89-90); Warwickshire, England
- Occupation: Architect
- Spouse: Margaret Elizabeth Pearson (m. 1930)
- Awards: Saxon Snell Prize (1931)

Herbert Jackson FRIBA FRTPI (25 June 1909 – 1989), known as "Jacko", was a British architect and town planner, active in Birmingham and the Black Country, England, during and after World War II. He worked in the practice of Jackson & Edmonds, and sometimes partnership with Thomas Alwyn Lloyd.

Jackson was born in 1909, the son of John Herbert Jackson. He was educated at Handsworth Grammar School and Birmingham School of Architecture. He was awarded the Saxon Snell Prize in 1931, the same year he went into private practise.

With Patrick Abercrombie, in 1948 he authored The West Midlands Plan and the North Staffordshire Plan, each commissioned by the Minister for Town and Country Planning. He was President of the Royal Birmingham Society of Artists (RBSA) from 1960–1962.

In 1955, his address was given as 25 Augustus Road, Edgbaston, Birmingham.

His portrait was sketched in 1947 by the artist Bernard Fleetwood-Walker, an earlier RBSA President, whose son, Guy, worked for Jackson & Edmonds.

== Publications ==
- Lloyd, Thomas Alwyn; Jackson, Herbert (1943). Brierley Hill: Town planning and post-war reconstruction. Brierley Hill Urban District Council. 8pp
- Lloyd, Thomas Alwyn; Jackson, Herbert (1944). Town planning and post-war reconstruction: report. Dudley County Borough Council.
- Lloyd, Thomas Alwyn; Jackson, Herbert (1945). Town planning and post-war development, a report prepared by the Council's town planning consultants in collaboration with the Borough Engineer and Surveyor [G.N. Maynard]. (Stourbridge; 1945), 12pp, 1s. Report accepted by Council 30 July 1945
- Lloyd, Thomas Alwyn; Jackson, Herbert (1949). South Wales Outline Plan: for the South Wales & Monmouthshire development area (excluding the Borough of Pembroke). HMSO., prepared in 1947 for the Minister of Town & Country Planning.
