= Have I Been Here Before? =

- Genre: Reality
- Directed by: Ben Warwick
- Presented by: Phillip Schofield
- Starring: Andrea Foulkes; Jules Hudson
- Country of origin: United Kingdom
- Original language: English
- No. of series: 2
- No. of episodes: 33

Production
- Executive producer: Shu Richmond
- Producer: Nicola Pointer
- Camera setup: Multi-camera
- Running time: 22 minutes
- Production company: ITV Productions

Original release
- Network: ITV
- Release: 16 May 2005 – 30 August 2007

Have I Been Here Before? is an ITV daytime programme, presented by Phillip Schofield, made by ITV Productions. The programme offers celebrity guests the chance to see if they have lived before, in a past life. The celebrities are regressed by experienced therapist Andrea Foulkes, and in the process they often reveal some deeply intimate thoughts about their current lives.

Jules Hudson, a qualified historian and archaeologist, investigates the historical accuracy of the regression, to establish any credibility for the past life recounted.

Phillip Schofield then reveals the results of the investigation to the celebrity, and discusses any effects they feel the experience has had on their life.

== Episodes ==
Series	Episodes	Originally released	
Series	Episodes	First released	Last released
1	20	16 May 2005	10 June 2005
2	13	13 August 2007	30 August 2007

=== Series 1 (2005) ===
No. overall	No. in series	Celebrity	Former life	Original airdate
1	1	Neil Fox	A lute-playing carpenter	16 May 2005
2	2	Anneka Rice	A 16-year-old stowaway	17 May 2005
3	3	Jane McDonald	A dancer in an Arabian palace	18 May 2005
4	4	Linda Lusardi	A 14th-century peasant	19 May 2005
5	5	Lisa I'Anson	An Italian monk	20 May 2005
6	6	Jonathan Coleman	An 18th-century sailor	23 May 2005
7	7	Jennie Bond	An 18th-century destitute girl	24 May 2005
8	8	Joe Pasquale	A soldier in World War I	25 May 2005
9	9	Nicola Wheeler	A soldier in 1804	26 May 2005
10	10	Toyah Willcox	An anchoress in 15th-century Holland	27 May 2005
11	11	Cheryl Baker	A 19th-century carpenter	30 May 2005
12	12	Ann Maurice	A Roman Centurion	1 June 2005
13	13	Melinda Messenger	A weeping old woman	1 June 2005
14	14	Anne Charleston	A poor Irish farm girl	2 June 2005
15	15	Coleen Nolan	A nervous 16-year-old debutante	3 June 2005
16	16	Sarah Greene	A young girl, who is forced into slave labour	6 June 2005
17	17	Shaun Williamson	A 14th-century knight	7 June 2005
18	18	Denise Welch	A farm girl living in Devon	8 June 2005
19	19	Tina Baker	An elegant Victorian woman	9 June 2005
20	20	Suzanne Shaw	A frail girl, living in the shadow of her sister	10 June 2005

=== Series 2 (2007) ===
No. overall	No. in series	Celebrity	Former life	Original airdate
21	1	Kym Ryder	A maid for Mr Brown who had his baby and married his son	13 August 2007
22	2	Hannah Waterman	A 19-year-old girl who later on moved to India and had many lovers	14 August 2007
23	3	John Barrowman	A 19th-century circus clown	15 August 2007
24	4	Gaynor Faye	A woman from a wealthy family and couldn't marry the man she truly loved	16 August 2007
25	5	Samantha Giles	A housekeeper	17 August 2007
26	6	Eddie Large	An 18th-century Jacobite named Jock Campbell	20 August 2007
27	7	Alison Lapper	When she was 17 she was taken away by a cruel Lord	21 August 2007
28	8	David Seaman	A 28-year-old who lived in a castle in Windsor, and was apparently Richard the Lionheart.	22 August 2007
29	9	Adele Silva	A 6-year-old male orphan	23 August 2007
30	10	Sally James	A 9-year-old boy named Joe, who lived with his parents in a back-to-back house	24 August 2007
31	11	Charles Ingram	A woman, named Claudia Servina who lived in Britain in the Roman period of 60 AD	28 August 2007
32	12	Kerry Katona	Sarah who was seventeen with twin brothers William and John, both five	29 August 2007
33	13	Katherine Jenkins	Ran a vegetable farm with her husband	30 August 2007
