= Thomas Alwyn Lloyd =

Welsh architect and town planner

- Born: 11 August 1881; Liverpool, England
- Died: 19 June 1960 (aged 78); Torquay, England
- Citizenship: British
- Education: Liverpool University School of Architecture
- Occupations: Architect, town planner

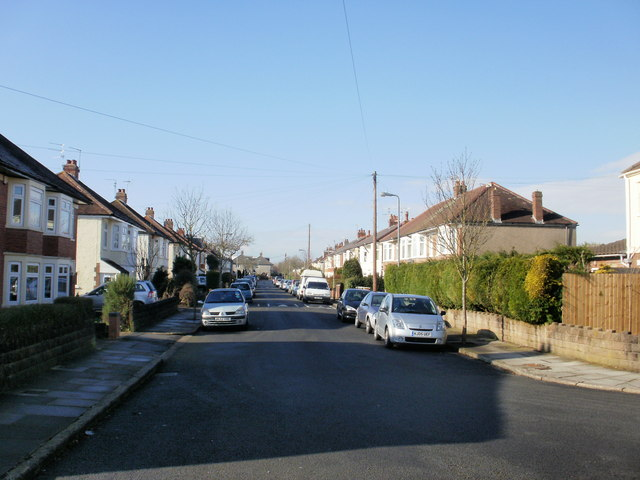
Waun-y-Groes Avenue, Rhiwbina Garden Village, Cardiff, largely designed by Alwyn Lloyd

Thomas Alwyn Lloyd OBE (11 August 1881 – 19 June 1960), known as T. Alwyn Lloyd, was a Welsh architect and town planner. He was one of the founders of the Town Planning Institute in 1914 and its president in 1933. He was also a founding member of the Council for the Protection of Rural Wales in 1928 and served as its chairman from 1947 to 1959. Meic Stephens described Lloyd's work as follows:

Lloyd's small-scale buildings reflected his deep feeling for place, in both historical and environmental terms, as in the Garden Villages for which he was responsible in various parts of Wales.

== Life and career ==
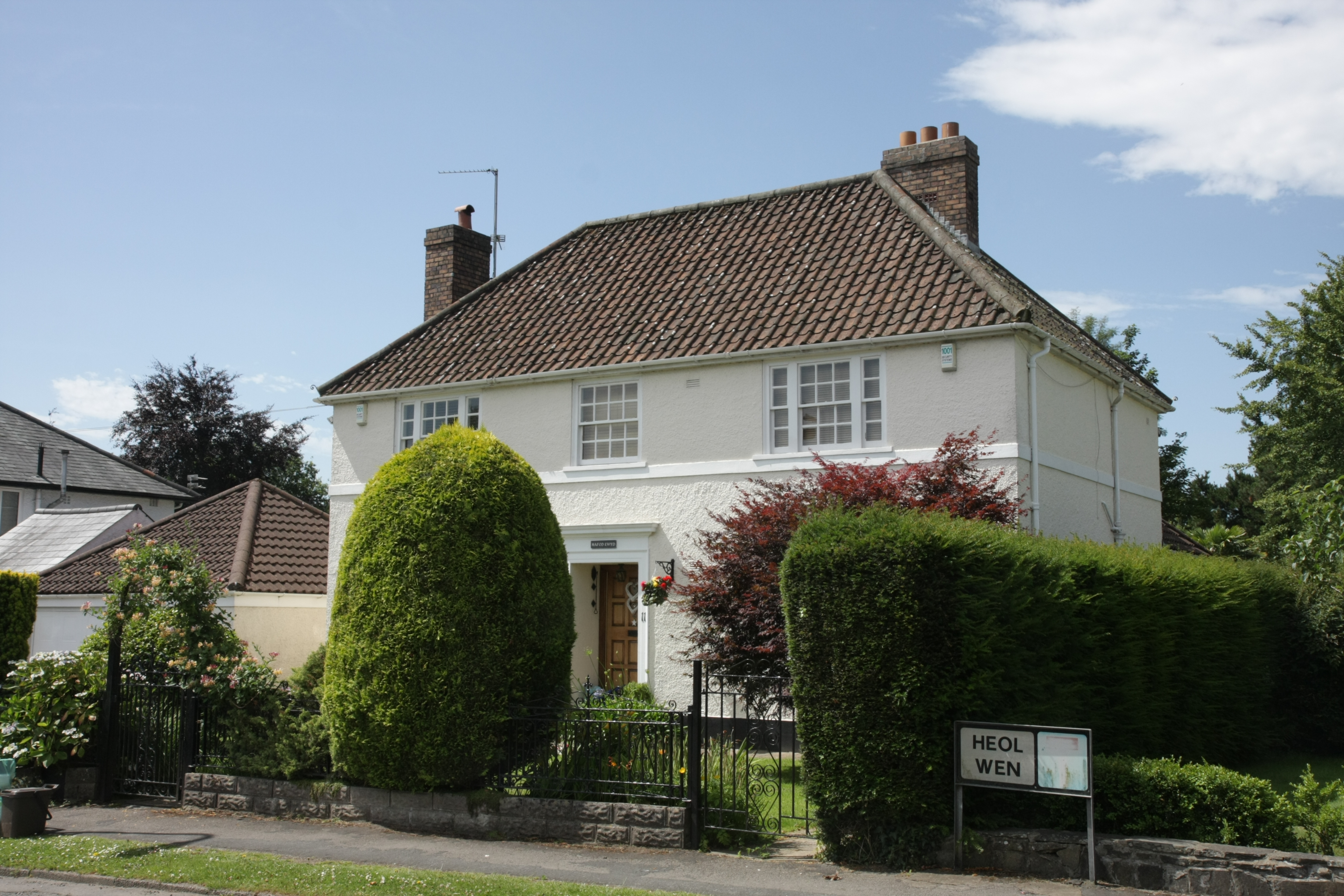
Hafod Lwyd, Rhiwbina Garden Village. Designed by Alwyn Lloyd for his own occupation c. 1920

Thomas Alwyn Lloyd was born in Liverpool, the son of Thomas and Elizabeth Jones Lloyd, from Denbighshire. He was educated at Liverpool College and studied and Liverpool School of Architecture in the University of Liverpool. Between 1907 and 1912 he was an assistant to Sir Raymond Unwin in the Hampstead Garden Suburb. In 1913 he was appointed consulting architect to the Welsh Town Planning and Housing Trust. He also undertook work for the National Coal Board and Forestry Commission in Wales. In 1948 he entered into partnership with Alex Gordon forming T. Alwyn Lloyd and Gordon..

He married Charlotte Ethel Robarts in 1914.

In about 1920 he designed his own home at 11 Heol Wen in Rhiwbina Garden Village, in northern Cardiff. It has been a Grade II listed building since 2001.

He died on holiday in Torquay on 19 June 1960.

== Buildings and urban planning ==
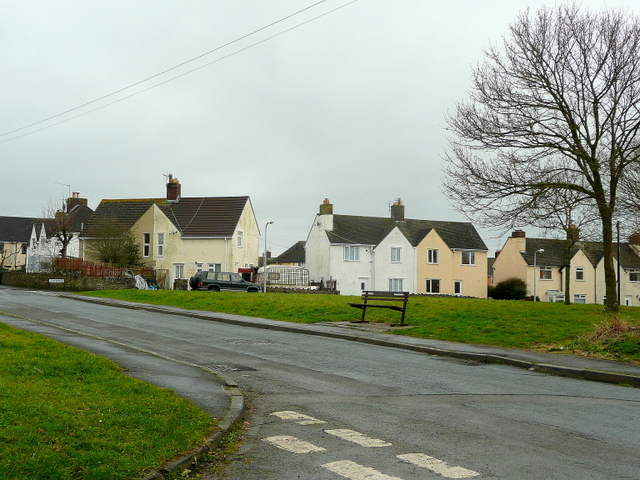
Housing at Trebeferad (1936)

- 1913 Machynlleth Garden Village, Powys. Thirteen terraced houses.
- 1913–1914 Wrexham Garden Village, 205 houses.
- c. 1914 Llanidloes garden suburb, Powys
- 1915–c. 1925 Barry Garden Suburb, Vale of Glamorgan
- 1920–1923 Rhiwbina Garden Village, Cardiff
- 1922 Village Hall, Llanfair Caereinion, Powys
- c. 1920 Hafod Lwyd, 11 Heol Wen, Rhiwbina Garden Village. A house for Lloyd's own occupation.
- c. 1926 St. Francis-on-the-Hill Chapel, Barry, Vale of Glamorgan. (Now the St. Francis Millennium Centre)

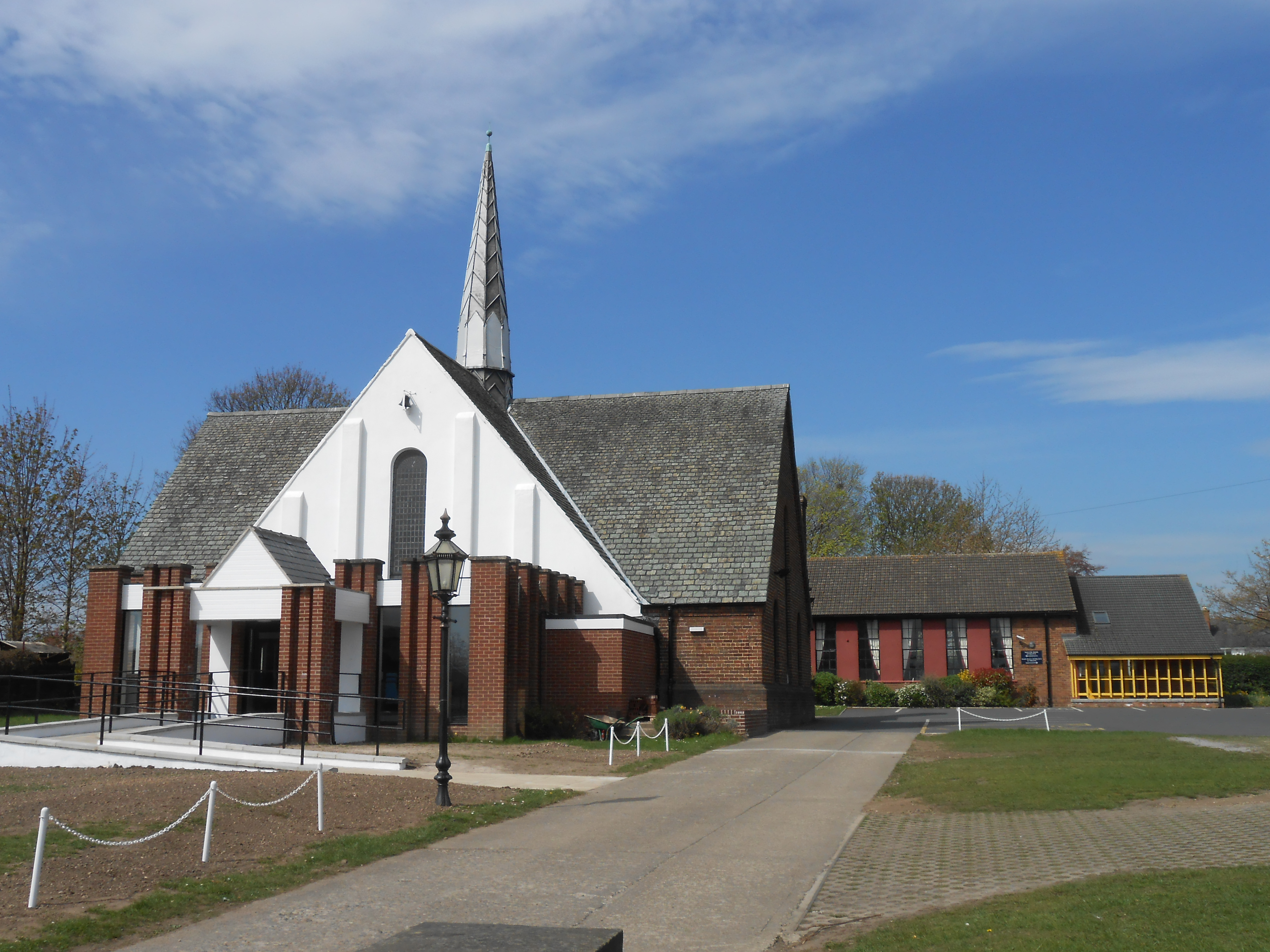
St Margaret's Church, Wrexham Garden Village (1960)

- 1930 University of Wales Registry extension, Cathays Park, Cardiff
- 1936 Trebeferad Land Settlement Scheme, Boverton, Llantwit Major, Vale of Glamorgan. Housing intended to be a new village for miners resettled from the South Wales Coalfield.
- 1936 Fferm Goch, Penllyn, Vale of Glamorgan. 34 Semi-detached houses for unemployed miners.
- 1951 Llwynygog Forest Village, Staylittle, Hafren Forest, Powys. Housing for Forestry Commission workers.
- 1949–50 Turner House Art Gallery, Penarth, Vale of Glamorgan. Remodelling
- 1960 St Margaret's Church, Wrexham Garden Village
- 1960 Ystrad Mynach College of Further Education

Dates unknown:

- Fishguard, Pembrokeshire – new village design
- Menai Bridge, Anglesey – new village design
- Llangefni, Anglesey – new village design
- Students' Union Building, Cardiff (Not the current Students' Union building, which was built in 1973)

== Public appointments ==
- South Wales Institute of Architects, president (1929–31)
- National Housing and Town Planning Council, president (1933–35)
- Minister of Health's Advisory Committee on Town and Country Planning (1933–40)
- Lord Reith's Consultative Panel on Reconstruction (1941–42)
- Central Advisory Committee on Education (Wales) (1945–48)
- Council for the Protection of Rural Wales, chairman (1947–1959)
- Royal Commission on Ancient Monuments (Wales), commissioner (1949–60)
- Cambrian Archaeological Association, chairman of general committee (1951–54), president (1958–59)
- Postmaster General's Welsh Stamp Committee (1957–58)
- Discharge of Prisoners Aid Society, chairman of Cardiff branch
- Magistrate

== Awards ==
- Honorary LL.D., University of Wales (1950)
- Fellow of the Society of Antiquaries (1953)
- OBE (1958)

== Commemorations ==
=== T Alwyn Lloyd memorial gold medal for architecture ===
Awarded at the Welsh National Eisteddfod for a building that cost less than £750,000, and has been completed in the past three years. Endowed by Lloyd in 1954.

=== T Alwyn Lloyd memorial travelling scholarships ===
Awarded by the Welsh School of Architecture to the top four students in the final year of the Part 1.

=== T Alwyn Lloyd memorial prize ===
Awarded by the Welsh School of Architecture for the best overall performance in the 2 MArch examination.

== Select Writings ==
- Lloyd, T. Alwyn Brighter Welsh villages and how we can achieve them CPRW, (1931)
- Lloyd, T. Alwyn Town and Country Planning. Routledge (1935)
- Lloyd, T. Alwyn. with Herbert Jackson, South Wales Outline Plan HMSO (1947)
- Lloyd, T. Alwyn Welsh Town Planning and Housing Trust and Its Affiliated Societies The Town Planning Review Vol. 23, No. 1 (Apr. 1952), pp. 40–51.
- Lloyd, T. Alwyn Safeguarding the Beauty of Wales:Being a short address Broadcast from Cardiff BBC station on St David's Day, 1933. Reprinted by the CPRW Welshpool, 2008.
