= Alex Gordon (architect) =

Welsh architect (1917–1999)

Sir Alex Gordon
- Born: Alexander John Gordon; 25 February 1917; Ayr, Scotland, UK
- Died: 12 July 1999 (aged 82); St Hilary, Vale of Glamorgan, Wales, UK
- Occupation: Architect
- Practice: Alex Gordon & Partners
- Buildings: Crown Building 2, Cardiff; Cardiff University School of Music; Cardiff University Students' Union; Swansea Crown Court

Sir Alexander John Gordon, CBE (25 February 1917 – 12 July 1999) was a Welsh architect. Born in Ayr, Scotland, he was brought up and educated in Swansea and Cardiff. After World War II he designed several major buildings in Cardiff and Swansea, and from 1971 to 1973 he served as president of the Royal Institute of British Architects. In 1974 he summarised the needs of new architecture as 'Long life, loose fit, low energy'.

== Biography ==
Gordon was born in Ayr, Scotland, the son of John Tullis Gordon (b. 1884), a telegraph engineer, and Euphemia Baxter Borrowman Gordon, née Simpson (1890–1942). In 1925 the family moved to Swansea.

Gordon attended Swansea Grammar School, where his contemporaries included the poet Dylan Thomas, with whom he produced the school magazine, the composer Daniel Jones and the art critic Mervyn Levy. He lived in South Wales for the rest of his life, for many years at Llanblethian in the Vale of Glamorgan.

He was an enthusiastic art collector, and bequeathed 32 paintings to the Glynn Vivian Art Gallery, Swansea, including works by Marc Chagall, Augustus John, Kyffin Williams, Barbara Hepworth, Ben Nicholson and Elisabeth Frink and a portrait bust of himself by Ivor Roberts-Jones.

He retired in 1982, but retained a consultative role until 1988.

He died in St Hilary, Vale of Glamorgan on 23 July 1999. He was unmarried.

== Training ==
Gordon became a trainee architect in the Swansea Borough Architect's Department in 1935, and studied part-time for the RIBA intermediate examination, which he passed before the outbreak of the Second World War. In 1936, while a trainee, he won the Lord Mayor of Cardiff's competition for the design of street decorations to celebrate the coronation. During World War II he served as a major in the Royal Engineers, serving in Palestine where he worked on large-scale construction projects. After leaving the Army, he studied at the Welsh School of Architecture in Cardiff, and was awarded a diploma with special distinction in 1948.

== Professional life ==
In 1949 Gordon entered into partnership with Thomas Alwyn Lloyd (1881–1960), forming T. Alwyn Lloyd and Gordon. Initially the practice worked on public housing and housing for the Forestry Commission.

In 1949 he was appointed consultant architect to the Wales Gas Board, for which he designed a new headquarters, Snelling House, Cardiff (1966). This eight-story office block was the first of many large buildings that he designed.

After Alwyn Lloyd's death in 1960, Gordon established Alex Gordon and Partners with Alun Roberts and David Humphreys. The business expanded, and had ten partners by 1972.

Gordon was visiting professor at the Bartlett School of Architecture, University College London

Gordon was elected president of the South Wales Institute of Architects in 1967. He was active in the RIBA and served as its president from 1971 to 1973.

=== Long life, loose fit, low energy ===
In 1974 he wrote a paper for the RIBA on the future shape of architecture, in which he argued that buildings should be designed for Long life, loose fit, low energy. This phrase has since become widely used by architectural practices.

=== Selected works ===
- 1955 University Sports Pavilion, Cardiff (Awarded RIBA Bronze Medal)
- 1966 Cyncoed Methodist Church, Cardiff (Grade II listed building)
- 1966 Snelling House, Cardiff. Headquarters of Wales Gas, now the Big Sleep hotel.
- Mid-1960s Staff housing Atlantic College, St Donats
- 1967 Cement and Concrete Association Training Centre, Fulmer Grange, Slough
- 1968 Churchill House, Cardiff
- 1970 Telephone Exchange Building, Swansea
- 1970 Cardiff University School of Music
- 1971 Sherman Theatre, Cardiff
- 1972 Mathematics Building, Cardiff University
- 1973 Students' Union Building, Cardiff University
- 1978 Transport House, Transport and General Workers' Union building, Cardiff
- 1979 Welsh Office, Cathays Park, Cardiff, now known as Crown Building 2
- 1981 Princess of Wales Hospital, Bridgend
- 1988 Swansea Crown Court
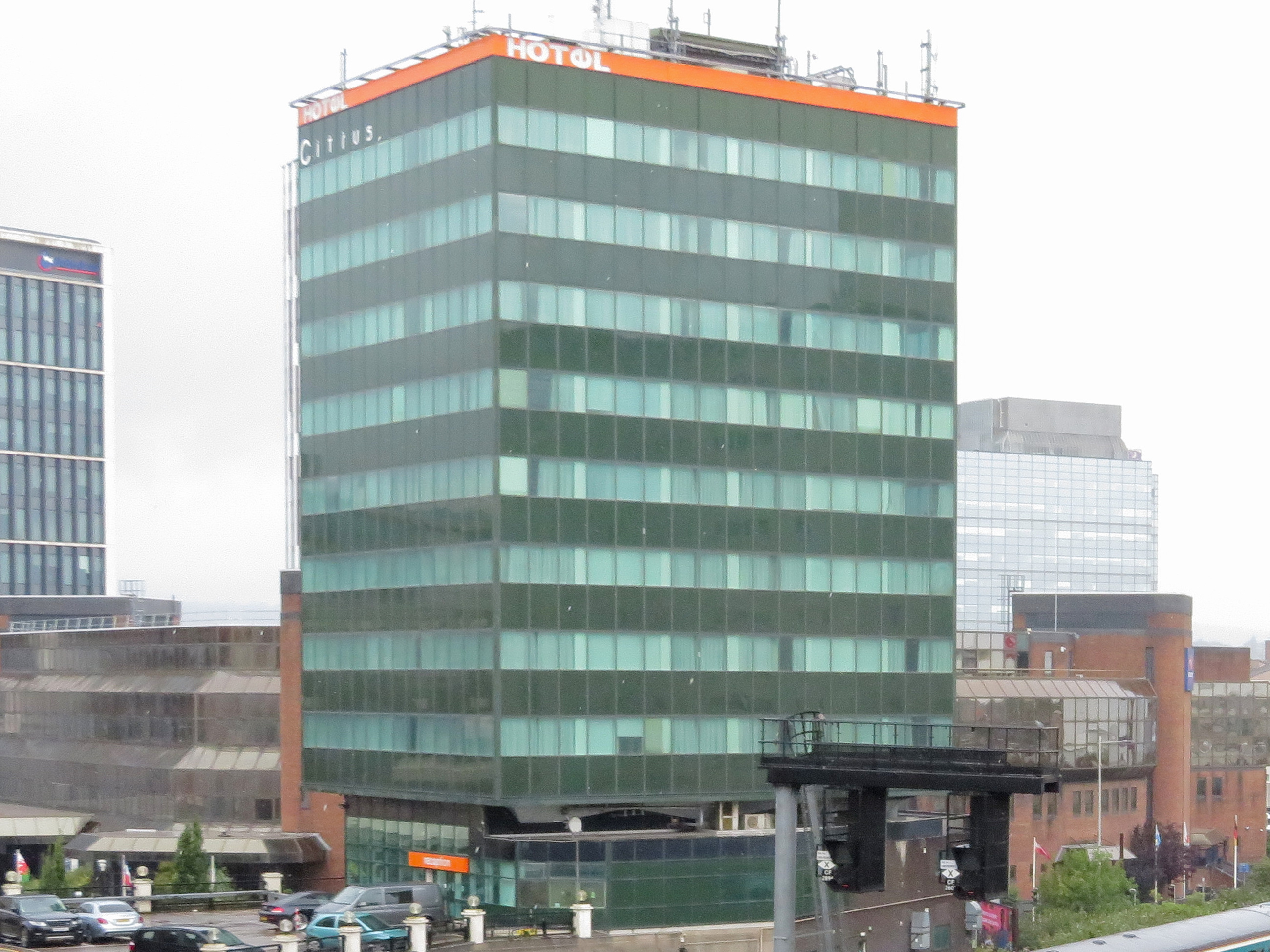
Snelling House, Cardiff (1966)
(now the Citrus Hotel)

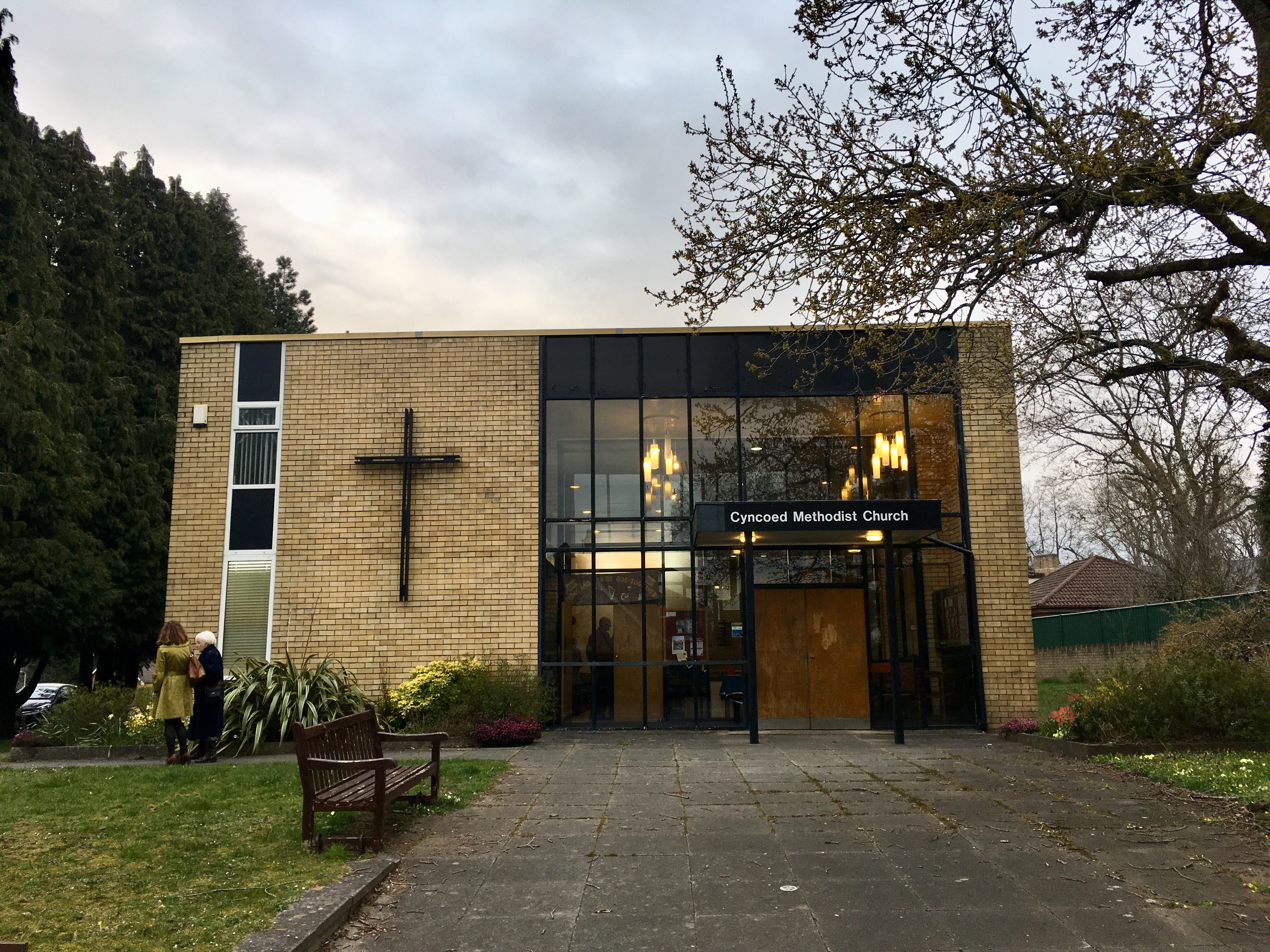
Cyncoed Methodist Church, Cardiff (1966)

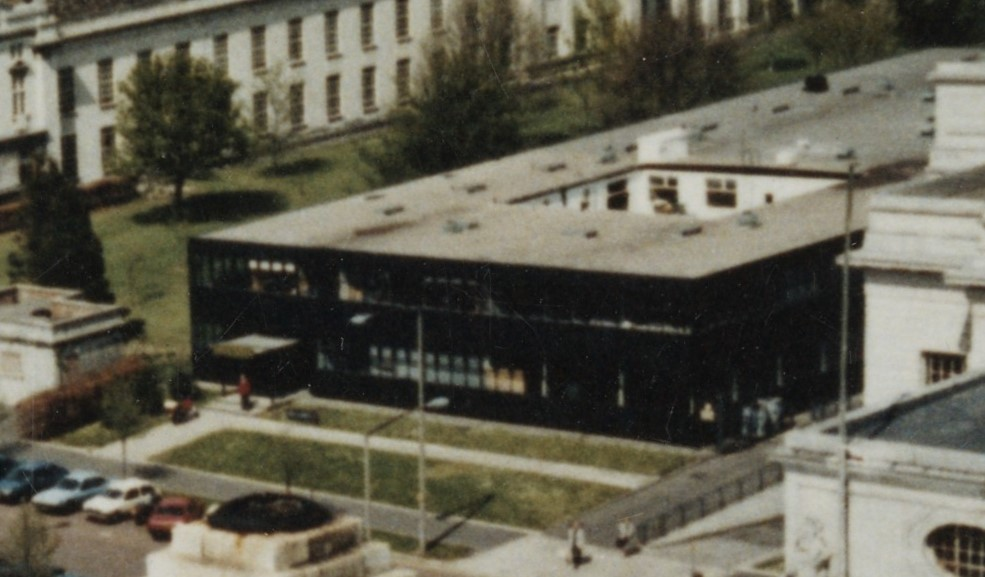
Black Box, Cathay Park, Cardiff
(1966, demolished 1992)

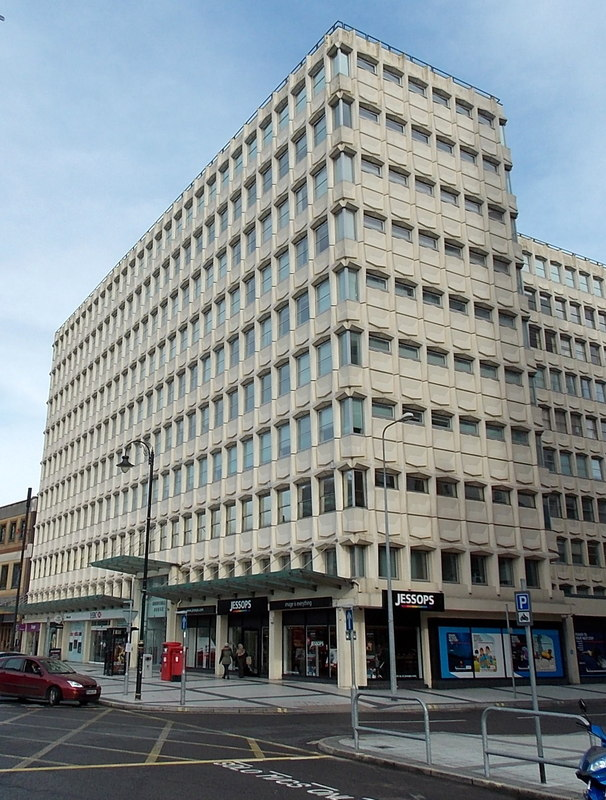
Churchill House, Cardiff (1968)

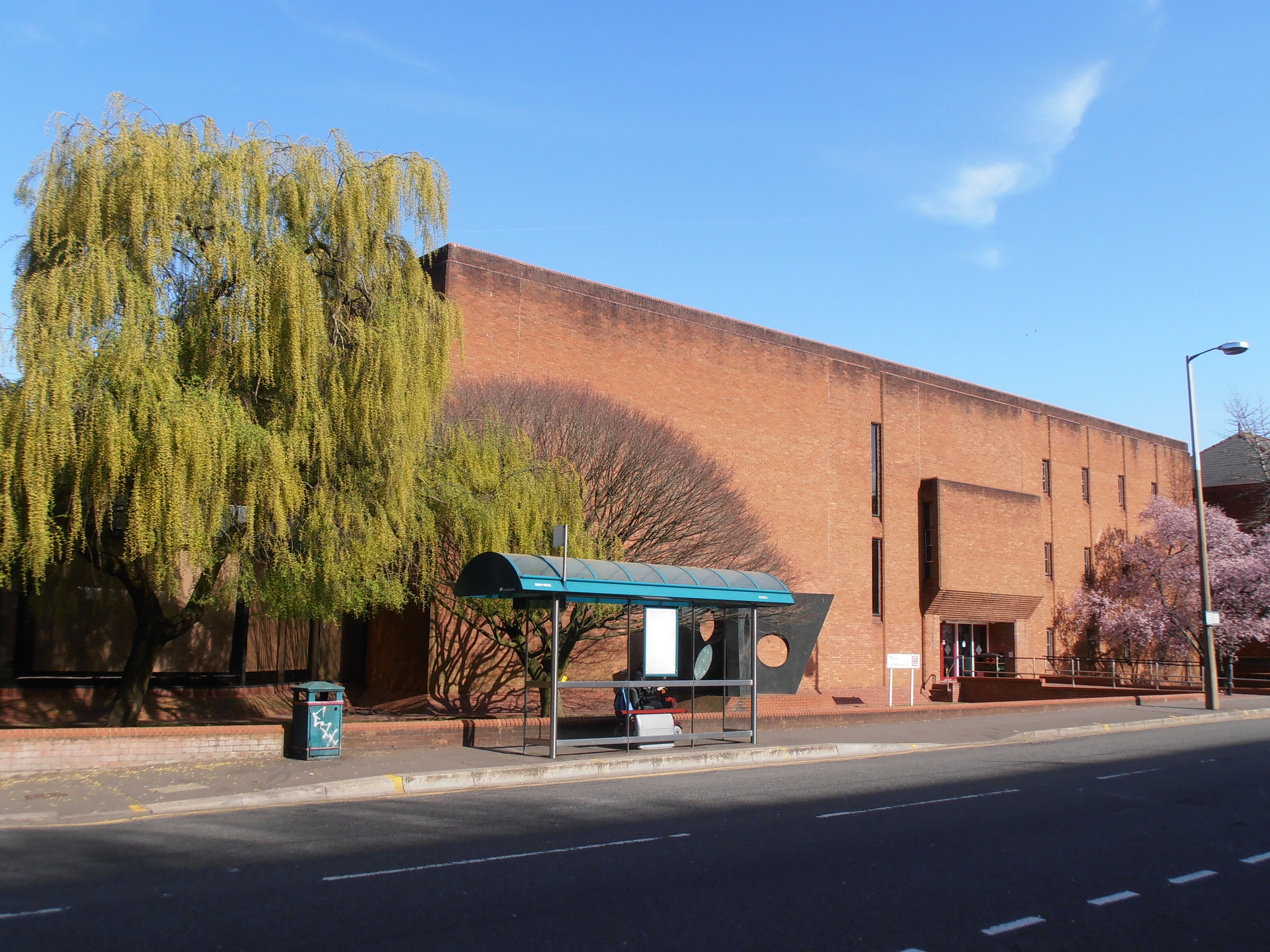
Cardiff University School of Music (1970)

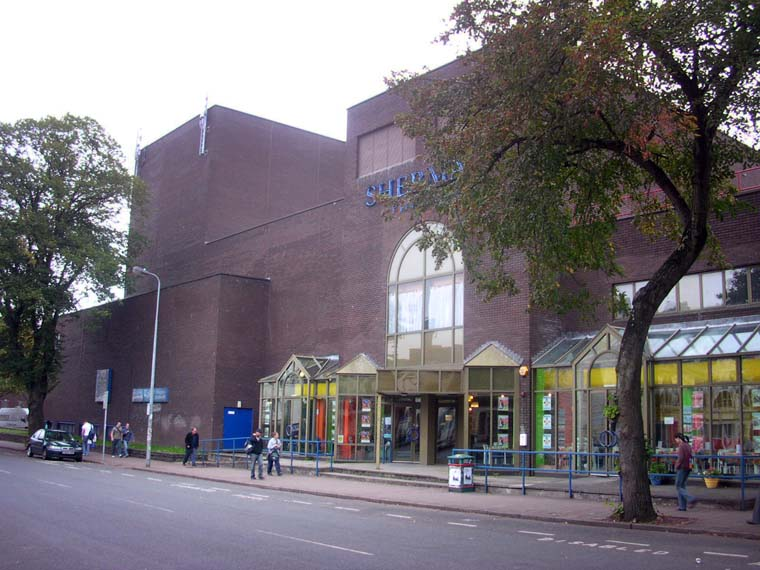
Sherman Theatre, Cardiff (1971)

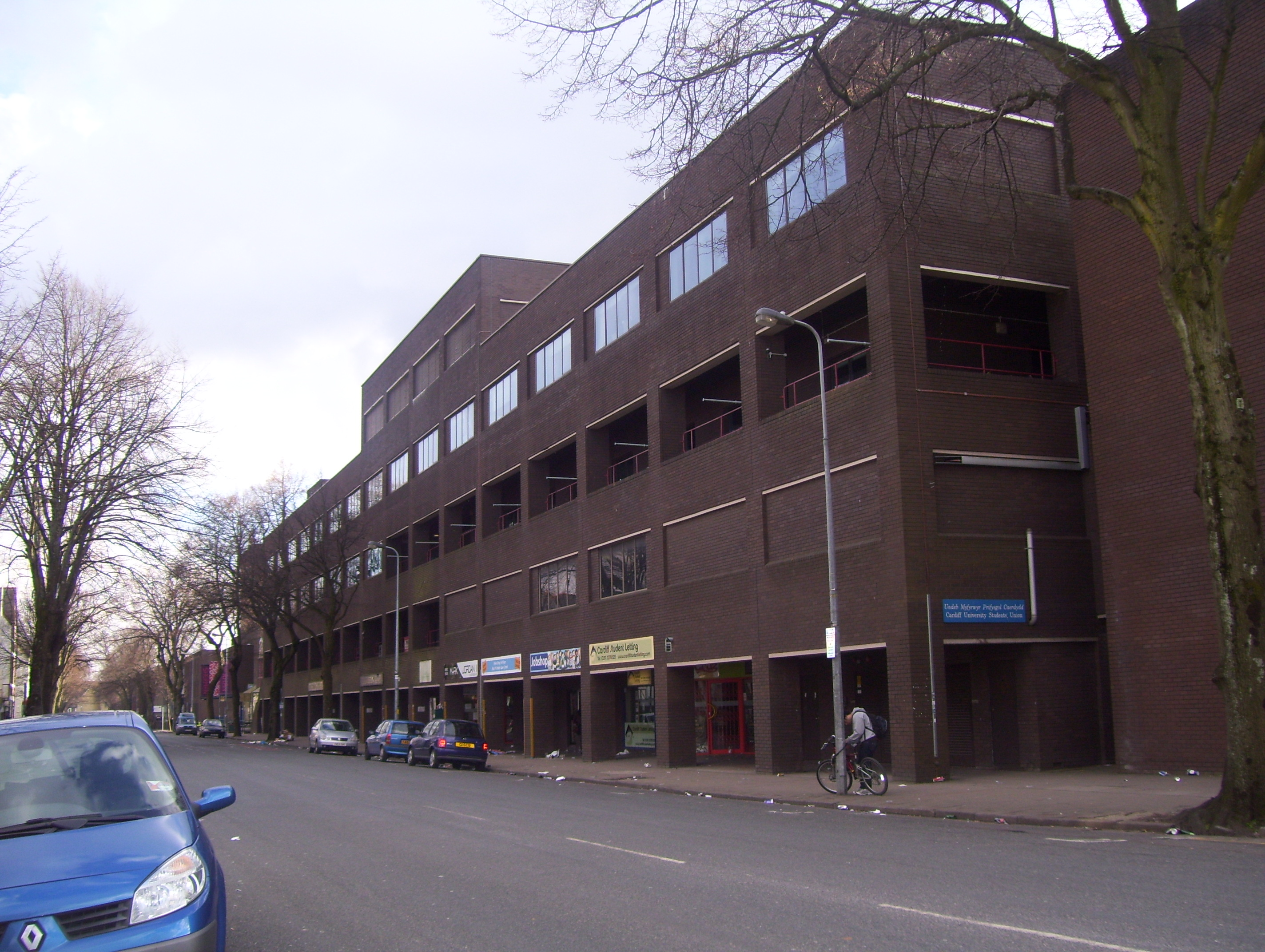
Cardiff University Student Union building (1973)

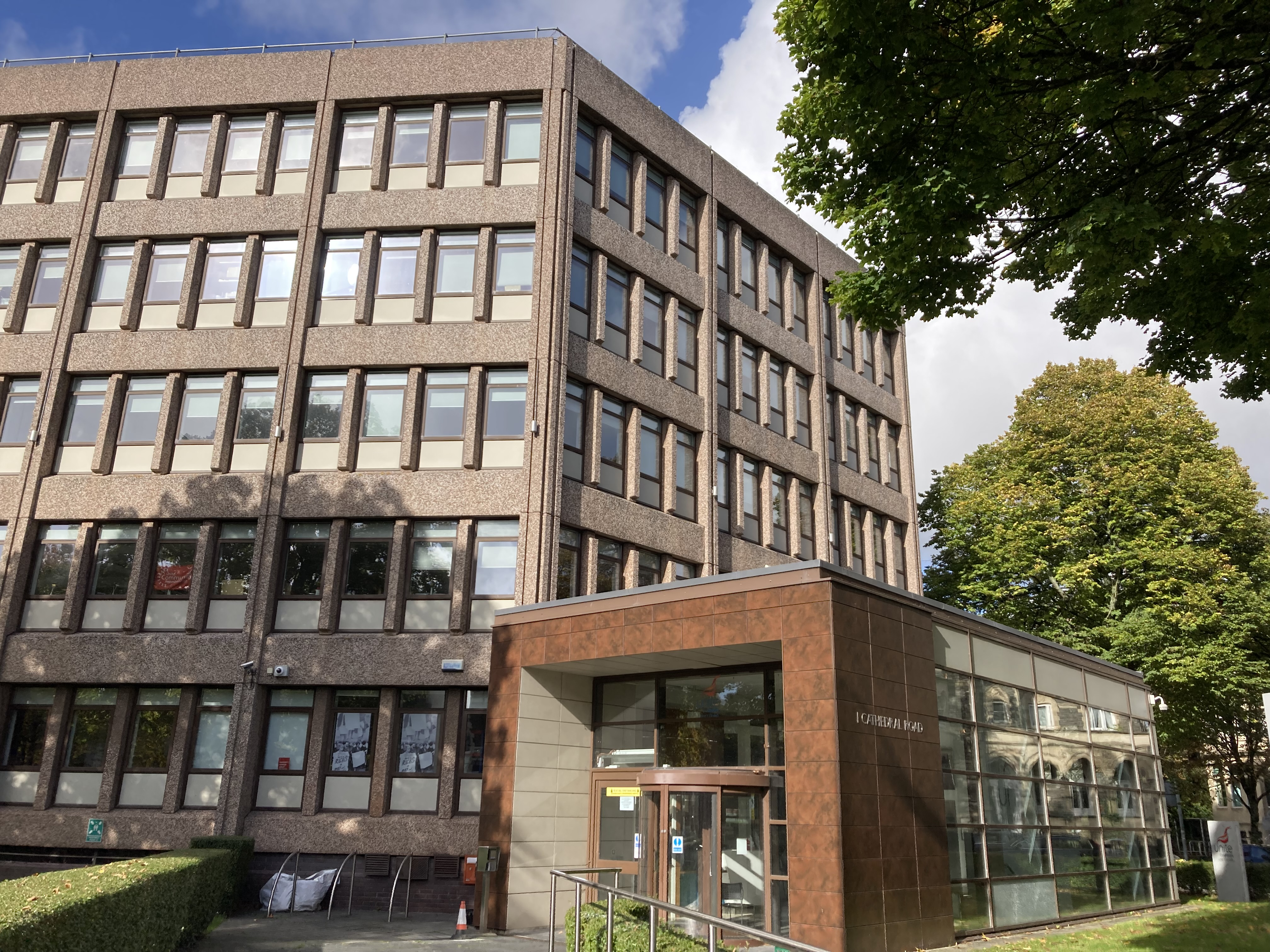
Transport House, Cardiff (1978)

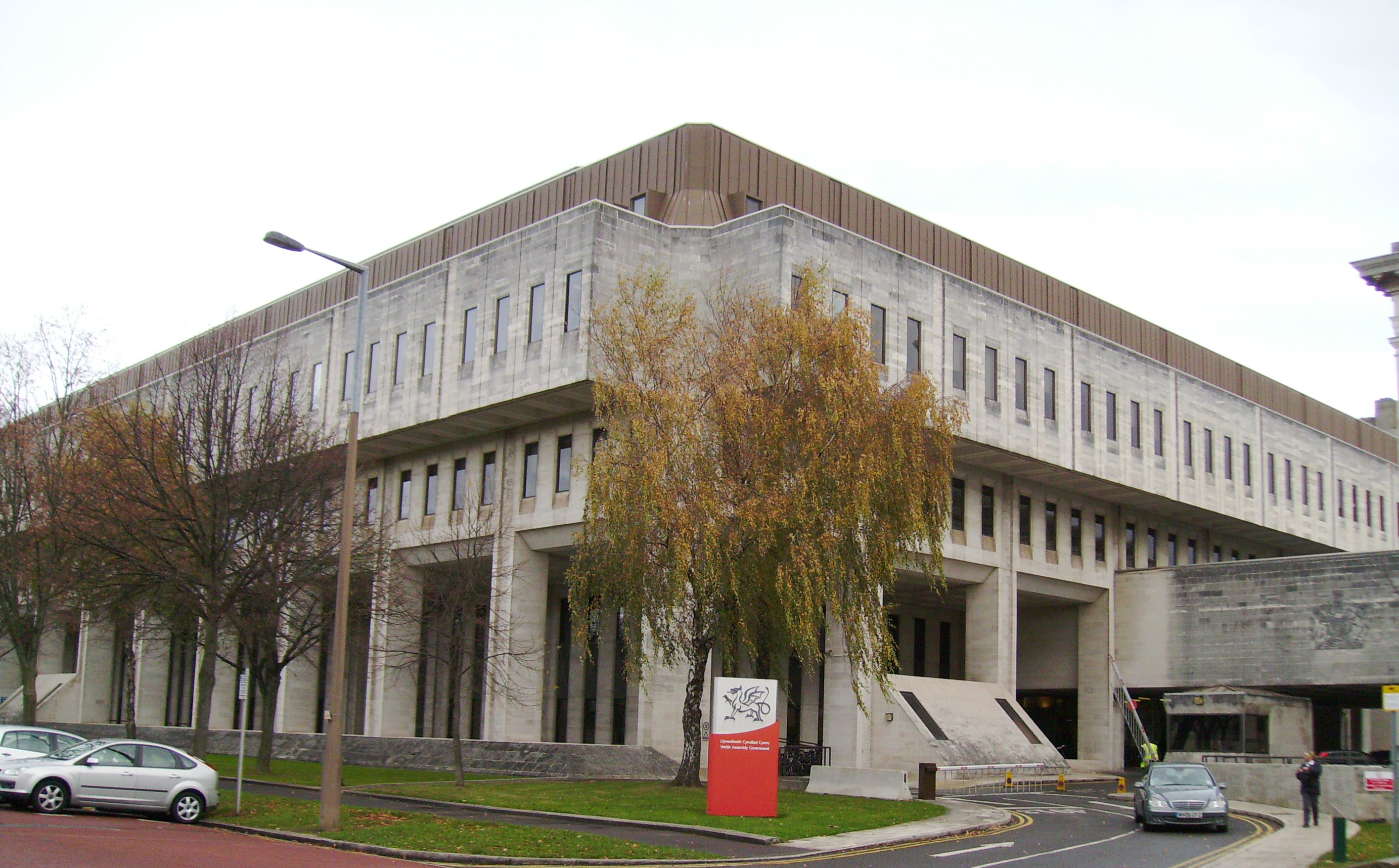
Crown Building 2, Cardiff (1979)

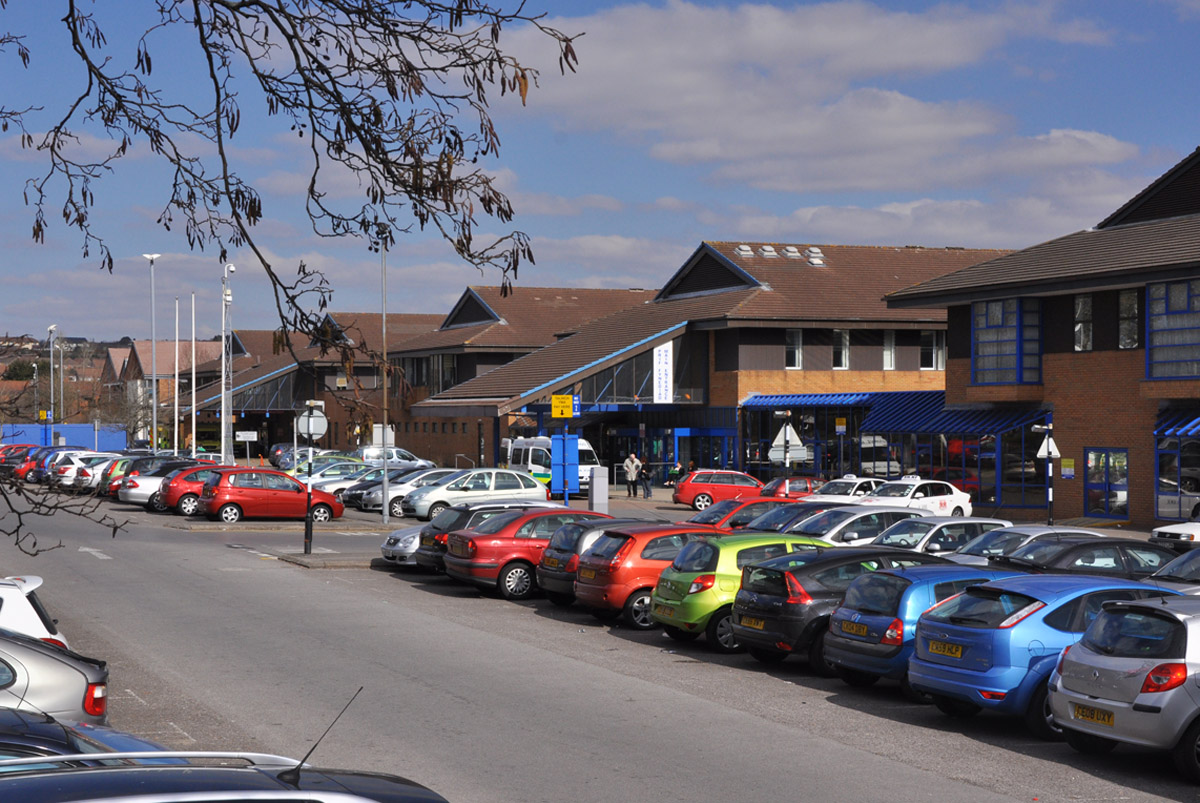
Princess of Wales Hospital, Bridgend (1981)

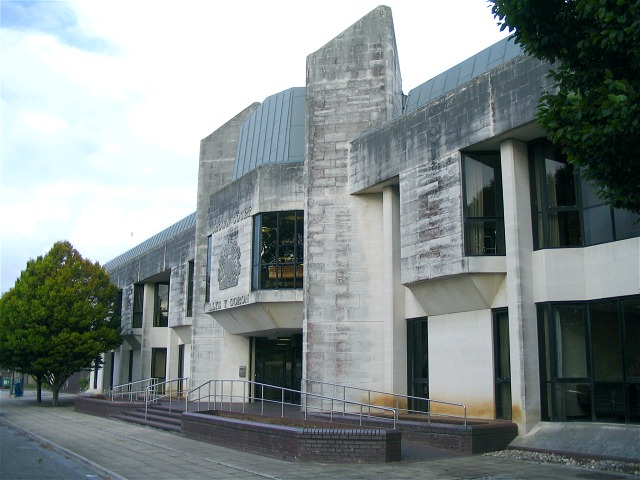
Swansea Crown Court (1988)

== Public committees ==
- Cardiff Development Corporation
- Design Council
- Royal Fine Art Commission
- University Grants Committee
- Welsh Arts Council

== Awards and honours ==
- OBE (1967)
- Honorary LL.D, University of Wales (1972)
- CBE (1974)
- Knighted (1988)
- Honorary fellow, University College Cardiff (1989)
- Honorary fellow, American Institute of Architects
- Honorary fellow, Royal Architectural Institute of Canada
- Honorary member, Bund Deutscher Architekten (Association of German Architects)
