= Jennie Bond =

English journalist and TV presenter (born 1950)

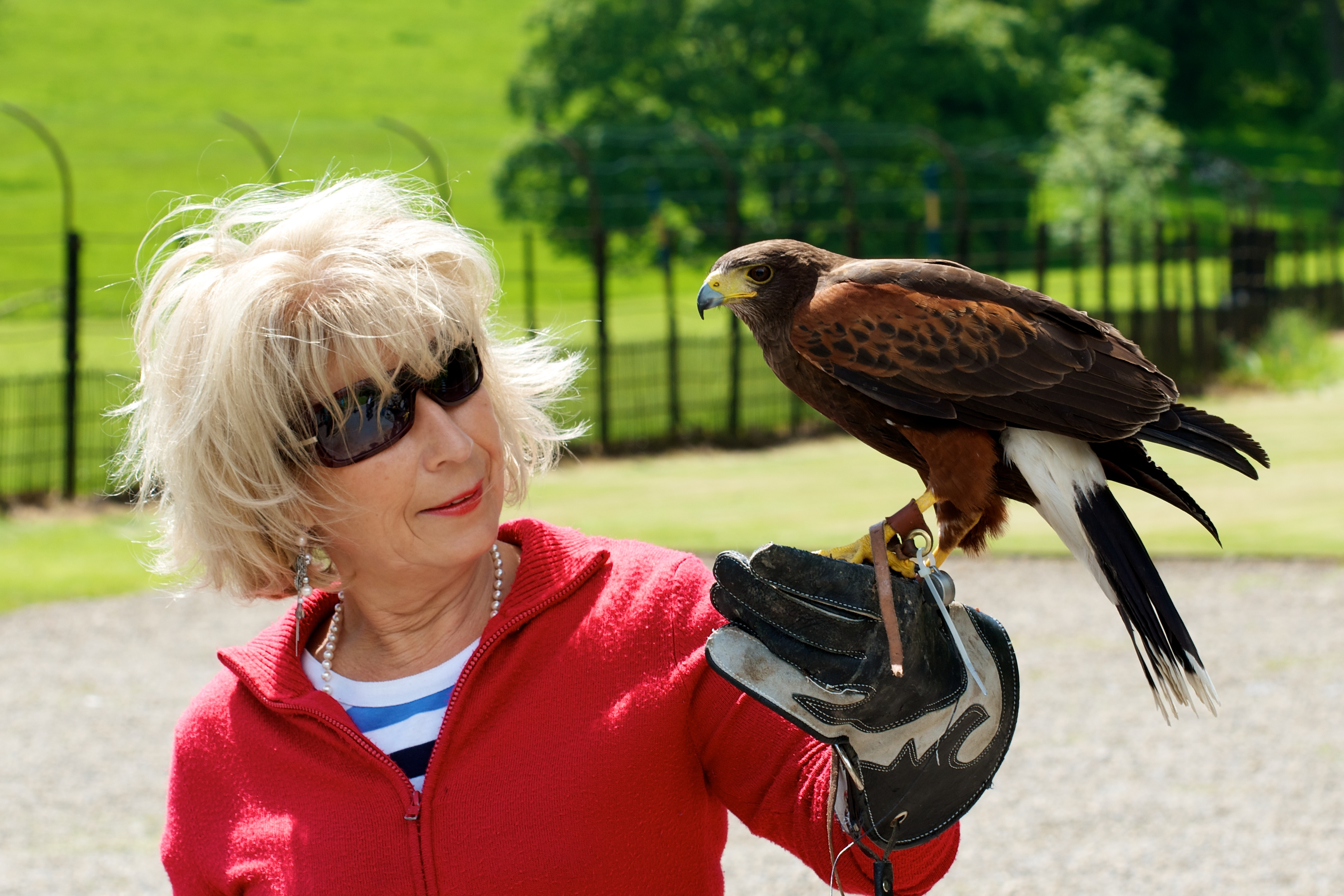
- Bond in 2012
- Born: Jennifer Bond; 19 August 1950 (age 75); Hitchin, Hertfordshire, England
- Education: University of Warwick
- Occupations: Journalist; presenter
- Notable credit(s): BBC News royal correspondent (1989–2003); The Great British Menu; Cash in the Attic
- Spouse: James Keltz (m. 1982)
- Children: 1

Jennifer Bond (born 19 August 1950) is an English journalist and television presenter. Bond worked for fourteen years as the BBC's royal correspondent. She has also hosted Cash in the Attic and narrated the programme Great British Menu.

== Early career ==
Born in Hitchin, Hertfordshire, Bond has two elder sisters, and from the age of five lived in Letchworth Garden City, where she was educated at St. Francis' College (a girls' independent school) and at the University of Warwick, from which she graduated with a degree in French and European Literature. Her career began in print, working for various local newspapers in London in journalism and sub-editing roles. Her first job in journalism was as a reporter for the Richmond Herald and then the Uxbridge Evening Mail.

In 1977, aged 27, Bond moved to BBC radio, producing and editing. She was also a producer on Woman's Hour, Tuesday Call, International Assignment and for various television documentaries.

== Royal correspondent ==
In 1985, Bond became a radio news reporter and in 1988 she began to report for television, both for the BBC. She became a royal correspondent, which was to bring her to public attention, in 1989. During the 1990s she combined her reporting with several presentational roles – regularly fronting Breakfast News, the BBC One O'Clock News and the BBC Six O'Clock News, including presenting the Six O'Clock News on the day of the death of her close friend and fellow newsreader Jill Dando.

Bond held the position as royal correspondent until the summer of 2003. During that time she reported on many dramatic and notable events connected with the royal family, including the 1992 Windsor Castle fire; two royal weddings; the break-up of Prince Andrew's marriage to Sarah Ferguson; the divorce of the Prince and Princess of Wales; the deaths of Queen Elizabeth the Queen Mother and Princess Margaret, and has reported on Elizabeth II and the Duke of Edinburgh's celebrations of her Golden Jubilee. She also travelled extensively with the Royal Family. In January 1994, she was in Australia when an attempt was made to shoot the Prince of Wales.

Bond's reporting style suggested that she was close personally to members of the Royal Family. She commented that she had become close to Diana, Princess of Wales, and that her death came as a great shock. Bond actually instigated her first extended meeting with Diana in June 1995. Bond sent the princess a note, suggesting that if she was to report on Diana properly then she should at least know what her character was actually like, not basing her thoughts on stories that had appeared in newspapers. She commented on that meeting at Kensington Palace, stating: "Princess Diana was charming, articulate, fresh, interesting, but manipulative. She knew I was a journalist. This was no girlie-girlie meeting." In November 2020, Bond wrote in The Sunday Times that the princess told her virtually all of the details she later said to Martin Bashir in the interview she gave for Panorama in November 1995.

She travelled with Diana, Princess of Wales, on her trip to Angola; with the late Queen on her first official visits to Russia in 1994; and when she met Nelson Mandela in South Africa a year later. However, her hardest and most challenging assignments were when she had to report on Diana's death and funeral in 1997.

== Life after the BBC ==
Following her departure from the BBC in 2003, Bond's career took a different turn. In 2003, she made an appearance in an episode of the comedy series Little Britain. In February 2004, she proved popular with the public when she finished as runner-up in the third series of the reality TV show I'm a Celebrity...Get Me Out of Here! This episode, broadcast on 9 February, received viewing figures of 14.99 million, making it the most watched programme on ITV and BBC One that week.

Bond appeared on I'm a Celebrity to raise money for the Devon Air Ambulance and raised £260,989.85 which the charity used to buy a state-of-the-art navigation system and to extend its helicopter flying time throughout the summer. During her time on the reality television show, she was required to do various 'bushtucker' trials, which involved her eating various creatures such as a stick insect and a witchety grub, as well as being placed in a dark, water-filled coffin with rats for ten minutes. She also fell out with fellow contestant Lord Brocket during the programme.

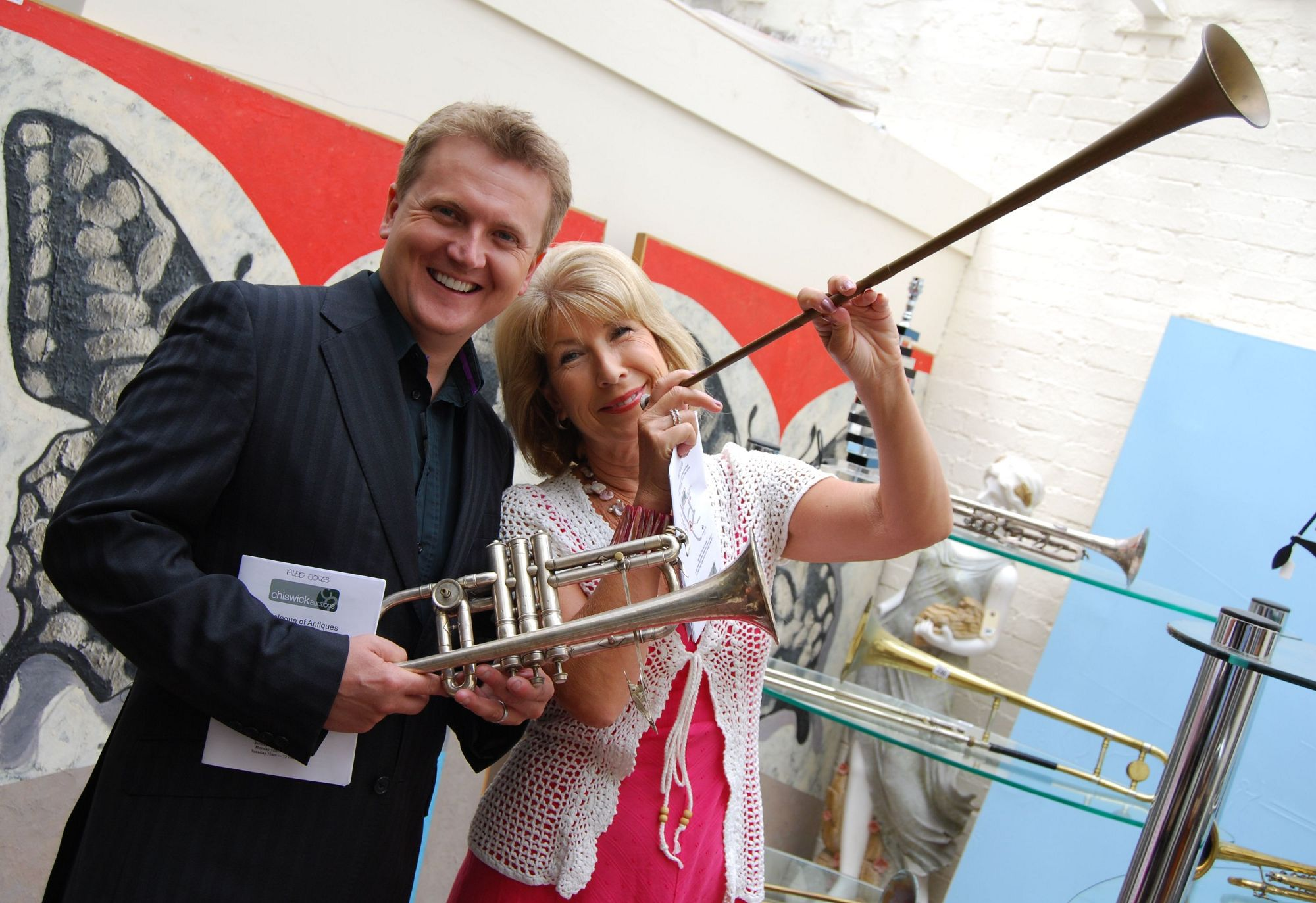
Bond (right) pictured with co-host Aled Jones, during filming for Cash in the Attic in 2010

She subsequently presented American TV cable and satellite network E!'s coverage of the BAFTA film awards, Live from the Red Carpet. She also presented her own three-part documentary called Jennie Bond's Royals on Channel 5 and in 2005, she presented the BBC's daytime coverage of the Chelsea Flower Show, alongside Charlie Dimmock. In the same year, Bond appeared in Have I Been Here Before? More recently she appeared in Posh Swap on Five, where she was transformed into a Brummie woman. She had to convince two of her best friends she really was the Brummie.

Bond was also the host for the first series of Great British Menu, in which different chefs have to compete by cooking meals; the winner of the first series had the chance to cook for the Queen on her 80th birthday. Bond has presented the BBC's Cash in the Attic. In 2006, she was a celebrity guest on Stars in Their Eyes where she sang as Debbie Harry. She presented the second series of Great British Menu during April and May 2007.

On 28 July 2007, Bond appeared in a special celebrity version of Who Wants to Be a Millionaire? with Michael Buerk to raise money for National Children's Home, the children's charity now called Action for Children. In a combined effort, they raised £64,000. On 22 August 2007, she presented an episode of Driving Me Crazy which saw her investigating whether the authorities are giving motorists excessive penalties through speeding fines and parking tickets.

She has featured as the celebrity 'hider' in a 2008 episode of the CBBC show Hider in the House. In the show, she managed to complete all her challenges without being 'discovered'. She (also in 2008), hosted a show called Lost Royals. Bond took part in ITV's entertainment show Born to Shine in aid of Save the Children.

She took part in a celebrity episode of The Chase in 2011, where she won £20,000 for the Devon Air Ambulance.

In September 2012, Bond appeared alongside Susie Dent on the Channel 4 programme Countdown.

== Personal life ==
In 1982 Bond married James W. Keltz. The couple have one daughter, born in 1990. They live in East Prawle, Devon, having moved from Muswell Hill, north London in 2004.

== Bibliography ==
- Reporting Royalty: Behind the scenes with the BBC's Royal Correspondent (2001)
- The Little Princess (2002)
- Elizabeth: Fifty Glorious Years (2003)
- Elizabeth (2006)
