= Colchester High School =

Coordinates: 51°53′11.6″N 0°53′26.1″E

Colchester Prep and High School
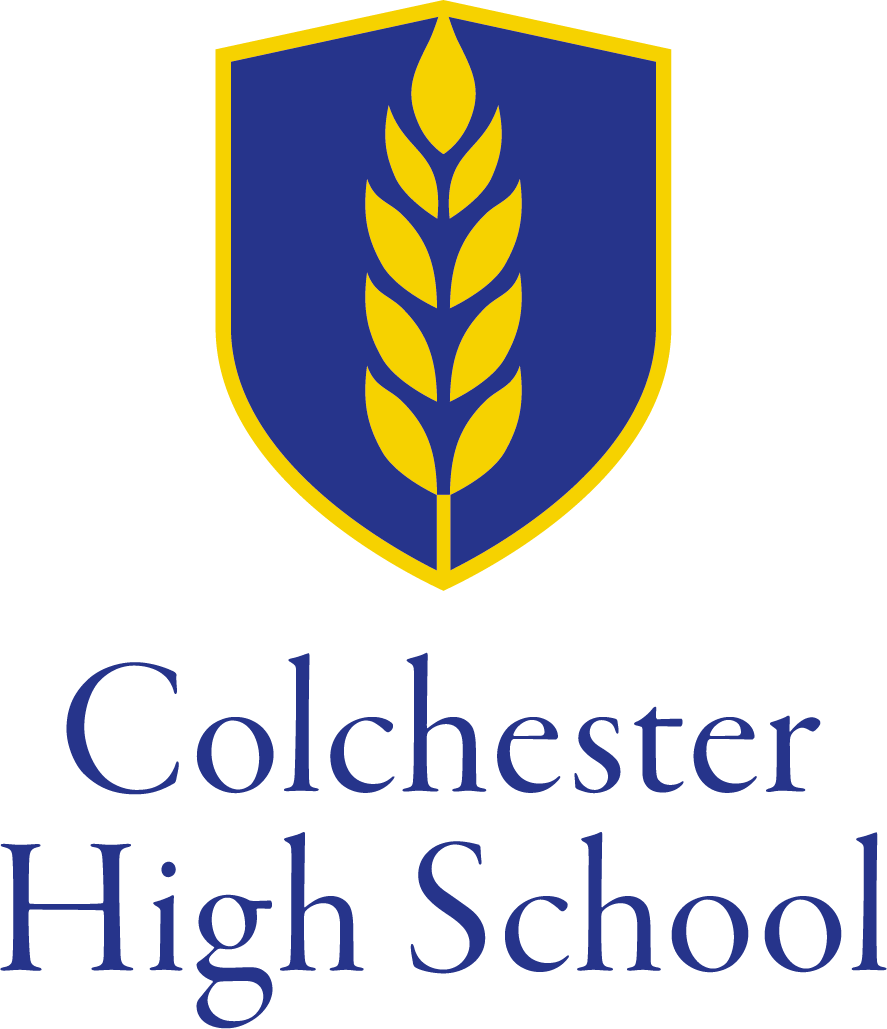
- Colchester, Essex; England

Information
- Type: Private day school
- Motto: God first, Others second, Self last Changemakers of Tomorrow’s World
- Religious affiliation: Christian
- Established: 1882
- Department for Education URN: 115409 Tables
- Ofsted: Reports
- Chair of Governors: David Baldwin
- Headteacher: Karen Gracie-Langrick
- Staff: 86
- Gender: Mixed
- Age: 2 1/2 to 16
- Enrolment: 380
- Houses: Normans; Romans; Saxons; Danes
- Colours: Blue and yellow
- Publication: The Royal Blue
- Website: www.colchesterhighschool.co.uk

Colchester Prep and High School, or CPHS, is a coeducational independent school located in Colchester in Essex, England. The school is owned and operated by the Cognita Group.

== History ==
The school was a girls' school when it opened in 1882. It took boys from 1910, becoming an all-boys establishment over the course of the next 20 years. In 1993 the school started admitting girls again. In 2005, it was bought by Cognita.

== The school today ==
The school admits pupils aged 2 1/2 to 16 from a wide catchment area including Colchester, Braintree, Marks Tey, Coggeshall, Kelvedon, Tiptree, Maldon, and Wivenhoe. Entry is normally at ages 2 1/2–15.
