= Garreg Lwyd (Rhayader) =

Hill (498.1m) in Powys, Wales

Coordinates: 52.34753°N 3.55462°W

Highest point
- Elevation: 498 m (1,634 ft)
- Prominence: 205 m (673 ft)
- Parent peak: Pegwn Mawr
- Listing: Marilyn

Naming
- English translation: grey rock
- Language of name: Welsh
- Pronunciation: Welsh: [ˈɡarɛɡ ˈlʊi̯d]

Geography
- Location: Powys, United Kingdom
- Parent range: Cambrian Mountains
- OS grid: SN942733
- Topo map: OS Landranger 147

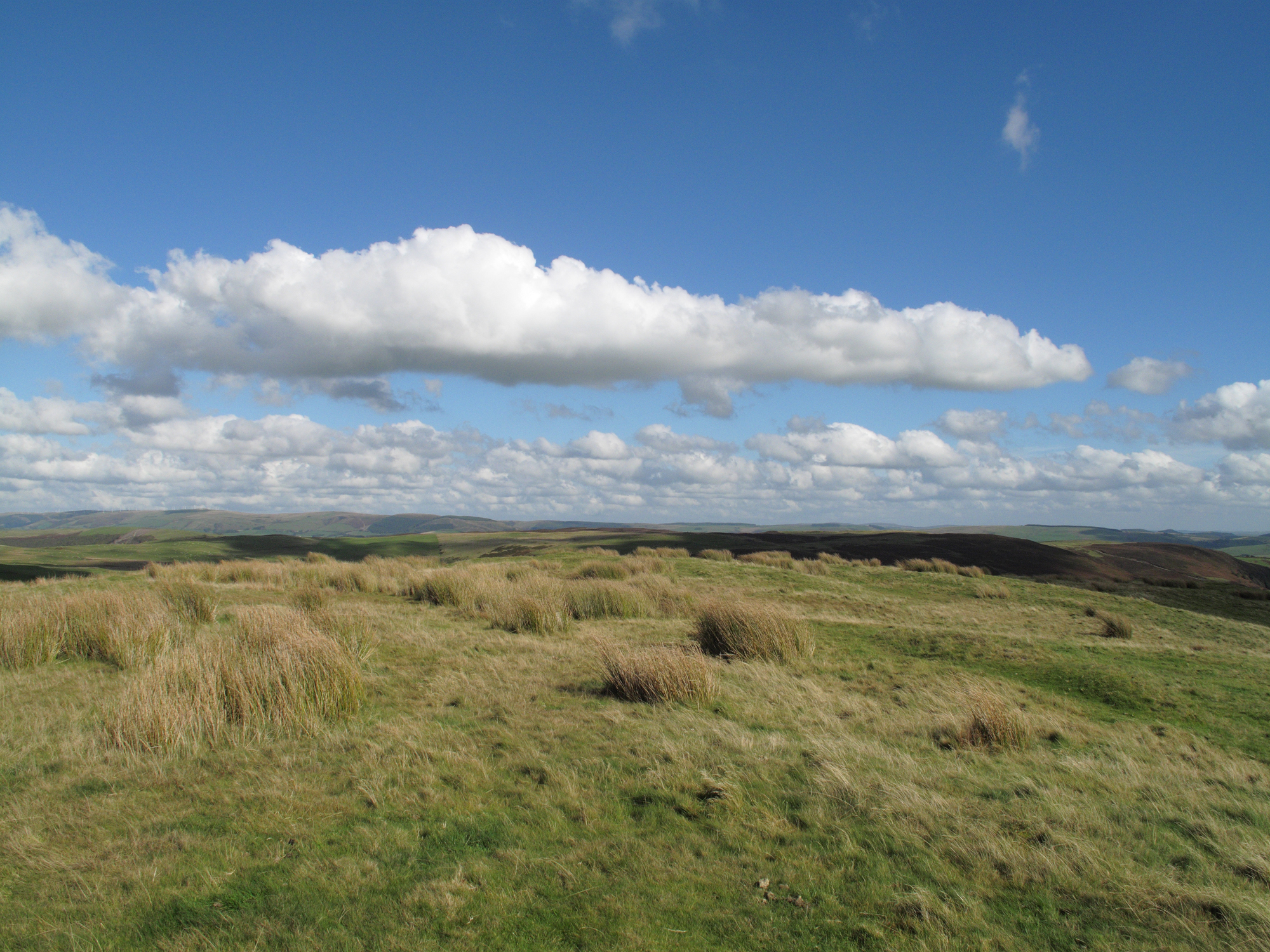
Summit area of Garret Lwyd

Garreg Lwyd is a hill in Mid Wales, between the towns of Rhayader and Llangurig. It rises to the east above the A470 as it follows the Wye Valley. The Bryn Titli Wind Farm is situated on an area of flatter moorland to the north-west. Red kites frequent the area.
