= Best-kept village =

Award for villages in the UK

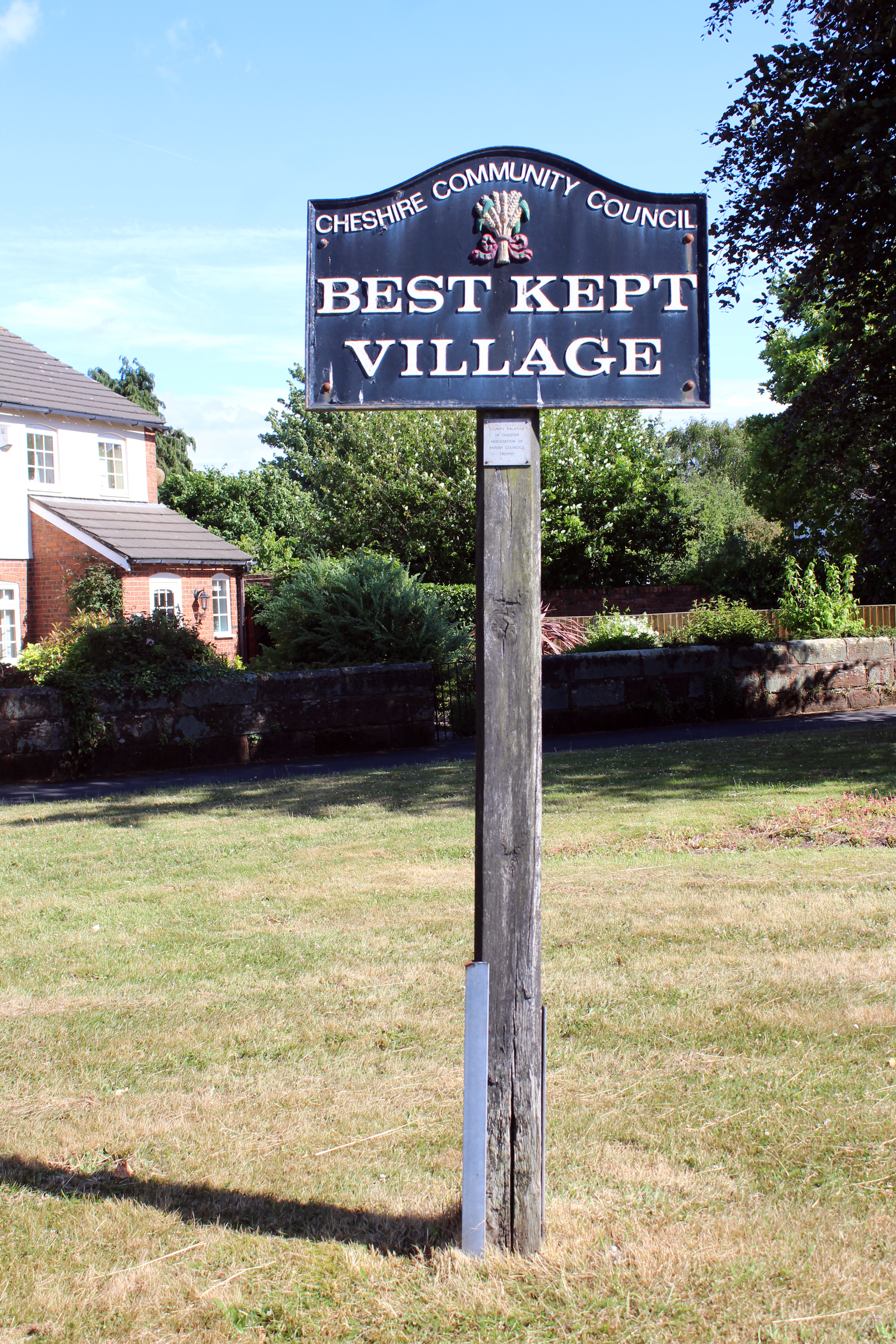
A best kept village sign in Willaston, Cheshire

A best-kept village is a village that has won one of the annual county competitions in the United Kingdom for its tidiness, appropriateness, and typicality. The competitions have been nationally organized by the Campaign to Protect Rural England (CPRE) since the early 1970s.

== Criteria ==
Competing villages fall into one of four groups:

1. Villages that have won in the past 5 years
2. Villages of a population between 500 and 3,000
3. Villages of a population up to 500
4. Villages that are new to the competition or have not entered for 10 years.

A panel of anonymous judges, touring between May and June and conducting final judging in July and August, evaluates each village on the following criteria:

- Absence of litter and unsightly refuse dumps on verges (10 points)
- Condition of village greens, playing fields, school yards, public seats, and noticeboards (10 points)
- Condition of public and private buildings, gardens, and allotments (10 points)
- Condition of churchyards, cemeteries, and war memorials (10 points)
- Condition of public halls, sports facilities, and car parks (10 points)
- Cleanliness of public toilets, bus shelters, and telephone kiosks (10 points)
- State of footpaths, stiles, field gates, signposting, ponds, and streams (10 points)
- Condition of commercial and business premises, including advertisements and other signs (10 points)
- Initiative in the care of the environment of the village (10 points)
- Evidence of community spirit and usefulness of Village Map (10 points)

The CPRE makes it clear that the competition is not about finding "the most beautiful village, nor the most ancient, nor the most picturesque, just the one that is best cared for" and "its aim is to involve everyone in the village, encouraging them to take greater pride in their surroundings." Villages are judged on how clean and well cared for they are, as well as their impact on the environment.

== Awards and benefits ==
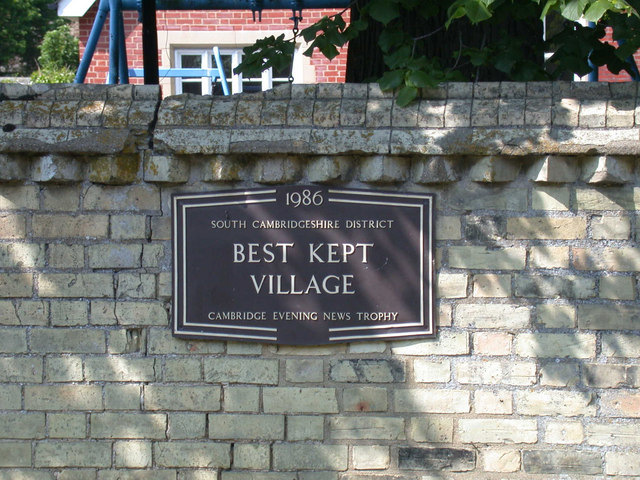
A Best Kept Village plaque in Harlton, Cambridgeshire

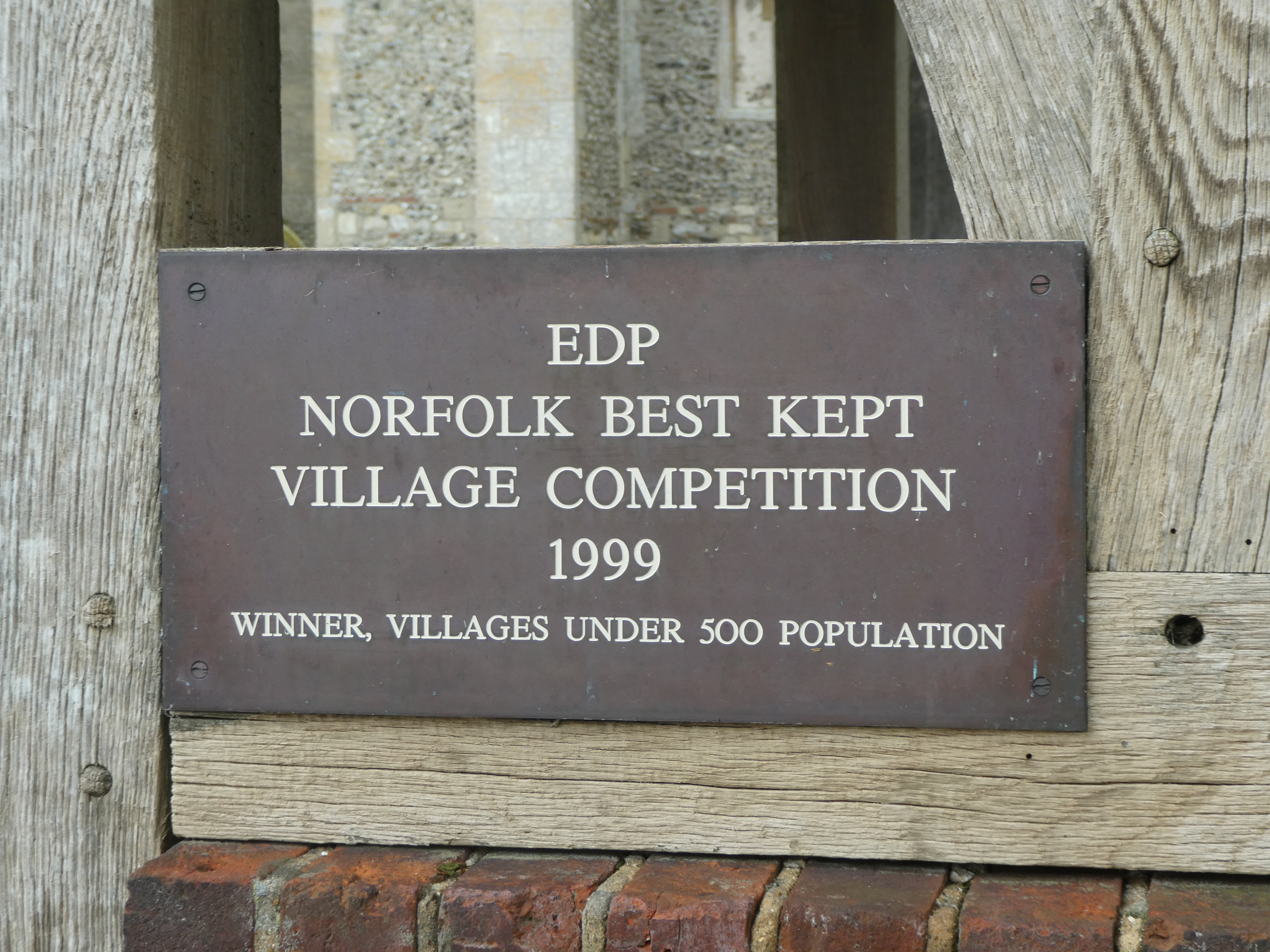
A Best Kept Village plaque in Salle, Norfolk.

Winners of group A (those which have already won in the previous five years) receive the Pertwee Bowl for Past Winners, while winners in the other groups receive a CPRE shield. Group winners also receive a "Best Kept Village" road sign and certificates.

Noted benefits include decreased littering, greater community communication, communal pride in homes and public spaces, a more attractive and welcoming appearance, name recognition for the village, and increased tourism and income for local businesses.

== Criticism ==
Criticisms of the competition include "townies" moving into villages and changing the local culture and villagers who do not fit in with the ethos of a "best kept village" may be excluded.

== In fiction ==
- Ambridge, Borsetshire has been a winner in the radio soap opera The Archers.
- At the start of the "Dibley Live" (1998) episode of the TV comedy The Vicar of Dibley, the council members forgo entering the competition, having come in 54th out of 54 the previous year; Denfield, where a lorry-load of BSE-infected toxic waste had crashed into a nuclear fuel tanker causing a crater 200 ft wide and the evacuation of the entire village, was 53rd.
- The Postman Pat episode Postman Pat had the Best Village focus on the villagers of Greendale making their village nice and clean and decked with beautiful flowers so they could try and win the Best Village Competition. Greendale win the competition thanks to a new hillock; which was Ted Glen's lorry covered with flowerpots and shrubs with some pretended grass covering the lorry and a fence around it.
- Much of the plot to the 2007 British film Hot Fuzz revolves around the lengths the citizens of Sandford will go to in their attempt at keeping a best kept village award.
- In the novel The Killings at Badger's Drift (adapted into the pilot episode of Midsomer Murders) the titular village has won the award six times. The Midsomer Murders episode "Judgement Day" revolves around a Perfect Village Competition.
