= Butte (disambiguation) =

A butte is an isolated hill with steep sides and a flat top.

Butte may also refer to:

== Places ==
- Butte (Besançon), area of Besançon, France
- Buttes, Neuchâtel
- Butte, Alaska
- Butte, Montana
- Butte Mountains, Nevada
- Butte, Nebraska
- Butte, North Dakota
- Butte, the former name for Butte City, Glenn County, California
- Butte Lake (California)

== People ==
- Antoinette Butte, French founder of Girl Guiding
- Atul Butte (1970–2025), American medical researcher
- George C. Butte, American jurist, educator, and politician
- John Butte (disambiguation)
- Rüdiger Butte (1949–2013), German politician

== Other uses ==
- USS Butte (disambiguation)
- Butte potato

== See also ==
- BUT (disambiguation)
- Bute (disambiguation)
- Butt (disambiguation)
- Butts (disambiguation)
- Butte City (disambiguation)
- Butte County (disambiguation)
- Butte Creek (disambiguation)
- La Butte (disambiguation)
