= Percy Thomas Partnership =

British architectural practice

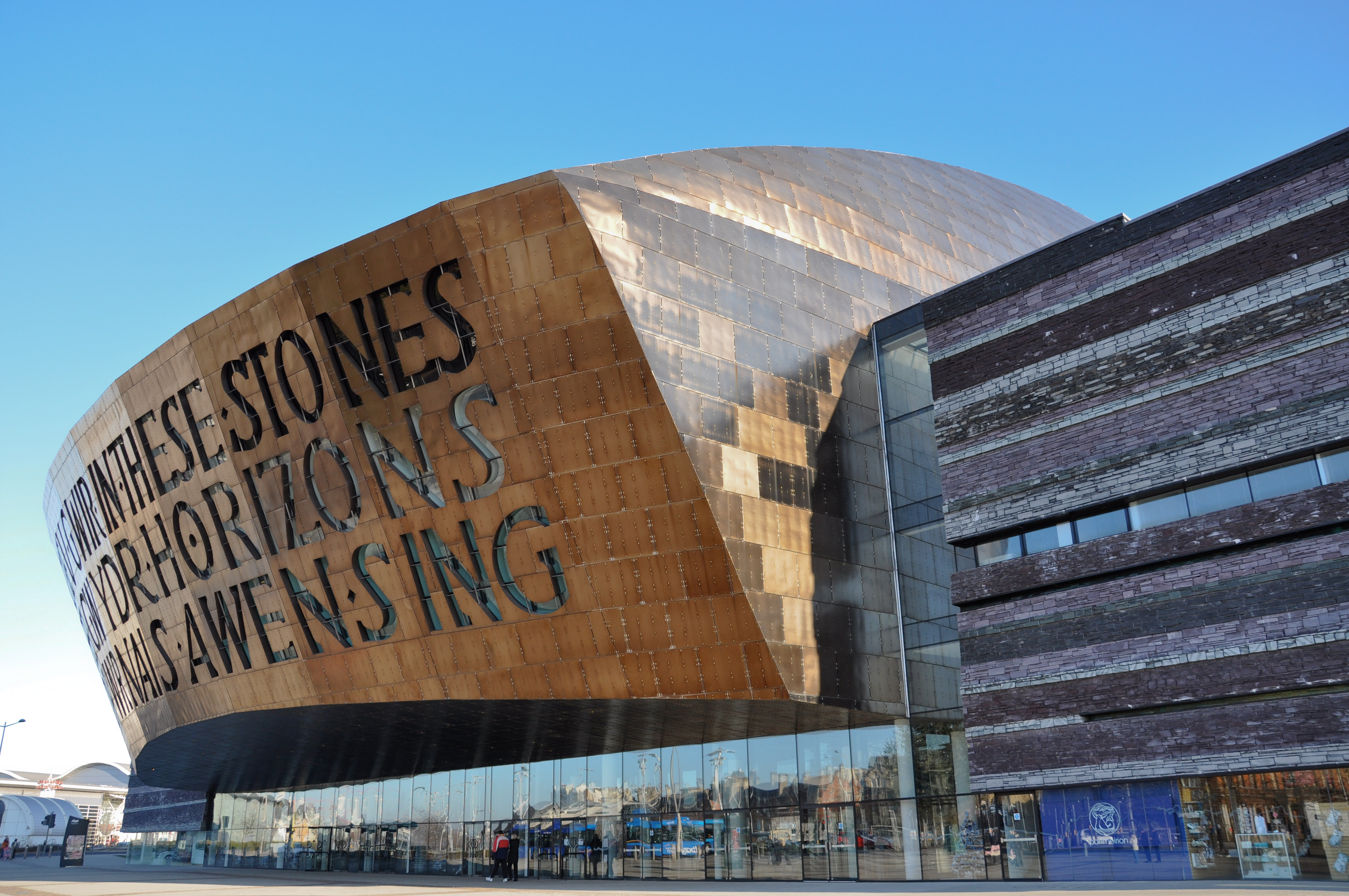
Wales Millennium Centre, Cardiff Bay. Designed by Percy Thomas Partnership. Built 2002–4.

Percy Thomas Partnership was the trading name of the award-winning British architectural practice established some time between 1965 and 1973 as the successor to a series of earlier partnerships originally set up by Percy Thomas (1883–1969) in Cardiff, Wales in 1911/12. Percy Thomas and the Percy Thomas Partnership put their name to a number of landmark buildings in the United Kingdom including the Wales Millennium Centre, Cardiff. It opened offices overseas and completed a number of prestigious buildings in Hong Kong.

Percy Thomas Partnership came to an end in 2004 when they went into administration and were bought by Capita Group.

== History ==
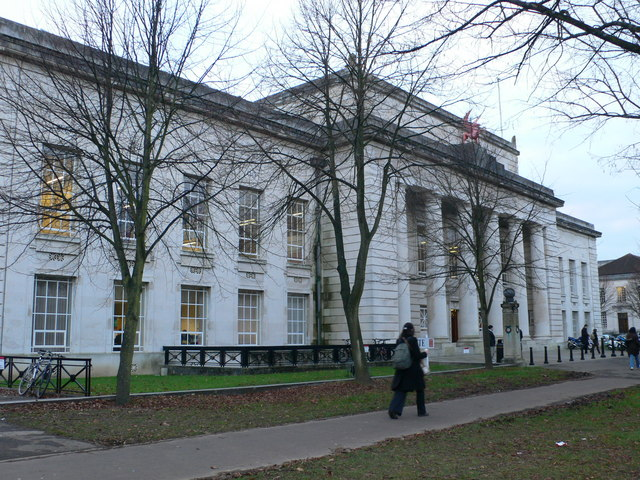
Bute Building, Cardiff (previously the Cardiff Technical College) designed by Percy Thomas and Ivor Davies. Built 1913–16.

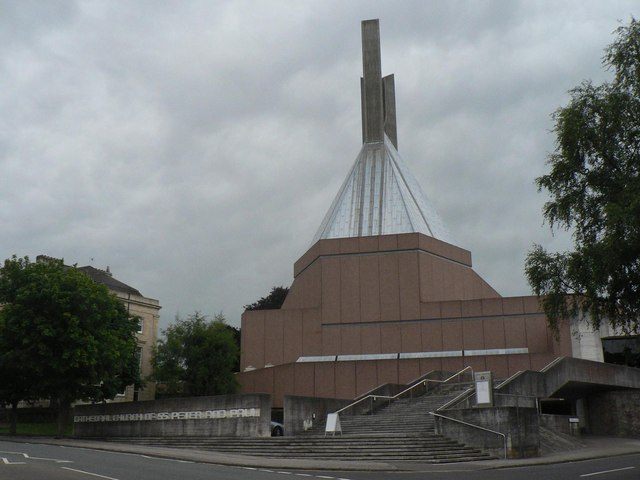
Clifton Cathedral, Bristol. Designed by Percy Thomas Partnership. Built 1970–73.

Percy Edward Thomas was born in the northeast of England in 1883, but was well-travelled and started work as at a young age in Cardiff, Wales. He was articled to study architecture, and won the National Eisteddfod of Wales architecture competition in 1903. He returned to England to work, but began collaborating with Ivor Jones of Cardiff, in architectural competitions. In 1911 they won the competition to design Cardiff's new Technical College (now known as the Bute Building), and Thomas returned to Cardiff to work in partnership with Jones.

Percy Thomas's architectural practice was set up in 1911/12.

During the 1920s and 1930s the practice won a large number of commissions to design important civic buildings in Wales and England, including county offices for Glamorgan and Carmarthenshire, Lord Davies' Temple of Peace, Swansea Civic Centre, Aberystwyth University campus and a redesign of London's Euston Station.

The partnership with Ivor Jones was amicably dissolved in 1937.

In 1946 Percy Thomas was knighted. In the same year Percy Thomas's son Norman joined the practice – which became known as Sir Percy Thomas & Son.

In 1952 William Marsden and Wallace Sweet joined the practice. John Francis Vergette joined (in Swansea) in 1955.

Percy Thomas became seriously ill in 1962, retiring from the company in 1963. Percy Thomas died in 1969.

In 1965 Sir Percy Thomas & Son were commissioned to design Clifton Cathedral, a new Roman Catholic cathedral for the city of Bristol. The design was by Ronald Weeks, Fred Jennett and Antoni Poremba. The cathedral was consecrated in 1973, by which time the architectural practice was known as Percy Thomas Partnership.

Norman Thomas retired as chairman in 1971, becoming a consulting partner until 1976. Thomas was replaced as chairman by Fred Jennet, who initiated expansion into the Middle East

In 1992 Percy Thomas Partnership incorporated and became PTP Ltd with John Vergette as chairman and chief executive. John founded the Royal Society of Architects in Wales (RSAW) and was president 1971–73.

PTP eventually had six offices in the United Kingdom, as well as offices in Malaysia, Hong Kong and elsewhere.

One of Percy Thomas Partnership's last works was the Wales Millennium Centre in Cardiff (2004). It was designed by Jonathan Adams, who had joined the practice in 1998. The award selectors for the Wales National Eisteddfod Gold Medal for Architecture 2005 described the building as "a special place which will provide a focal point for the unique culture, identity and talents of Wales... The large mass of the building has been successfully formed into an impressive edifice as opposed to an oppressive monolith... In terms of texture, colour, selection of materials and spatial experience this is a feast to be enjoyed".

== Awards ==
=== RIBA awards ===
- R.I.B.A. Bronze Medal in 1938 for the design of the Temple of Peace, Cardiff.
- R.I.B.A. Gold Medal for the design of the Swinton Town Hall.
- RIBA Wales Award (2005) for the Wales Millennium Centre, Cardiff.

=== National Eisteddfod of Wales Gold Medals for Architecture ===
- 1970, for the Physics & Mathematics Building, University College, Swansea.
- 1971, for the Great Hall, Students Union and central concourse, University College, Aberystwyth.
- 1974, for the Albert Edward, Prince of Wales Court for the Elderly, Porthcawl.
- 1976, for the Parke Davies Pharmaceutical Plant, Pontypool.
- 1978, for the Welsh Folk Museum, St Fagans, Cardiff.
- 1983, for the Amersham International Laboratories, Cardiff.
- 2005, for the Wales Millennium Centre.

=== Other awards ===
- Concrete Society Award (1974) for Clifton Cathedral (a 'Winner of Winners' Award was achieved in 2007 for the quality and longevity of its concrete).

== Key buildings and projects ==
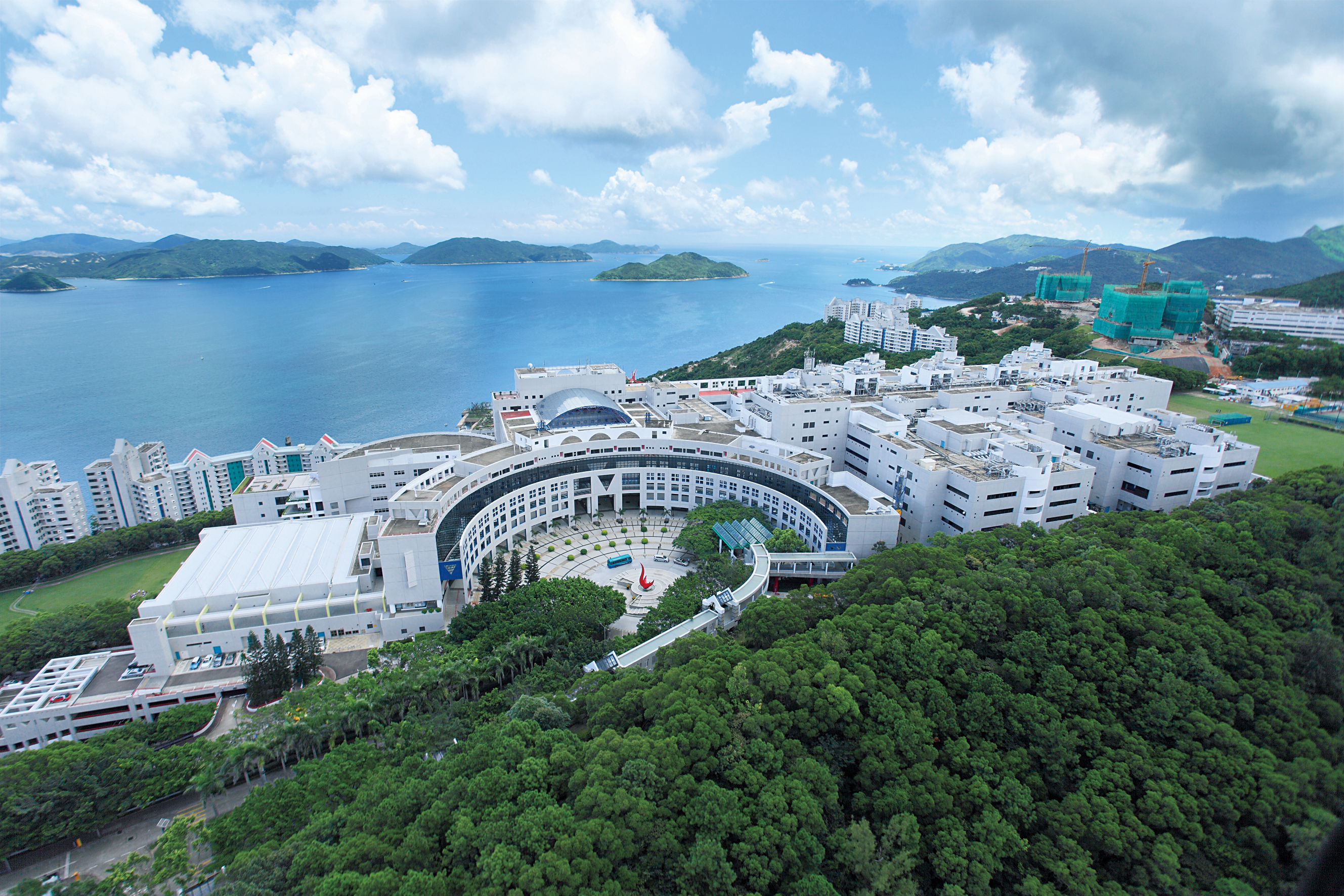
Hong Kong University of Science and Technology

- Cardiff Technical College, Cathays park, Cardiff (opened 1916). Competition to design the building was won by Percy Thomas and Ivor Jones in 1911.
- Bristol Police Station and Bristol Fire Station, Bristol (opened 1930).
- Aberystwyth University Campus, Penglais, Aberystwyth (1935/1966). Masterplans for the campus were designed by Percy Thomas in 1935 and Percy Thomas Partnership in 1966.
- The Guildhall, Swansea (opened 1938).
- Swinton Town Hall, Swinton and Pendlebury, Lancashire (opened Sept 1938). Competition to design it was won by Percy Thomas and Ernest Prestwich.
- Temple of Peace, Cathays Park, Cardiff (opened Nov 1938)
- Redwood Building, Cardiff University, Cathays Park (1960–1961)
- Queen's Building, Cardiff University, Newport Road - New west wing and rebuilding of main tower (1964)
- Hiatt Baker Hall, Bristol University, Stoke Bishop (opened 1966).
- Aberystwyth Arts Centre, Aberystwyth University, Wales (opened 1970/2).
- Cathedral Church of SS. Peter and Paul, Clifton, Bristol (consecrated 1973)
- Symphony Hall, Birmingham (opened 1991).
- Swanlea Secondary School, Tower Hamlets, London, in collaboration with Hampshire County Architects (opened 1993). The school building was passively heated and ventilated.
- City University of Hong Kong (completed 1993). This project was won in an international competition, in collaboration with Fitch and Chung.
- Hong Kong University of Science and Technology (with Simon Kwan and Associates)
- Second Severn Crossing (now the Prince of Wales Bridge), between England and Wales (opened 1996)
- Wishaw General Hospital, Lanarkshire, Scotland (completed 2001).
- Wales Millennium Centre, Cardiff (opened 2004). £106 million opera house and arts venue.

== Administration and buy-out ==
In June 2004 Percy Thomas Partnership went into administration after cancellation of a large PFI project for the Ministry of Defence and delays of a number of other key projects. At the time, they had a turnover of £6 million, with 100 staff.

The company was bought by the large British outsourcing company, Capita, who created a new arm of their property consultancy division called Capita Percy Thomas. The staff and several senior directors were transferred to Capita.

In 2007 the name 'Percy Thomas' came to an end in the UK when Capita consolidated the architecture divisions within Capita Symonds into a new brand called 'Capita Architecture'.
