= Bute =

Bute or BUTE may refer to:

== People ==
- Marquess of Bute, a title in the Peerage of Great Britain; includes lists of baronets, earls and marquesses of Bute
- Lord of Bute, a title in medieval Scotland, including a list of lords
- Lucian Bute (born 1980), Romanian-Canadian boxer
- Mary Ellen Bute (1906–1983), American film animator

== Places ==
- Isle of Bute, Argyll and Bute, Scotland
  - Sound of Bute, a channel separating the Isle of Bute from Arran
- County of Bute, also known as Buteshire, in Scotland
- Bute, South Australia, a town and locality on the Yorke Peninsula, South Australia, Australia
- Bute, Kenya, a town in Wajir County, Kenya
- Bute Inlet, British Columbia, Canada
- Bute County, North Carolina, United States
- Bute Street, Cardiff, Wales
- Bute Park, a park in Cardiff
- Bute Street, Hong Kong
- Bute Street, London, England

== Drugs ==
- Phenylbutazone, also called "bute", an anti-inflammatory drug commonly used for horses
- Clenbuterol, occasionally called "bute", a slang term for a stimulant bronchodilator veterinary drug

== Other uses ==
- Bute (mythology), also Budtė, the Lithuanian goddess of wisdom
- Bute (Greek mythology), also Butes, an Argonaut in Greek mythology
- Bute Medical School, the medical school of the University of St Andrews
- MV Bute, a Caledonian MacBrayne ferry
- MV Bute (1954), a Clyde vehicle ferry from 1954 to 1978
- Bute House, Edinburgh, official residence of the First Minister of Scotland
- Bute Building, a Cardiff University building
- Budapest University of Technology and Economics

== See also ==
- SS Empire Bute, a coastal tanker employed by the British government in the Second World War
- Butte (disambiguation)
- Butes, a name
