= Butts =

Butts may refer to:

== People ==
- Butts (surname)
- Bob Butler (1891–1959), American gridiron football player
- Butts Giraud (born 1946), Canadian gridiron football player, professional wrestler and businessman
- Butts Wagner (1871–1928), American baseball player

== Places ==
=== United States ===
- Butts, Georgia, a community in Jenkins County, Georgia
- Butts, Missouri, an unincorporated community
- Butts Bridge, in Canterbury, Connecticut
- Butts County, Georgia, named after Samuel Butts
- Butts County School District

=== United Kingdom ===
- Butts Close, a park in Hitchin, Hertfordshire, England
- Butts Ferry, a hand-operated pedestrian cable ferry in Exeter, Devon, England
- The Butts Ground, a former cricket ground in Coventry, Warwickshire, England
- Butts Junction, a former railway junction near Alton, Hampshire, England
- Butts Lane Halt railway station, a former station in Blowick, Southport, Merseyside
- Butts Park Arena, a multi-use sports stadium in Coventry, England
- Butts Spur Line, an English former freight railway

== Other ==
- Butts Band, a British and American group formed by ex-Doors members
- Butts: A Backstory, a 2022 microhistory by Heather Radke

== See also ==
- BUT (disambiguation)
- Butt (disambiguation)
- Butte (disambiguation)
- Buttocks
