= Tunbridge Wells Town Hall =

Municipal building in Tunbridge Wells, Kent, England

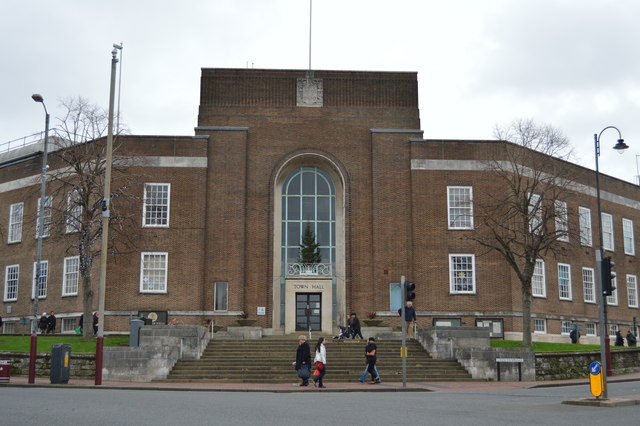
- Tunbridge Wells Town Hall

- Shown in Kent
- 51.1326°N 0.2640°E
- Location: Mount Pleasant Road, Royal Tunbridge Wells

History
- Built: 1941

Site notes
- Architect(s): Sir Percy Thomas and Ernest Prestwich
- Architectural style: Neo-Georgian style

Listed Building – Grade II
- Official name: Town Hall
- Designated: 4 August 1995
- Reference no.: 1265550

Tunbridge Wells Town Hall is a municipal building in Mount Pleasant Road, Royal Tunbridge Wells, Kent, England. The town hall, which is the headquarters of Tunbridge Wells Borough Council, is a Grade II listed building.

== History ==
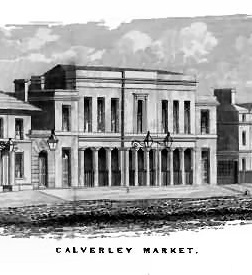
The first town hall in Calverley Street

The first town hall was a market hall designed by Decimus Burton in the neoclassical style and built as part of John Ward's Calverley Park estate in 1829. After the market hall proved to be a commercial failure, the building was acquired by the newly-appointed town commissioners and converted for municipal use in 1841. Following population growth in the late 19th century, largely associated with the town's development as a residential area, Tunbridge Wells became a municipal borough in 1888. The new corporation acquired a large site to the east of Mount Pleasant Road for the purposes of the development of a civic complex in 1895. The first development was a Technical and Art School (now the Adult Education Centre) which was completed in 1902. A war memorial, which was designed by Stanley Nicholson Babb, was unveiled by Colonel Henry Charles Hardinge, 3rd Viscount Hardinge on 11 February 1923.

Following a design competition assessed by Ernest Berry Webber, a team consisting of Sir Percy Thomas and Ernest Prestwich was chosen as the architect for the main scheme in November 1934. Construction work began with the demolition of the properties in Calverley Place. The foundation stone for the new complex was laid by the mayor, Councillor Charles Hillman, on 18 May 1938.

The new buildings were designed in the Neo-Georgian style and built in red brick with Portland stone dressings: the police station and the assembly hall were officially opened by the Marchioness Camden (whose husband was the Lord Lieutenant of Kent) in 1939 and the town hall itself was officially opened by the mayor, Alderman Charles Westbrook, in 1941. A library and museum building was added to the north of the town hall in 1952.

The design for the town hall involved a symmetrical corner section of three bays at the junction of Mount Pleasant Road and Crescent Road. The corner section featured a doorway with a stone surround at the base of a tall round-headed recessed window flanked by full-height brick pilasters supporting an architrave bearing the borough coat of arms. A western wing extended for twelve bays along Mount Pleasant Road while the southern wing extended for seven bays along Crescent Road.

The design for the Assembly Hall Theatre, built to the east of the town hall, involved a symmetrical main frontage with five bays facing onto Crescent Road with the central section of three bays slightly projected forward. It featured five doorways with a canopy above the central three doorways; above the canopy were three tall windows with carved stone reliefs in the heads of the windows: the reliefs depicted dance, drama and music and were sculpted by Gilbert Seale and Sons of Camberwell. The police station and magistrates court, built to the east of the assembly hall, featured an arched doorway with a relief depicting the administration of justice in the tympanum. Internally, the principal rooms in the complex were the council chamber and the mayor's parlour in the town hall and the main auditorium in the assembly hall.

The building continued to serve as the headquarters of Tunbridge Wells Corporation for much of the 20th century and remained the local seat of government when the enlarged Tunbridge Wells Borough Council was formed in 1974. In 1986 Princess Margaret visited the attendance hall to see a performance of the musical Calamity Jane, which was held to raise funds for new medical equipment for the Kent and Sussex Hospital. A proposal to build new council offices as well as a new 1,200-seat theatre in Calverley Grounds, leaving the existing town hall complex redundant, was abandoned following a change in political leadership in September 2019.

In February 2023, the council announced plans to refurbish the building and to rent out approximately two thirds of it to its partner, Town Square Spaces, who would make it available for commercial use by local businesses.
