= Benn Hall =

Coordinates: 52.3756°N 1.2643°W

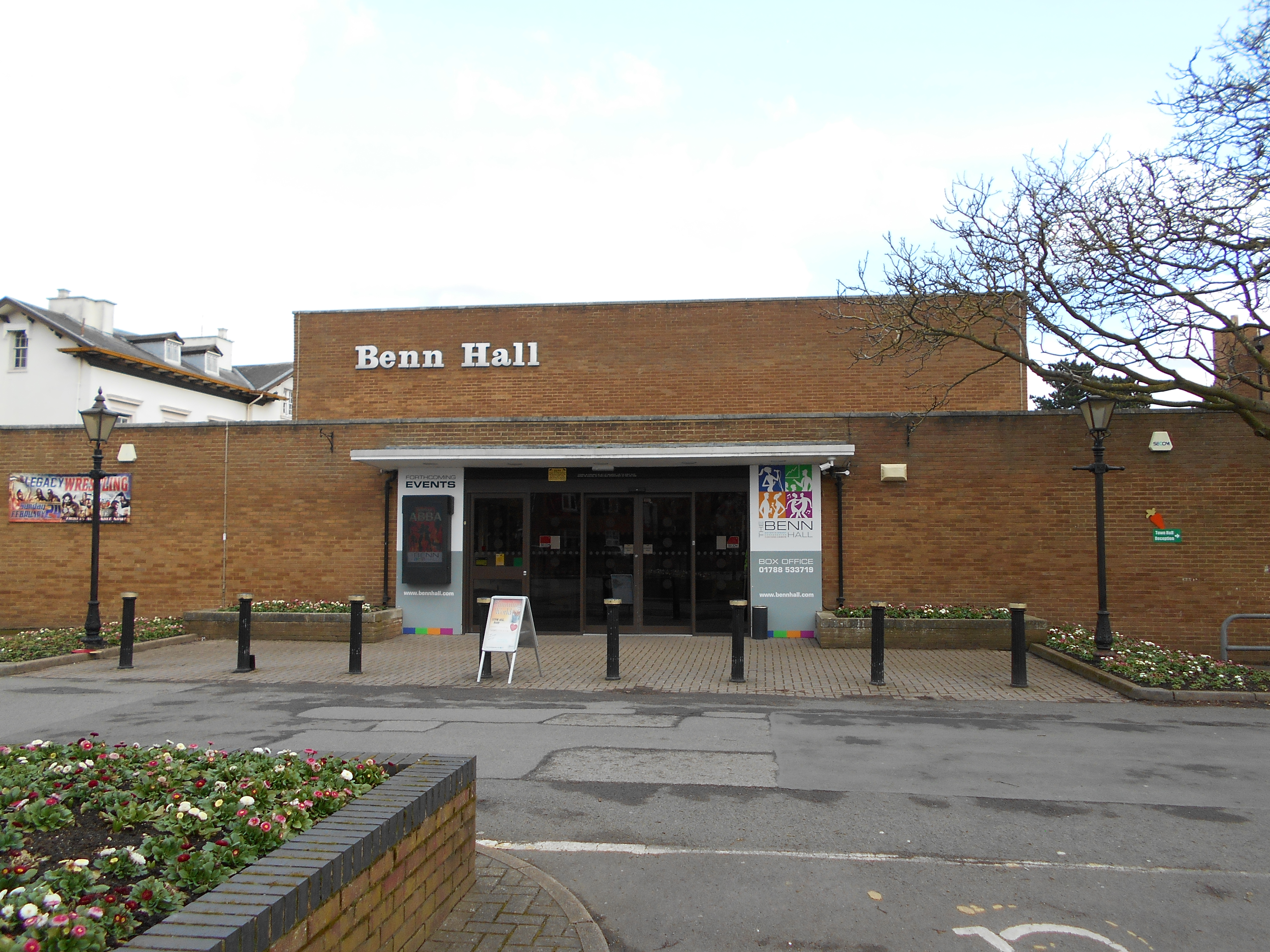
The main entrance

The Benn Hall is a conference, seminar, exhibition, concert and party venue located in Rugby, Warwickshire, England. The hall, along with the town hall which is located next to it, was opened on 5 July 1961 by Queen Elizabeth the Queen Mother. It was designed by Ernest Prestwich, and is named after George Charles Benn who in his will of 1895 left £6,000 to the local council to construct a building that would be useful to the town. The first of these buildings was opened in 1900 as a town hall. There is another Benn Hall, also dedicated to George Charles, in the village of Grandborough a few miles south of Rugby.

In the 1960s Benn Hall became renown as a venue which attracted some famous names in the world of contemporary music: Some of the acts which performed there included John Mayall & the Bluesbreakers, John Lee Hooker, The Small Faces, Pink Floyd, Status Quo, The Searchers, The Foundations, The Kinks, The Animals, and The Bee Gees. The Beatles had been booked to perform at Benn Hall in February 1963, but did not honour the date, as by then they had become national stars.

The building itself has two storeys. The main hall can hold up to 480 people, the smaller Rokeby Room 100 and the smallest room, Caldecott Room can hold 20. Dressing rooms are located beneath the main stage on the lower ground floor level and there is a bar located in the Caldecott Room. Parking for the hall is found in the pay and display car park next to it and Caldecott Park is to the rear of the hall.
