= Butty =

Butty may refer to:

- Butty boat, a type of narrowboat
- Julius Butty, Canadian record producer
- Butty, diminutive of Butt
- The Butties, a cover band including actor Sam Lloyd
- A sandwich, in Northern English dialect
- A Welsh term for buddy or friend from byti a person who helped in the coal mines

== See also ==
- Batty
- Chip butty
