= Butt =

Butt may refer to:

== Literature ==
- Butt (magazine)
- The Butt, a 2008 novel by Will Self
- Der Butt, German title of The Flounder (1977), Günter Grass novel

== People ==
- Butt (surname)
- Bhat, a surname in India and Pakistan, also spelled as Butt

== Measurement ==
- Butt (unit), a measure of volume
- Butt, an English wine cask size

== Other uses ==
- Buttocks
- Butt joint, a woodworking joinery technique
- Buttstock or butt, the back part of a rifle or other firearm
- Headbutt, blow administered with the head
- Cigarette butt (or cigarette)
- Boston butt or pork butt, a shoulder cut of pork
- Water butt, a rainwater tank
- Archery butt, practice target
- Butt splice connector, a type of crimp electrical connector
- "Butt Butt", a song by Monrose from Temptation
- Butt Drugs, a former drugstore in Corydon, Indiana

== See also ==
- BUT (disambiguation)
- Butty (disambiguation)
- Butte (disambiguation)
- Butts (disambiguation)
