= BUT =

But is the adversative conjunction in English. The English word but is an argument or statement against something. An example of using the word but is: "But I don't want to go to bed!"

BUT, but or But may also refer to:

== Businesses and organizations ==
=== Universities ===
- Beijing University of Technology, Beijing, China
- Brno University of Technology, Brno, Czech Republic

=== Other businesses ===
- British United Traction, British railway equipment and trolleybus manufacturer
- BUT (retailer), a French retail store franchise

== Places ==
- But, Opole Voivodeship, a village in Poland
- Bathpalathang Airport, Bhutan (IATA code)
- Butterfly stop, a light-rail stop in Hong Kong (MTR station code)
- County of Bute, a historic county of Scotland (by Chapman code in genealogy)
- Burton-on-Trent railway station England (National rail station code)

== Other uses ==
- but-, an organic chemical name component
- But (surname), list of people so named
- "BUT"/"Aishō", a 2007 J-Pop song by Koda Kumi

== See also ==
- Butt (disambiguation)
- Butte (disambiguation)
- Butts (disambiguation)
