= La Butte =

La Butte may refer to:

- La Butte-aux-Cailles in Paris' 13th arrondissement
- a lieu-dit in Ledringhem, Nord, France
- a place in Vix Grave, an archaeological site in Burgundy, France

== See also ==
- Butte (disambiguation)
