= Rugby Town Hall =

Municipal building in Rugby, Warwickshire, England

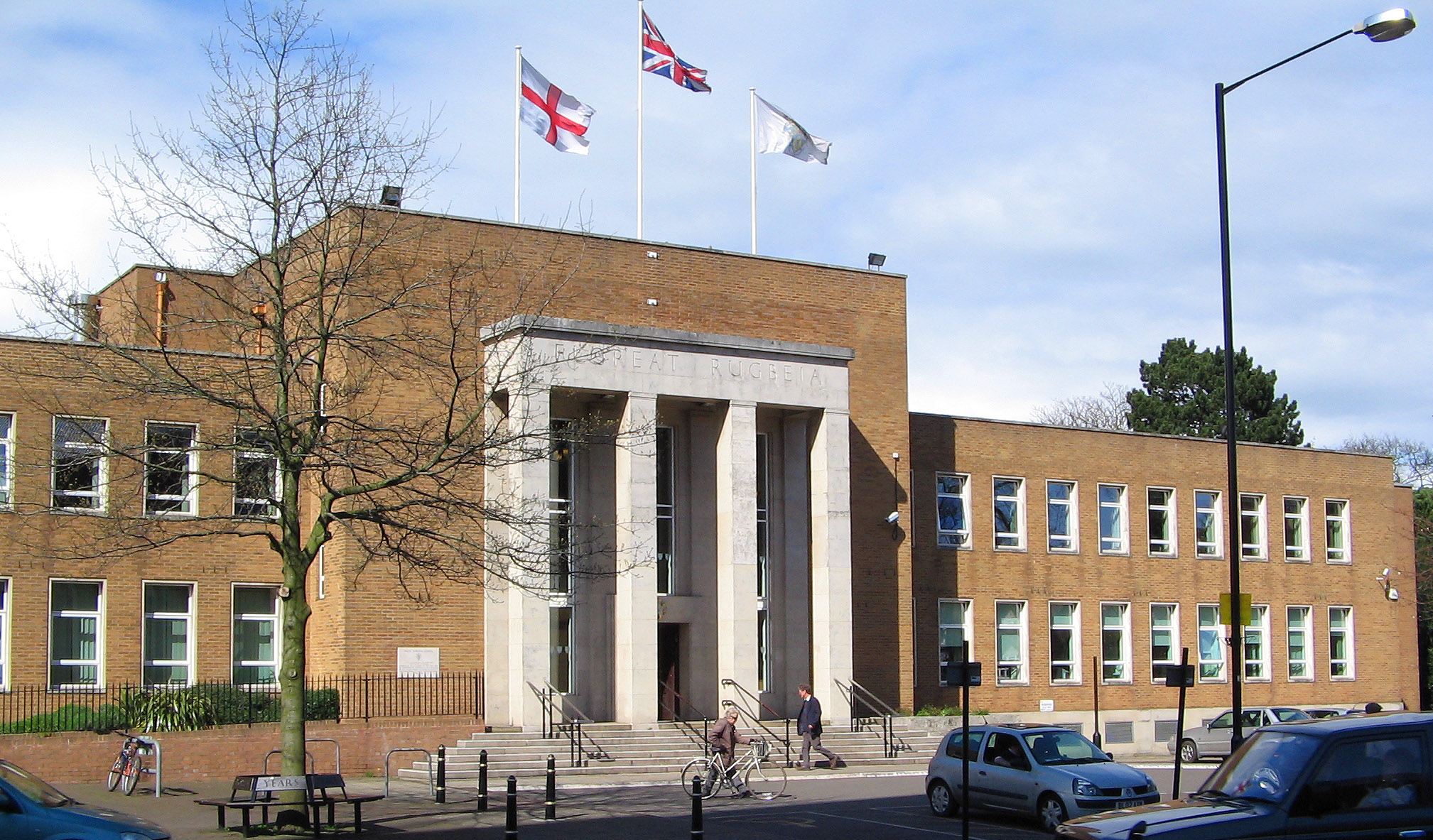
- Rugby Town Hall
- Interactive map of the Rugby Town Hall area

General information
- Architectural style: Neo-Georgian
- Location: Evreux Way, Rugby, Warwickshire
- Coordinates: 52.375337°N 1.263575°W
- Inaugurated: 1961
- Owner: Rugby Borough Council

Design and construction
- Architect: Ernest Prestwich

Rugby Town Hall is a municipal building on Evreux Way in the town centre of Rugby, Warwickshire, England. The building is the headquarters of Rugby Borough Council.

== History ==
=== Previous town halls ===
Two previous town halls existed on High Street: The first one was built in 1857, designed by Edward Welby Pugin and James Murray, This town hall was built by a private company for profit, and was multi-purpose, containing indoor markets, shops, an assembly room, a library, and a room for official business by the County Court and Magistrates. An extension was made in 1919. This building was not used by the local council however, who had their offices on Windmill Lane until 1900. In 1906, the building was sold to a theatrical company, and in 1911 it was converted into a cinema called Vint's Palace of Varieties. Most of the building except for the extension was destroyed by a fire in 1921, and was replaced by a building which was until 2009 a Woolworths shop.

The second Town Hall, this one being a municipal building which housed the local council dated from 1900, in a building constructed using money left in the will of George Charles Benn, who in his will of 1895 left £6,000 to the local council to construct a building that would be useful to the town. It was constructed on the site of the former ‘Shoulder of Mutton Inn’. It was used by the council until 1937, when they moved to an early 19th century property known as "The Lawn" on Newbold Road, and the second town hall was converted into a Marks and Spencer shop, which it remained until 2015.

=== Current Town Hall ===
After civic leaders found that "The Lawn" was inadequate for their needs, they elected to construct a purpose-built facility. In December 1937 the borough council approved the design of a new town hall, made by Ernest Prestwich of J.C. Prestwich & Sons, at an estimated cost of £90,478 (equivalent to £5,099,896.15 in 2023), in spite of objections as to cost. By the end of the year, plans were being modified to lower the cost. However, by November 1938 no foundation stone had been laid, the council and populace were still arguing about the cost of the scheme, and a ministerial inquiry was held in relation to the required loans. Prestwich was the only witness called, to "explain details of the scheme". The Rugby Advertiser devoted a whole page to the matter.

Ultimately, the work was postponed by the Second World War, and construction was delayed until work started in June 1959. Adjoining it to the north is a functions venue called Benn Hall which was built at the same time. Both the "New Town Hall" and the Benn Hall were opened on 5 July 1961 by Queen Elizabeth The Queen Mother. The town hall consists of two brick neo-Georgian wings, fronted by a white stone entrance portico, the top of which is inscribed with the borough motto "Floreat Rugbeia", Latin for "May Rugby Flourish".

The architecture historian Nikolaus Pevsner did not hold a favourable view of the town hall, describing it as "quite dead architecturally".

During 1984-85 the town hall made the national news when it was the scene of protests against Rugby council's controversial decision to remove the words ‘sexual orientation’ from their Equal Opportunities policy. This was widely interpreted as a 'ban on gays' and caused uproar, and led to large protests from gay rights campaigners and politicians, including the MP Chris Smith, who used the occasion to choose to "come out" as Britain's first gay MP. The council eventually bowed to pressure to reverse the decision in early 1985.

A bronze sculpture commemorating Sir Frank Whittle, the "Father of the Jet Engine", was installed at Chestnut Field just outside the town hall in 2005.

In more recent times solar panels were installed on the roof of the building.

== Gallery ==
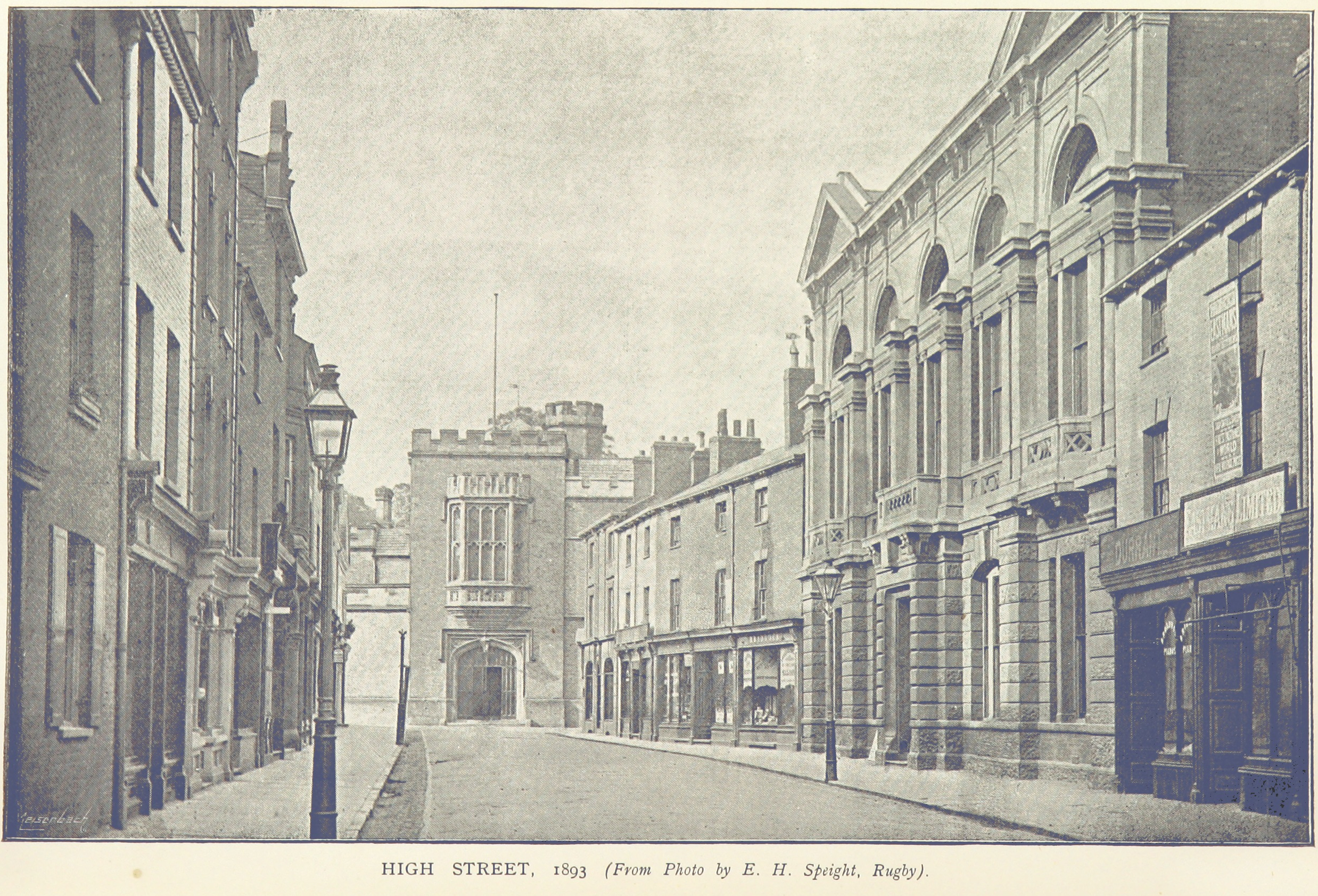
Rugby High Street in 1893, the building second to the right was the first Town Hall of 1857. Destroyed by fire in 1921.

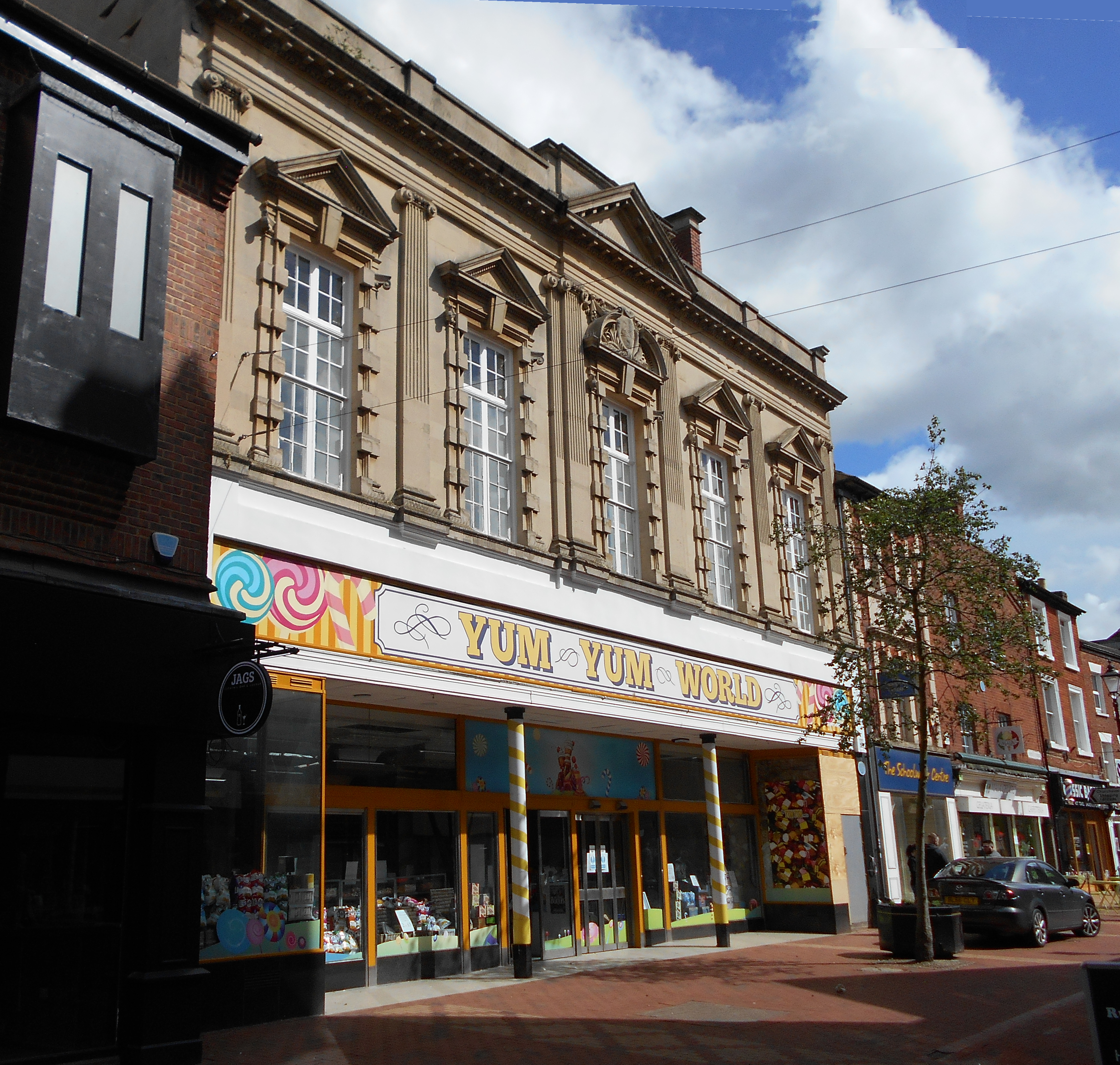
The second Town Hall of 1900, on the opposite side of High Street, now in use as a shop.

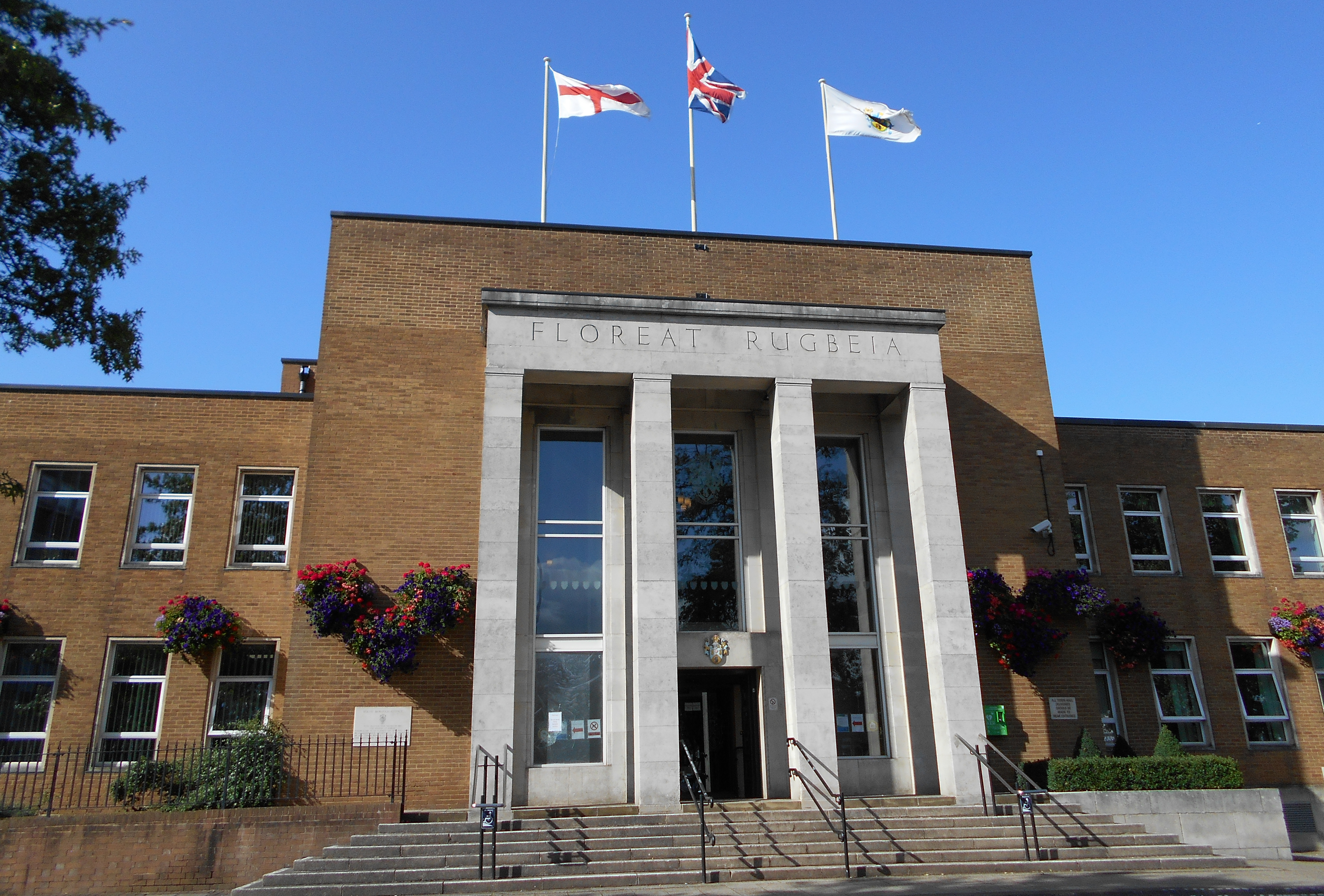
Close-up of current Town Hall portico.

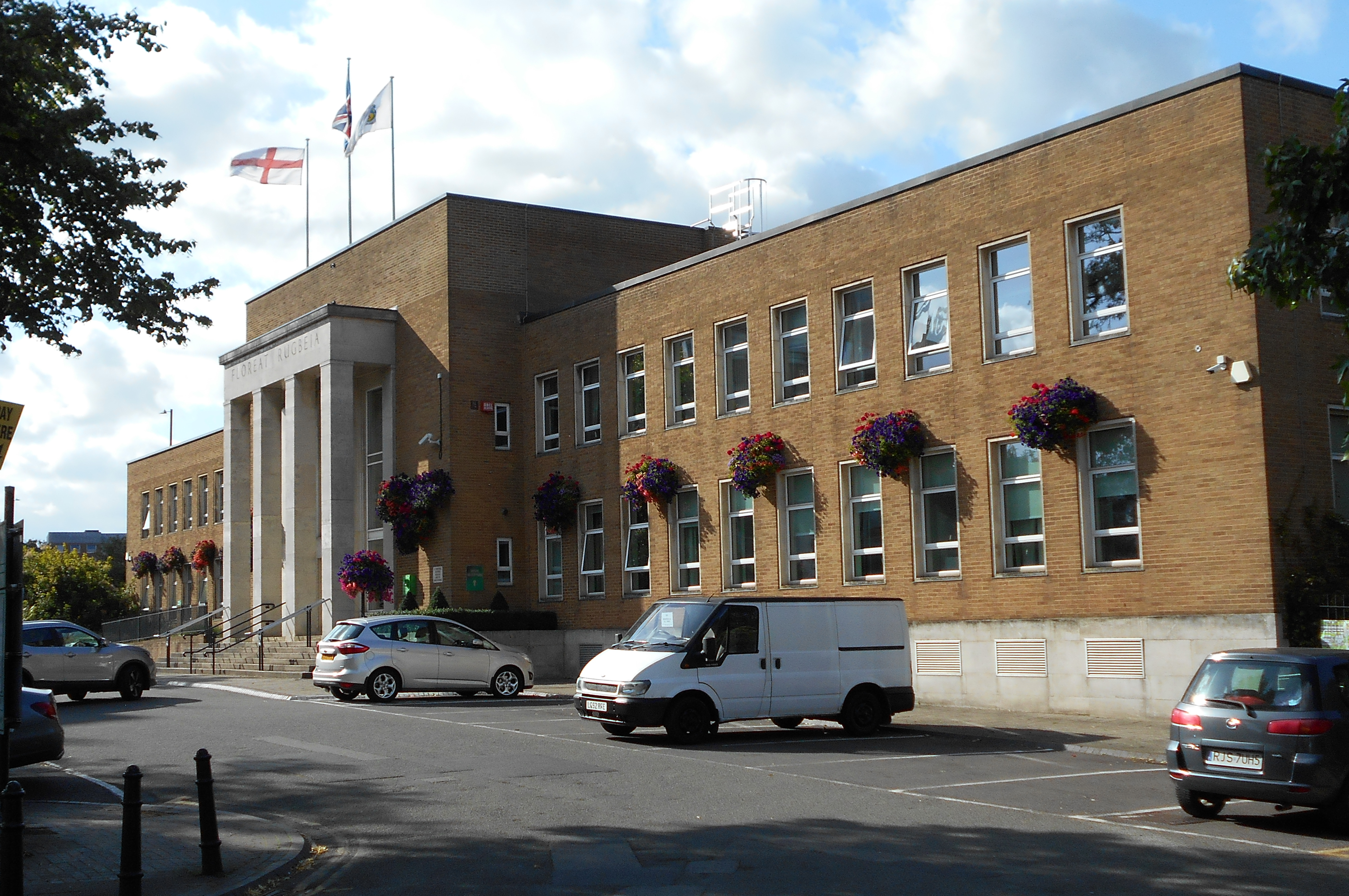
View from east

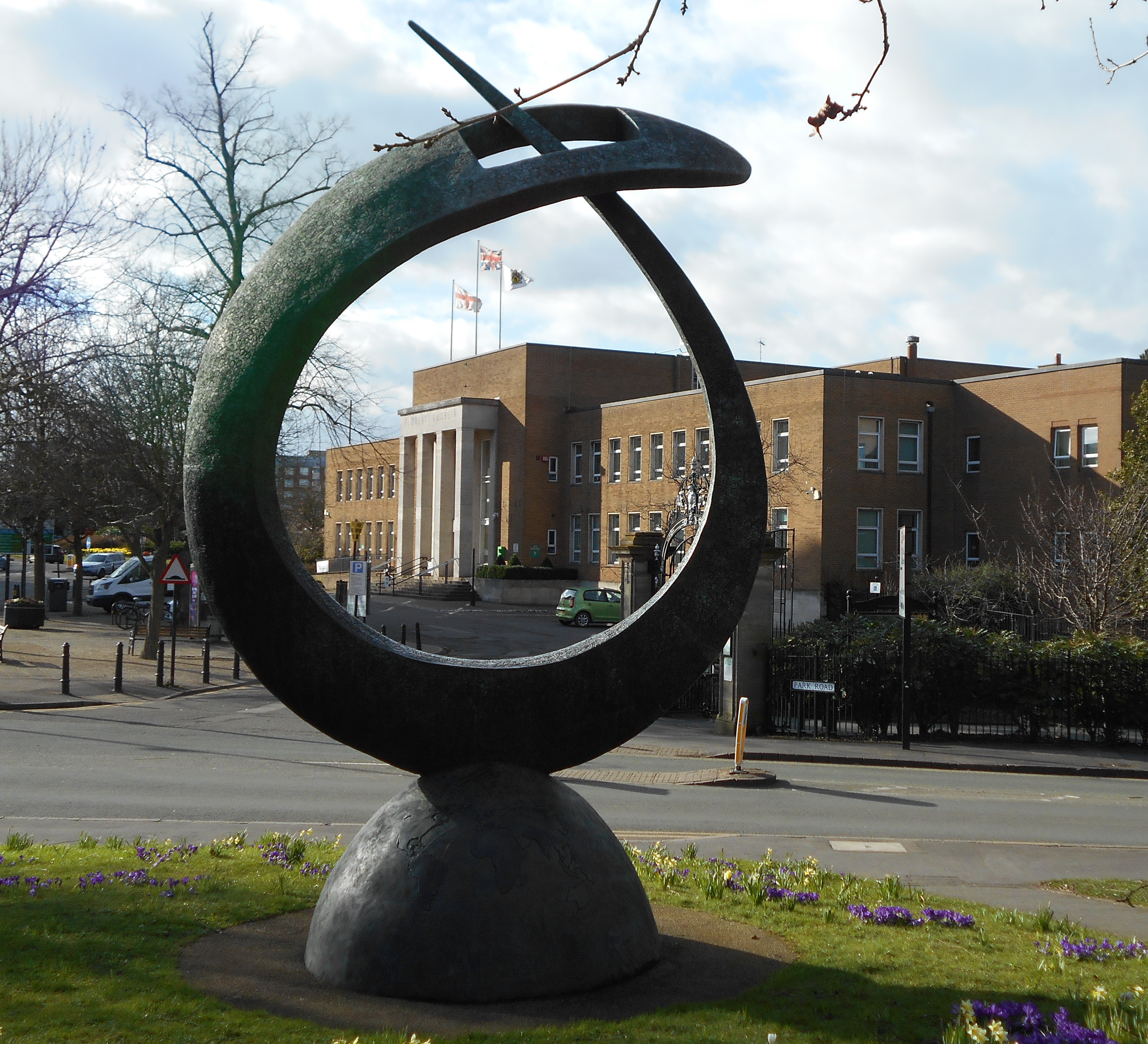
The Town Hall seen through the nearby Whittle memorial.
