= Salford Civic Centre =

Municipal building in Swinton, Greater Manchester, England

The Civic Centre
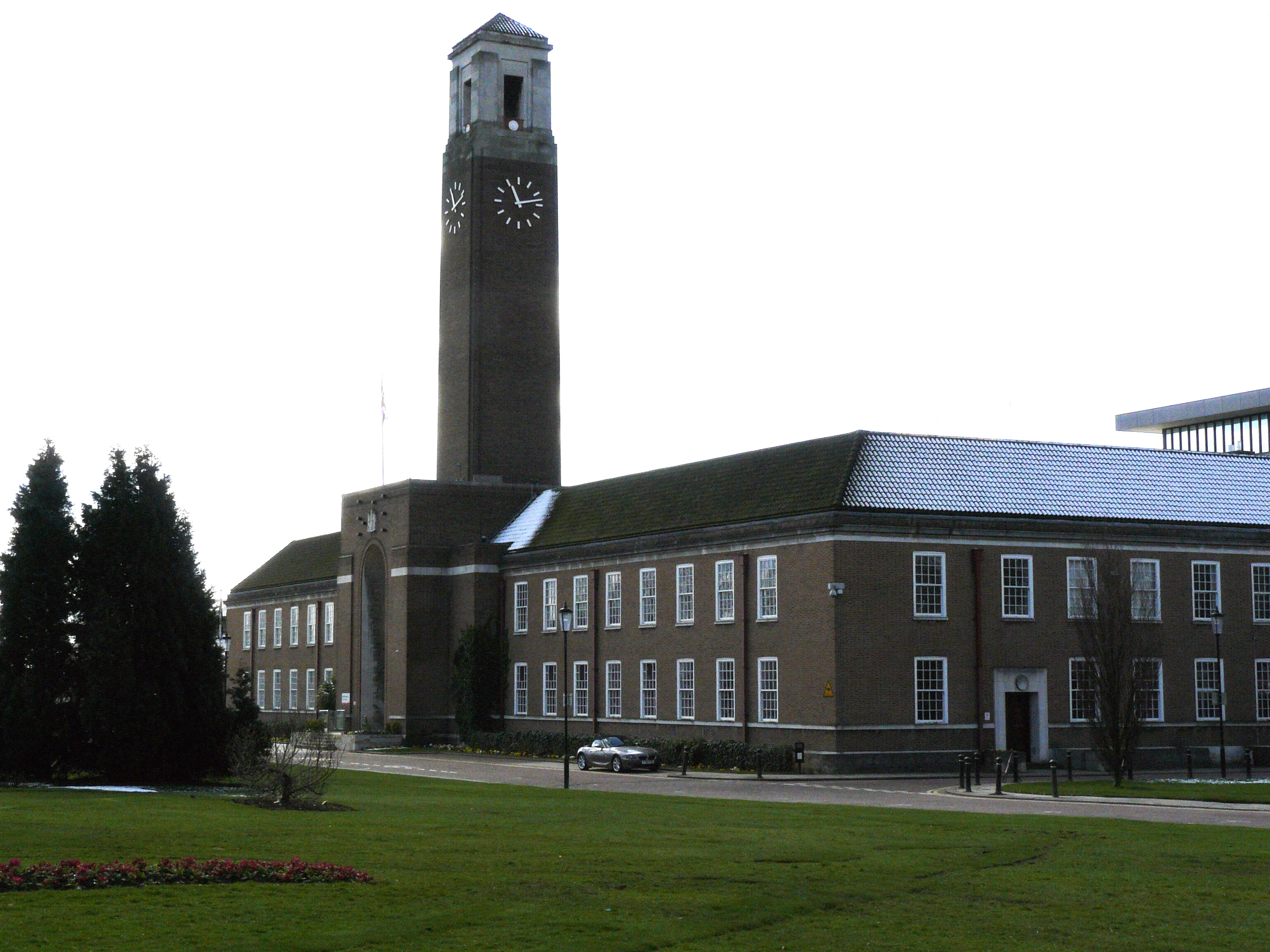
- Salford Civic Centre
- Former names: Swinton and Pendlebury Town Hall

General information
- Architectural style: Neo-Classical
- Location: Swinton, City of Salford
- Coordinates: 53.5111°N 2.3398°W
- Construction started: 17 October 1936
- Completed: 1938
- Cost: £80,000
- Owner: Salford City Council
- Height: 125 feet

Design and construction
- Architect(s): Percy Thomas and Ernest Prestwich

Salford Civic Centre, formerly Swinton and Pendlebury Town Hall, is a municipal building at Chorley Road, in Swinton, Greater Manchester, England. It is the administrative headquarters of Salford City Council.

== History ==
The Swinton and Pendlebury Urban District Council, which had been formed in 1894, had used Victoria House in Victoria Park as their meeting place. (Note: Victoria House dated back at least to the early 19th century; after being re-built in 1862, it was acquired by the council in 1896 and served as council offices until 1938 and then as an adult education centre until it was demolished in 1993.) However, after the council became a municipal borough in 1934, it decided to seek larger premises.

The site selected on Chorley Road in Swinton had previously been occupied by Swinton Industrial School. (Note: The local industrial school, which had responsibility for educating local paupers, was opened in 1843; it was visited by Charles Dickens in July 1850, was closed in 1925 and was demolished in 1933.) The foundation stone for the new town hall was laid by the mayor on 17 October 1936. The new building was designed by architects Percy Thomas and Ernest Prestwich in the neo-classical style after they had won a national design competition. It was built by J. Gerrard and Sons at a cost of £80,000 and officially opened by the Deputy Leader of the Labour Party, Arthur Greenwood MP, on 17 September 1938. Percy Thomas was awarded the Royal Institute of British Architects (RIBA) Gold Medal for his work in 1939. The most striking feature of the design was the clock tower, 125 feet (38 m) in height, with clock faces on each side, 9 feet (2.7 m) in diameter. The clock was by Potts of Leeds; a master clock drove all the clocks in the building.

A glass-walled computer centre was built to the south-east of the town hall, in order to cope with increased administration requirements, and completed in July 1973. Following the implementation of the Local Government Act 1972, Swinton and Pendlebury Town Hall, being one of the most modern town halls in the enlarged local authority area, became the meeting place of the enlarged local authority, known as the Salford City Council, in 1974. The council chamber was re-modelled at that time so that it was capable of accommodating a larger number of councillors.

A four-story extension located to the south-west of the town hall, which was designed by Cruickshank and Sewards and built by Fairclough Fram Gerrard, was inspected by the Duke of Edinburgh during construction and completed in the late 1970s. The City Treasury Building, also known as "Unity House", was built by John Laing Group and officially opened by the Shadow Chief Secretary to the Treasury, Margaret Beckett MP, on 9 October 1991.

Following the closure of Kingslea House on Barton Road in 2007, the East Wing of the civic centre became the local register office and as well a venue for weddings and civil partnerships.

In July 2020, during the COVID-19 pandemic, a mural depicting Salford's key workers, which had been painted by an anonymous artist, was left on the steps of the civic centre: council officials decided that it would be put on public display.
