= Butts Close =

Park in Hitchin, Hertfordshire, England

Coordinates: 51°57′08″N 00°17′00″W

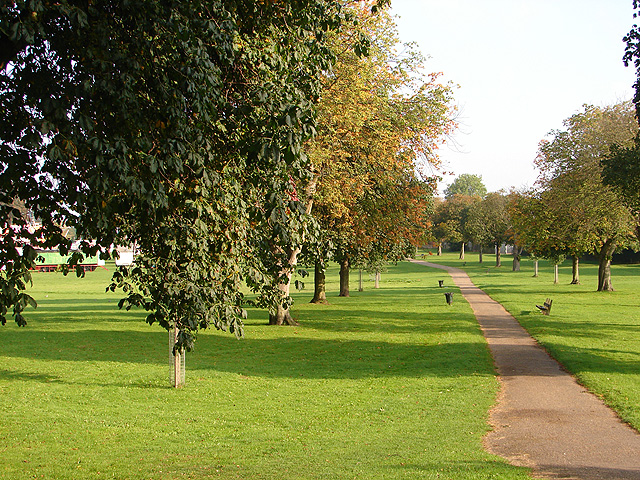
Butts Close

Butts Close is an 11-acre (45,000 m^{2}) park in the town of Hitchin, Hertfordshire that used to once be a sporting ground for archery. Claimed to be the oldest open space in Hitchin, the name refers to the archery butts that used to be on it during the Late medieval and Tudor times. During those years it was much larger but in the last centuries buildings such as a leisure centre and grammar school have been built on it. The remaining Butts Close is still used for modern fêtes and other special occasions though.

The park is divided into two areas. The western area is an open cut grassland used for outdoor recreation activities such as fitness classes. The eastern counterpart is a nature preserve with a wildlife pond, alder trees and a large weeping willow.

== Facts and events ==
Henry VIII used to practice archery at Butts Close when he visited Hitchin.

Buffalo Bill's Wild West Show visited Butts Close in 1904.

Between WWI and WWII, on the north side of Butts Close there was sited a tank, allegedly "Fearless" but actually a different model from the real "Fearless," and a 16cm German Howitzer. They were popular play areas for local children, but were taken away just before World War II and scrapped.

The park was the recipient of a tree planting honoring Queen Elizabeth's platinum jubilee in 2022.
