= Bute Building =

University building in Cardiff, Wales

Coordinates: 51.48652°N 3.18264°W

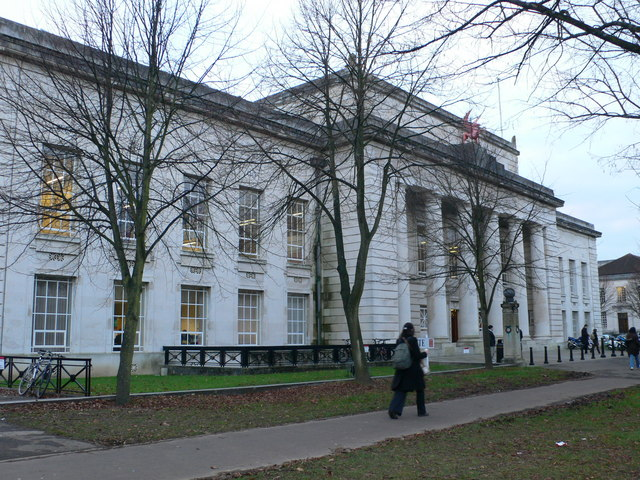
Bute Building

The Bute Building (Welsh: Adeilad Bute) is a Cardiff University building in Cathays Park, Cardiff, Wales. It houses the Welsh School of Architecture. It is a Grade II listed building.

The neoclassical building was designed by architects Percy Thomas and Ivor Jones, who won a competition in 1911 to design a building for Cardiff Technical College. The foundations of the building were laid in 1913 and the building opened in 1916. The building has six Roman Doric columns in the front of the building and includes the Birt Acres Lecture Theatre. The design has been called "disappointingly conventional"

In 1962 the Technical college became the Welsh College of Advanced Technology and in 1968 the Bute Building became the main building of the University of Wales Institute of Science and Technology (UWIST). It now houses the Welsh School of Architecture and the School of Journalism, Media and Cultural Studies. It also contained two libraries, the Bute Library and Architecture Library.

The UK's largest Sky Dome, an artificial sky 8 metres in diameter run by the School of Architecture and used for daylight modelling and sun-path studies, is located in the basement of the building.
