= Butte County =

Butte County may refer to:

- Butte County, California
- Butte County, Idaho
- Box Butte County, Nebraska
- Butte County, South Dakota
