= John Butte =

John Butte may refer to:

- John Butte (MP for Gloucester) (fl. 1366), MP for Gloucester
- John But (fl. 1402–1425), or Butte, MP for Bodmin, Barnstaple, Liskeard and Truro

== See also ==
- Big John Butte, mountain in Montana
