= Ernest Prestwich =

English architect

Ernest Prestwich F.R.I.B.A.
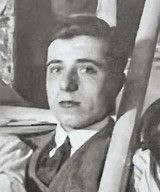
- Prestwich as a university student, 1911
- Born: 29 August 1889; Leigh, Lancashire, England
- Died: 4 November 1977 (aged 88); Southport, Lancashire, England
- Education: University of Liverpool School of Architecture
- Occupation: Architect
- Parent: James Caldwell Prestwich
- Practice: J.C. Prestwich & Sons
- Buildings: Salford Civic Centre, Tunbridge Wells Town Hall, Rugby Town Hall

Signature
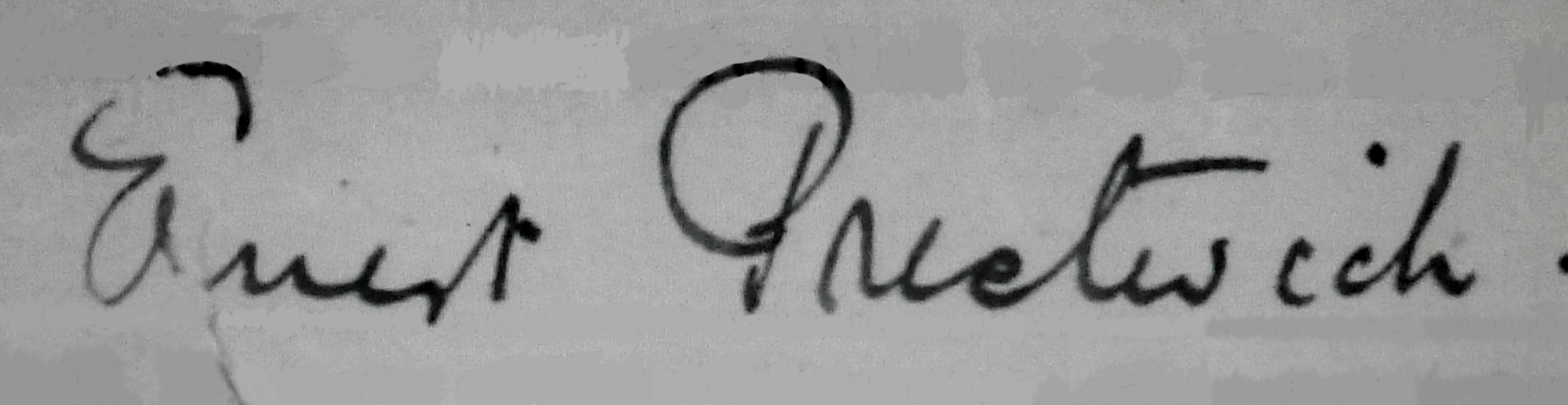

Ernest Prestwich (29 August 1889 – 4 November 1977) was an English architect, working his own interpretation of Classical architecture, via the Style Moderne, Modernist and Brutalist styles. He specialised in war memorials and civic buildings, many of which are listed buildings. Some of his designs were independently-designed projects, and some were co-designs with colleagues. He was a partner with his father James Caldwell Prestwich and his brother Harold in Prestwich & Sons. and he also worked under his own name, and with Percy Thomas in various civic building design competitions.

== Background ==
Prestwich was born into an architectural background. His father was James Caldwell Prestwich, and his mother was Georgina née Slade or Webb. (Note: Georgina Matilda Slade or Georgina Webb (1853 or 1854 – 1934). GRO index: Births Dec 1853 Slade Georgina Tetbury 6a 267 or Births Mar 1854 Webb Georgina Chippenham 5a 53. Deaths Dec 1934 Prestwich Georgina 80 Leigh 8c 208. Marriages Dec 1880 Prestwich James Caldwell and Webb Georgina, Chippenham 5a 123.) His brothers were architect Harold Oswald Prestwich, (Note: Harold Oswald Prestwich (1881 - 7 October 1952). GRO index: Births Dec 1881 Prestwich Harold Oswald Leigh 8c 238 Deaths Dec 1952 Prestwich Harold O. 70 Bolton 10b 609.) architect Lewyn James Prestwich, (Note: Lewyn James Prestwich (18 April 1883 – 5 April 1963). GRO index: Births Jun 1883 Prestwich Lewyn James Leigh 8c 279. He emigrated to the United States in 1906, worked as an architectural inspector, and died in Los Angeles.) and Ministry of Labour clerk Herbert Webb Prestwich. (Note: Herbert Webb Prestwich (6 July 1887 – 9 March 1962). GRO index: Births Sep 1887 Prestwich Herbert Webb Leigh 8c 275. Deaths Mar 1962 Prestwich Herbert W. 74 Wigan 10f 1095.)

Prestwich was born on 29 August 1889, in Leigh, Lancashire. (Note: Ernest Prestwich (1889–1977): GRO index: Births Dec 1889 Prestwich Ernest Leigh, mother Webb, 8c 273. Deaths Dec 1977 Prestwich Ernest 29AU1889 Southport 37 0375) In 1891, he was living at 61 Church Street, Leigh, with his parents, his elder brothers Harold and Herbert, and a servant. By 1901 the family had moved to 73 St Helen's Road, Leigh. He does not appear on the 1911 census.

After attending Manchester Grammar School, he was accepted at the University of Liverpool School of Architecture, and studied there between 1906 and 1912, gaining his Bachelor of Arts with first class honours in architecture in 1910, and Master of Arts in 1912. According to the Liverpool Daily Post, Prestwich was "one of the school's best students shortly before the war ... obtaining several distinctions, including the Holt Travelling Scholarship". He also won the Ronald P. Jones Scholarship "for the study of architecture in Rome". The 1921 census finds Prestwich at age 30, living with his parents and working in Leigh with his father. Between 1923 and 1939, Prestwich was based in Leigh.

Prestwich was living at 2 Bamber Gardens, Southport, Lancashire, when he died on 4 November 1977. He left £171,573 net (equivalent to £1,008,042.24 in 2025).

== Career ==
Plan of Port Sunlight, drawn by Prestwich, 1910

Between 1912 and 1965, Prestwich was an employee and then a partner in his father's and brother's company J.C. Prestwich & Son, which in 1922 became Prestwich & Sons. He was also for a while an employee of Lever Brothers, working under James Lomax-Simpson in the company's architectural department. There he collaborated on a project in Stornoway where he designed alterations to the ballroom of Lews Castle, including an "Adam-style ceiling", and other works in Cheshire and Thornton Hough. In 1912, Prestwich published a substantial article in the Leigh Chronicle and Weekly District Advertiser on the subject of the Housing, Town Planning, etc. Act 1909, explaining and elaborating on its potential benefit to the Leigh town council and the residents of the town.

Prestwich remained a partner of J.C. Prestwich & Sons, while working under the company name, as an individual architect, and as a design-competition partner of Percy Thomas. At the same time he took additional tasks. In 1936 he was appointed as "consultant in relation to the architectural features of the Central Baths to be erected at Clare Hall, Halifax". In 1932 he was appointed to the jury panel which chose the winner of West Yorkshire's Best Building Medal Award for that year. In 1939 he was made a panel architect, appointed to survey buildings in his locality in respect of protective measures during the Second World War.

Early in his career, while still a student, Prestwich was the winner of a 1910 competition "to plan the completion of W. H. Lever's model village at Port Sunlight". He was awarded a total of £120 (equivalent to £8,147.36 in 2025) for winning the competition and for the use of the plan by Lever. The Builder published his designs, which were also exhibited at the Royal Academy in the same year. A number of his architectural briefs for civic buildings, war memorials and churches were won by competition. Besides being a competitor in building design competitions, Prestwich was also a recommended architect-assessor in such competitions. Explaining his use of the Style Moderne, Prestwich said that:

There is not the money usually nowadays for an ornate building in a small place ... the ornate, highly decorative town hall of former years [is] no longer wanted.

=== War service ===
Prestwich served as a private in the Royal Army Service Corps. He disembarked in France on 5 September 1915, according to his medal index card. Later, he was an acting sergeant in the Royal Engineers. He was demobilised from the army, and transferred to Class Z Reserve on 21 February 1919.

He was organising the building of external air raid shelters for the schools of Widnes, and calling for builders and contractors, in 1941.

== General works ==
Prestwich designed the Cinematograph Theatre, Railway Road, Leigh, Lancashire, in 1912, It was completed in 1913. The Midland Bank Building, or DIC building, Cross Street, Manchester, was designed in 1923, and opened in 1925. Prestwich designed an extension to Leigh Infirmary and a new Nurses' Home, in Leigh, Lancashire, in 1925. He designed public baths for Campbell Square, Northampton, which was completed in 1933. Portsmouth Civic Centre was designed by Prestwich with Percy Thomas in 1934. (Note: There appears to be no record of such a building designed by Prestwich and Thomas, so the Portsmouth Civic Centre design was possibly an unbuilt entry in a design competition.)

In 1936, Prestwich designed the Central Swimming Baths, Eastgate and New York Road, Leeds, Yorkshire. He won a prize of £350 (equivalent to £21,386.82 in 2025) in the design competition for this work The proposal for this design included capability of conversion of the pool area to a hall accommodating 5,000 persons, at a budget of £110,000 (equivalent to £6,721,572.45 in 2025). The building was expected to "house not only the biggest swimming pool but the largest public hall in the city".

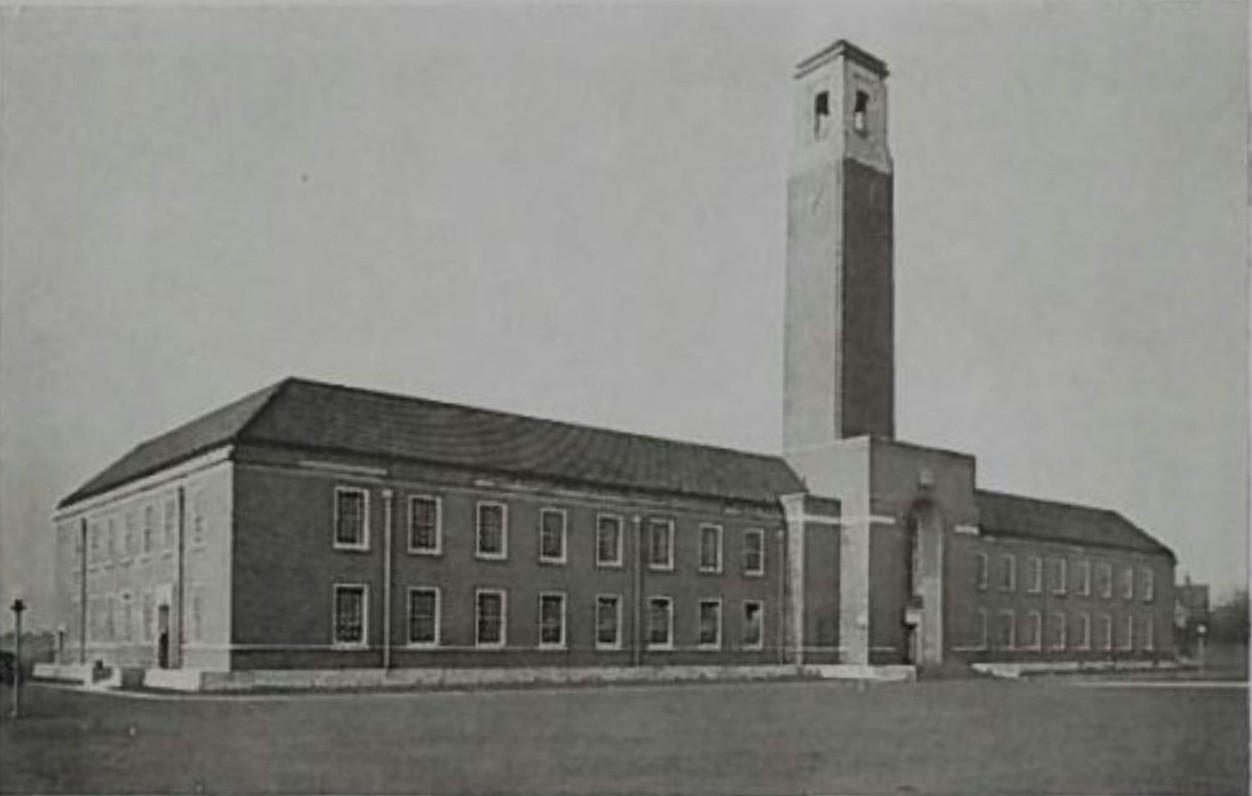
Salford Civic Centre, 1937

Swinton Town Hall was co-designed by Prestwich with Percy Thomas. They won the design competition in September 1934, and the building was opened in 1938. It was renamed as Salford Civic Centre in 1974. The building was designed with a public hall, petty sessions court, public library and municipal offices, besides committee rooms, a council chamber, and administrative offices. The exterior is of "brick with Portland stone dressings", and includes a clock tower.

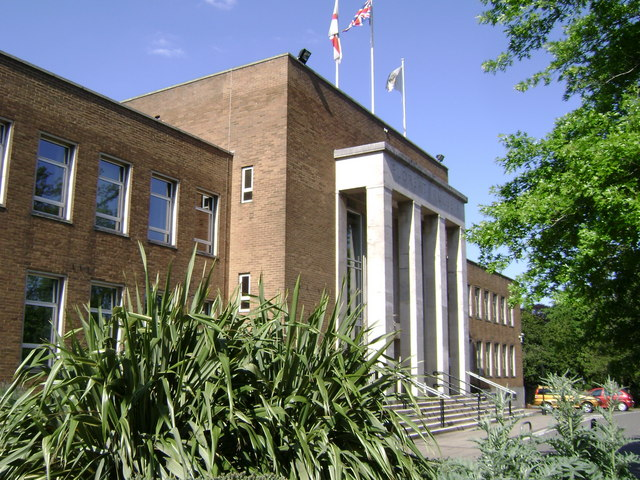
Rugby Town Hall, 1961 (designed 1937)

Prestwich designed and supervised the building of the civic centre at Rugby, now known as Rugby Town Hall, in 1936. In that year, the R.I.B.A. recommended six architects for the job, and Prestwich was chosen by the reputation of his previous plans for Swinton, Pendlebury, Northampton, Tunbridge Wells and Leigh. The civic centre plans included the Benn Memorial Hall, intended to seat 1,500. In December 1937 Prestwich's plan was approved, at an estimated £90,478 (equivalent to £5,328,844.97 in 2025), in spite of objections as to cost. By the end of the year, plans were being modified to lower the cost. However, by November 1938 no foundation stone had been laid, the council and populace were still arguing about the cost of the scheme, and a ministerial inquiry was held in relation to the required loans. Prestwich was the only witness called, to "explain details of the scheme". The Rugby Advertiser devoted a whole page to the matter. It was ultimately completed to the original design and opened as the "New Town Hall" on 5 July 1961 by Queen Elizabeth The Queen Mother.

Pendlebury Town Hall, Salford, Lancashire, was designed by Prestwich, with Percy Thomas, and was completed in 1938. Prestwich also designed a secondary school at Hope Hall, Eccles Old Road, Salford, which was completed in 1939. He designed the Police Headquarters at Halton, Preston, Lancashire. It was completed in 1939. In 1940, Prestwich was calling for tenders to build a new parish hall for the Speke housing estate in Liverpool.

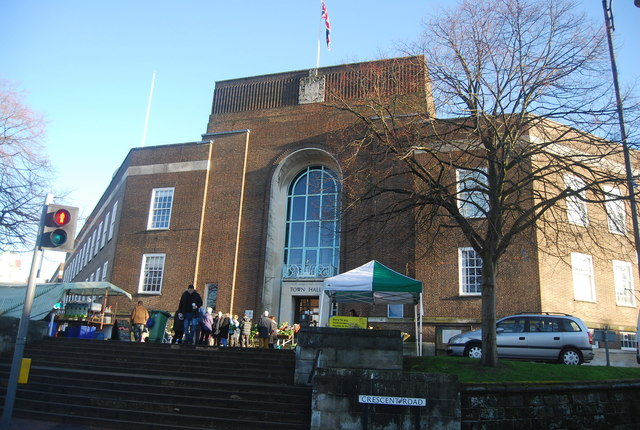
Tunbridge Wells Town Hall, 1939

Tunbridge Wells Civic Complex comprises several listed buildings. It includes Tunbridge Wells Town Hall, and was initiated as a design competition which was won in November 1934 by Prestwich and Percy Thomas, Much of it was completed in 1939, with the town hall being opened in 1941. An initial drawing by Prestwich and Thomas was published in the Kent & Sussex Courier in November 1934. When the design competition was won, the estimated total cost of this complex and the town hall complex was £157,550 18s 5d (equivalent to £9,749,033.65 in 2025). The cost later rose to £200,000 (equivalent to £12,375,737.53 in 2025) and comprised a library, fire station, police courts, public assembly hall, and municipal buildings.

Tunbridge Wells assembly hall was opened on 24 May 1939 by Lady Joan Marion Pratt, Marchioness Camden, wife of the Lord Lieutenant of Kent. It was built between 1934 and 1939, and is a listed building in its own right. The group of Tunbridge Wells police station, courts and library, completed in 1939, comprises two listed buildings. The style is described by English Heritage as "Neo-Georgian style with Moderne details". The buildings are in "brown brick with reconstituted stone dressings". The middle window of the library and museum is larger than the rest, and has a bas relief of Ancient Greek gods above, and a door within the window. Inside that building is a "large well staircase with stylised Greek key design to cornice". The police station and courts building is also in brown brick, but has Portland stone dressings. Its bronze main doors have above them a "semicircular tympanum with classical figures with scales of justice and motto, do well doubt not.

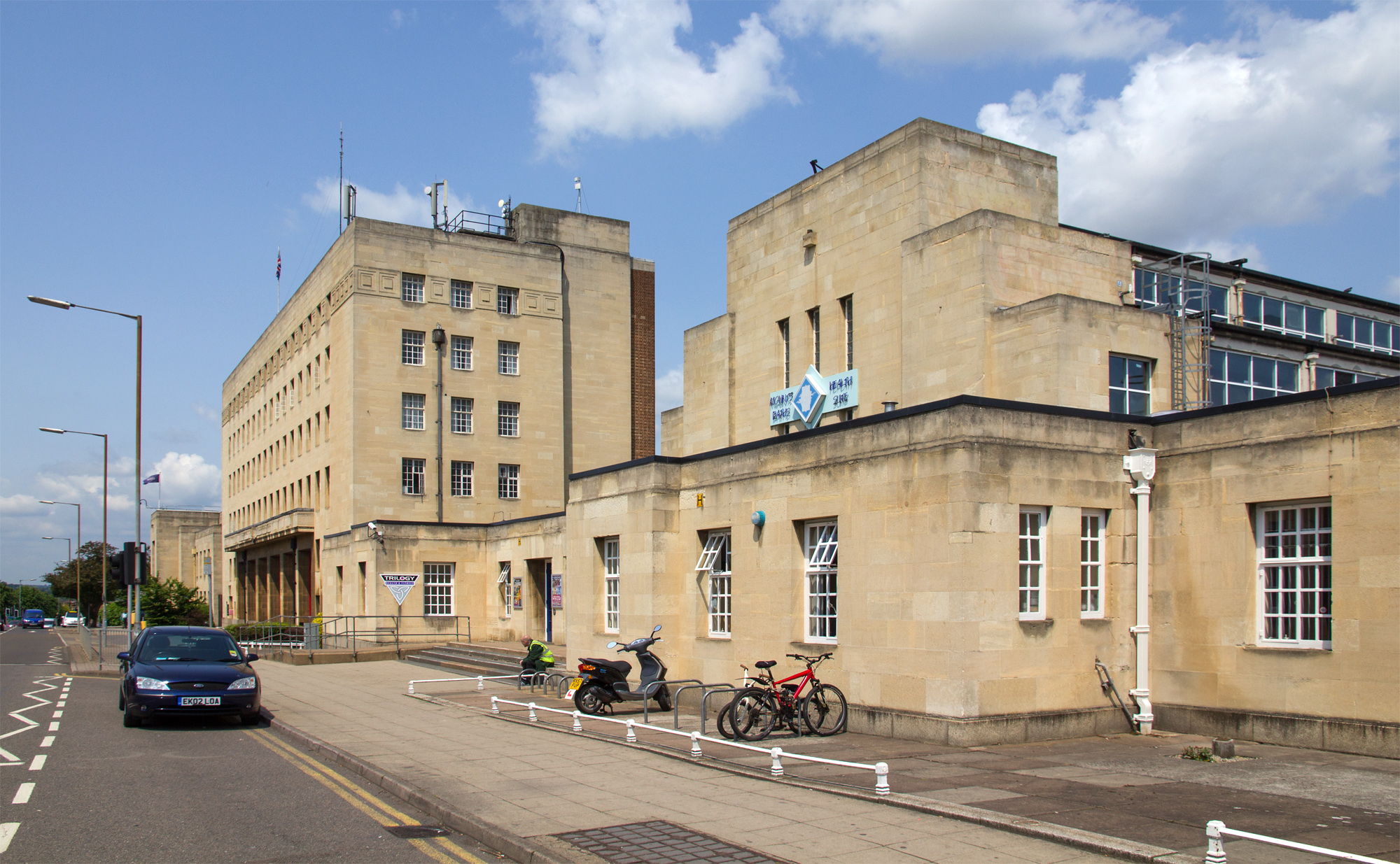
Civic buildings, Northampton, 1934–1936

The Mounts group comprises a listed building. Northampton Police and Fire Stations and Courts were designed by Prestwich as a civic centre in 1931 and completed in 1935. He designed and completed Mounts Baths at Northampton in 1936, although one source suggests that all of these buildings were constructed between 1938 and 1941. The baths were opened formally by Lord Burghley, the Olympic medallist, and Prestwich gave him a presentation at the opening.

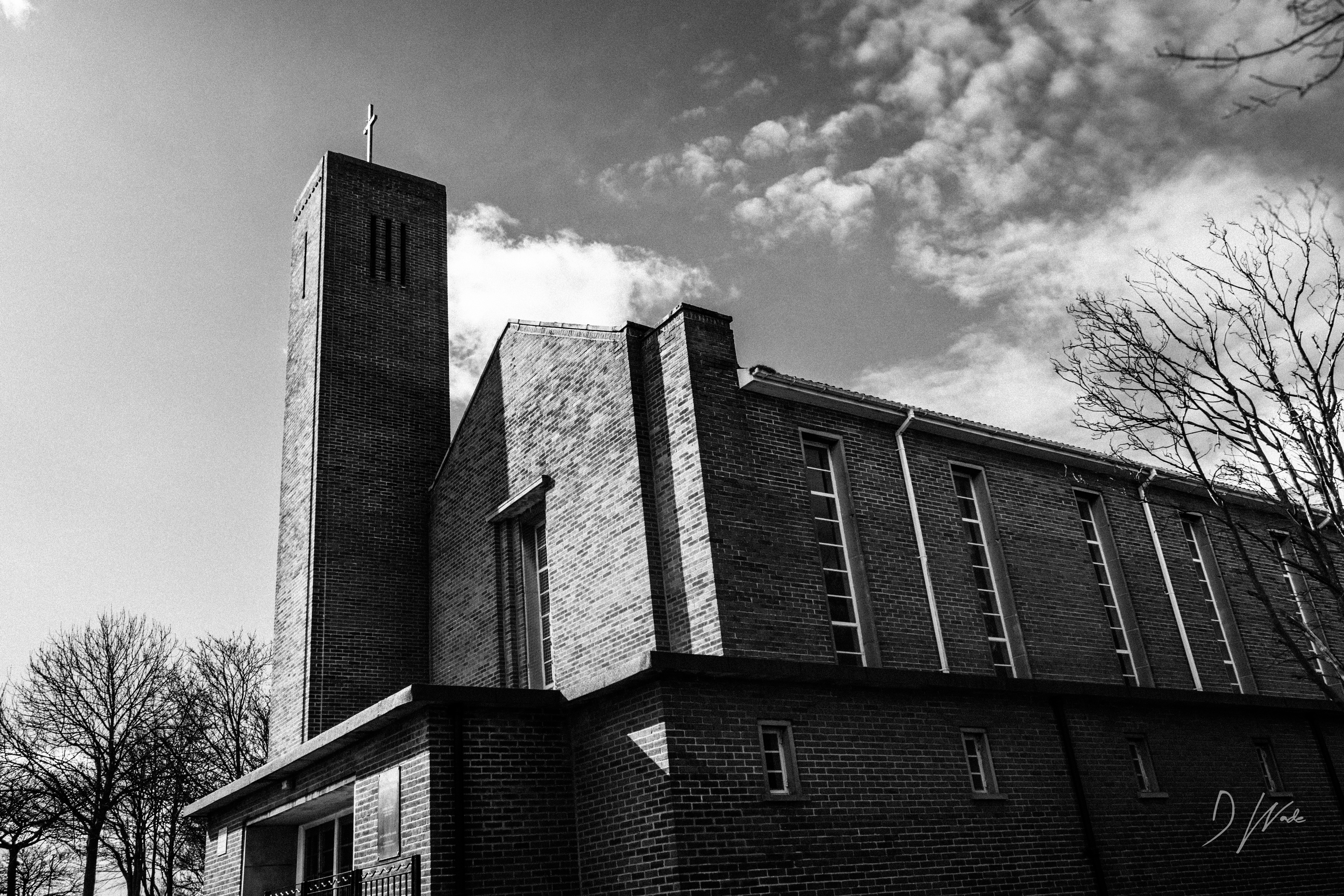
Peterlee Memorial Methodist Church, 1958

In the 1950s, Prestwich was designing churches. Didsbury Methodist Church, Parrs Wood Road, Didsbury, was designed by Prestwich and opened in October 1954. Peterlee Memorial Church, a Methodist church, was designed by Prestwich, and built between 1957 and 1958. Prestwich designed the Methodist church at Court Hey, Broadgreen, Liverpool, and it was opened when he was in his 69th year, on 19 July 1958, However it was demolished in 1966 to make way for the M62 motorway. One of Prestwich's last designs was The Manse, for the Methodist Church, Bonner Road, Bethnal Green, London. It was completed in 1959. Knowsley House, designed by Prestwich at an unknown date, is a former office building. It now houses shops on Deansgate and Knowsley Street, Bolton.

== War memorials ==
=== Thornton Hough war memorial, 1921 ===
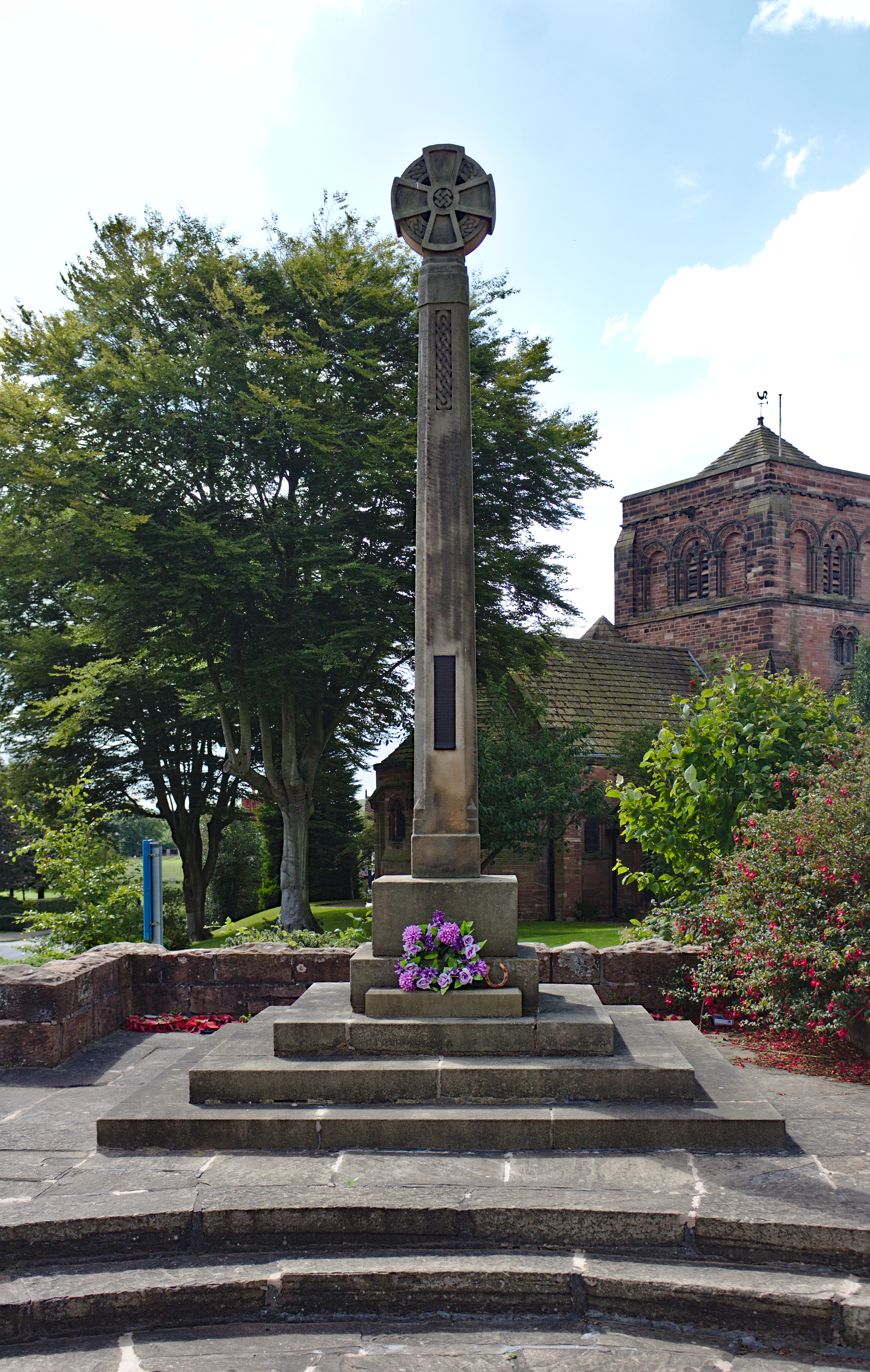
Thornton Hough war memorial

This is a listed building in the churchyard of St George's United Reformed Church, Thornton Hough. The war memorial was designed in sketch form by Prestwich and completed by his former mentor, architect James Lomax-Simpson, in 1921. It is constructed of red sandstone, Darley Dale stone, and bronze. The tall, fluted shaft of the memorial is a modernist form of the high cross, having a Celtic cross, "carved with a Celtic knot design", at the apex. It stands on a stepped base. There is a bronze plaque on the shaft, which says: "To the glory of God and in grateful memory of the men of this parish who laid down their lives in the Great War 1914–1918", with the names of the fallen. It stands on Darley Dale slabs, and is surrounded by a red sandstone wall, which forms part of the design.

=== Leigh Cenotaph, 1922 ===
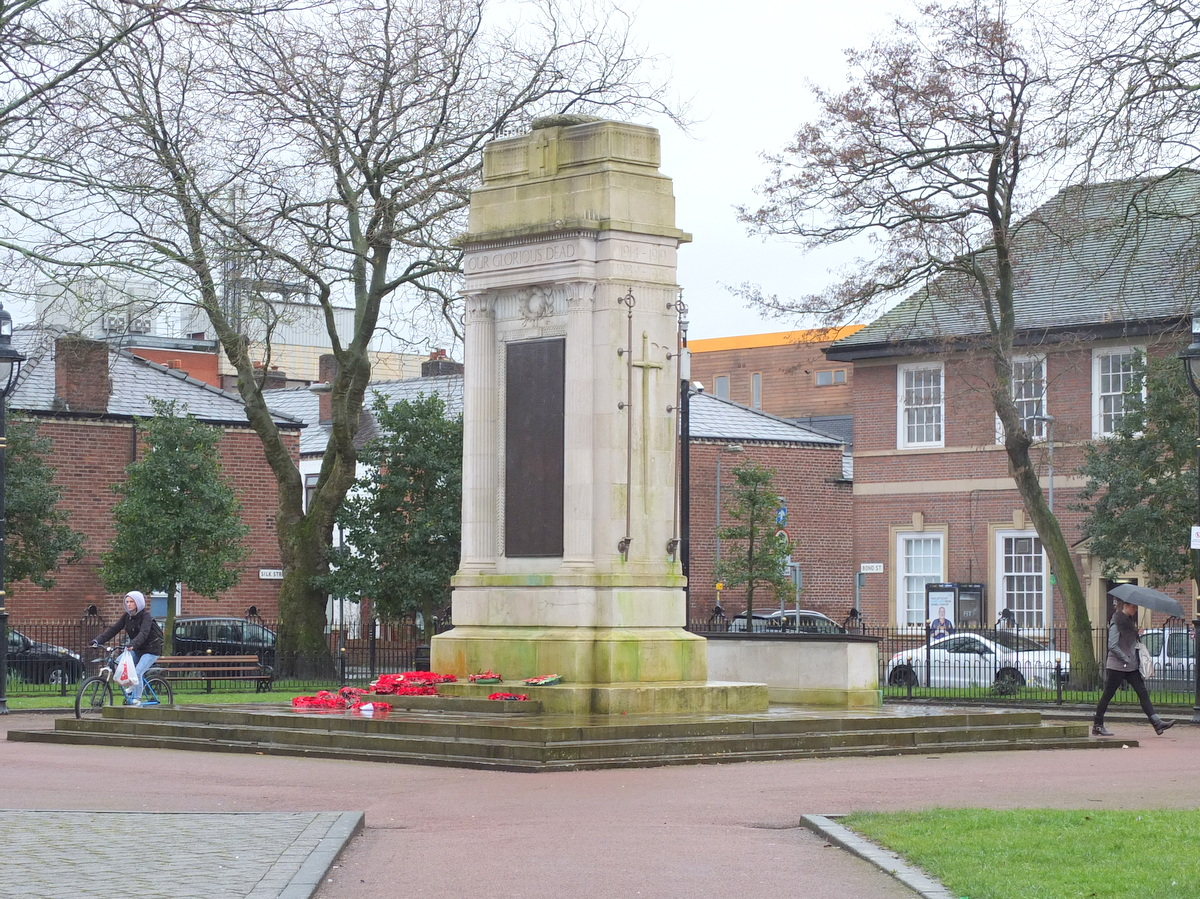
Leigh Cenotaph

This is a listed building. The cenotaph at Leigh was a competition win by Prestwich, and completed in 1922. It stands in a memorial garden, on a wide, stepped platform or stylobate, and is built in a stylised, Modernist, form of the Classical style. It carries two bronze plaques, with the names of the fallen, and the plaques are framed by wreaths and columns. The words, Our Glorious Dead, are engraved on the cornice of the monument. On the top of the structure is a "stylised coffin bearing crosses and wreath", in stone. On the sides of the monument are "sculptured swords and bronze pikes". This monument has been adapted to record the fallen from both World Wars.

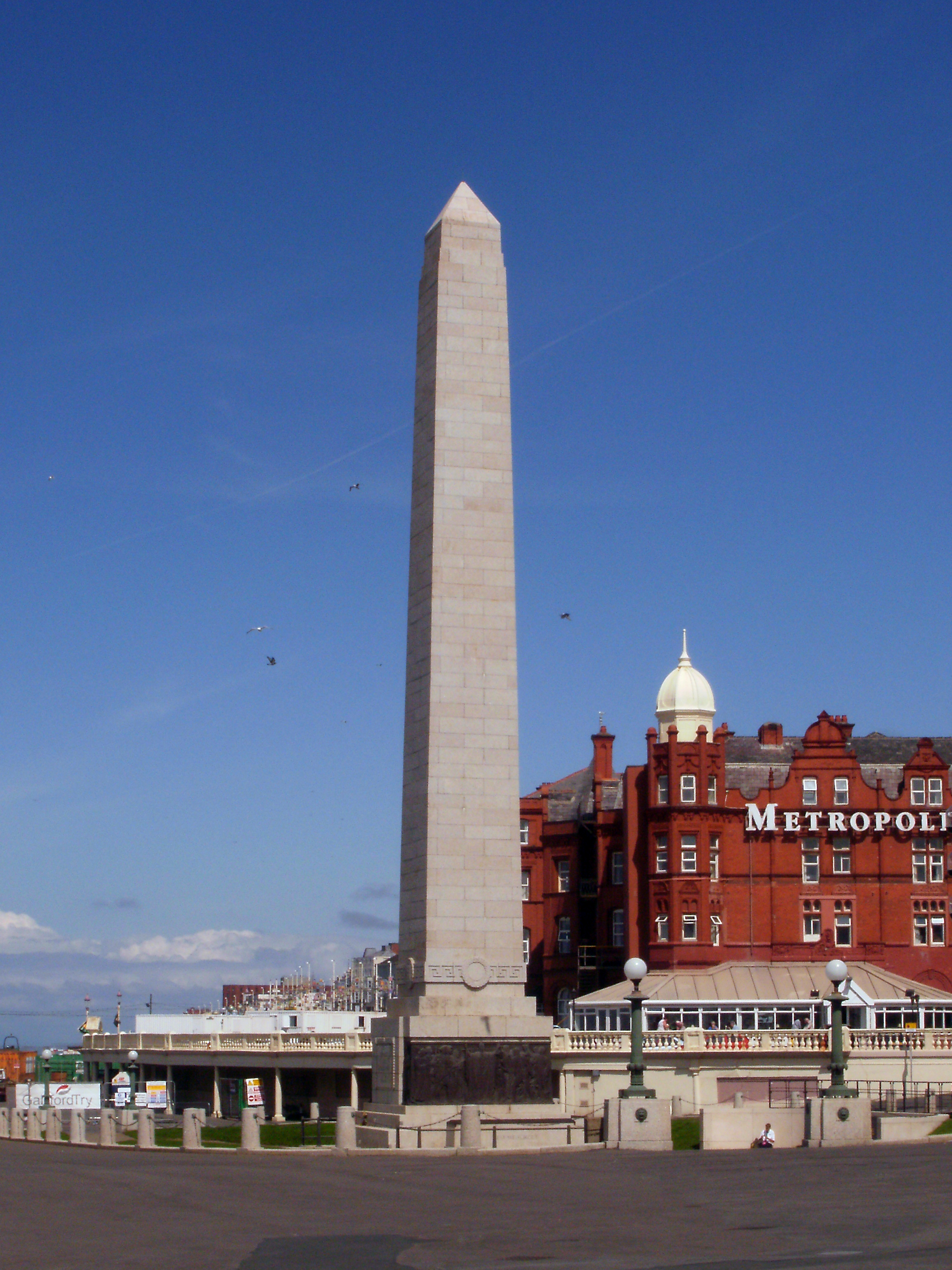
Blackpool war memorial

=== Blackpool war memorial, 1922–1923 ===
This is a listed building. Blackpool war memorial, with sculpture by Gilbert Ledward, was designed by Prestwich and completed in 1923. After the design was accepted in 1921, it was described as a "90-foot (27 m) obelisk in the centre of an oblong enclosure with circular ends, to be placed in the southern sunken garden of the Princess Parade, between the Hotel Metropole and the North Pier". The cost was projected at £15,000 (equivalent to £634,859.26 in 2025).

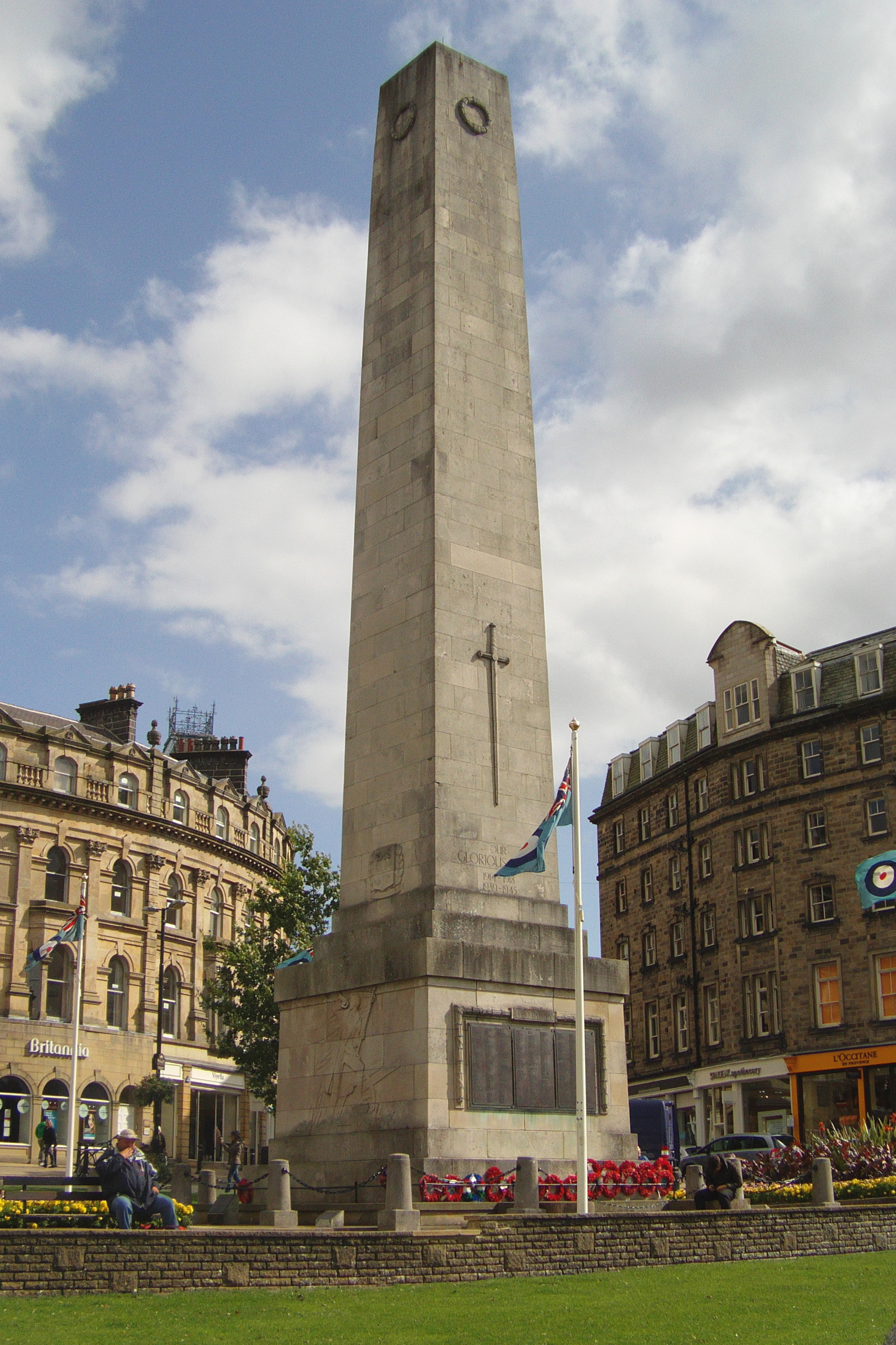
Harrogate War Memorial

=== Harrogate war memorial, 1922–1923 ===
This is a listed building. Harrogate war memorial, which stands in Prospect Square, Harrogate, North Yorkshire, was designed by Prestwich in 1923, with sculpture by Ledward. It is 23 metres (75 feet) tall.

=== Bennetthorpe war memorial, Doncaster, 1923 ===
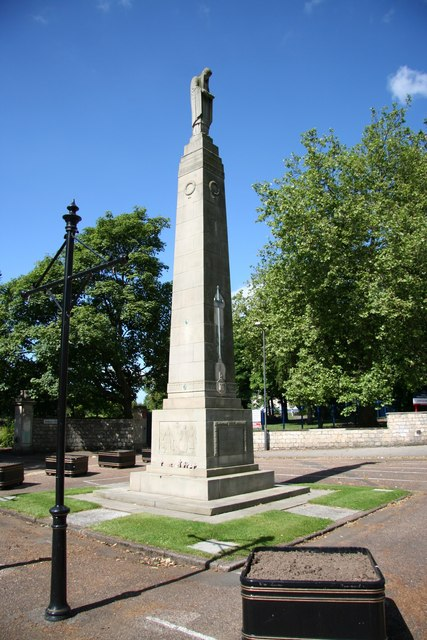
Bennetthorpe war memorial, Doncaster

This is a listed building, standing at the entrance to Elmfield Park in Doncaster. In 1921, Prestwich designed Bennetthorpe war memorial, also known as Doncaster memorial, at Roman Road and South Parade, Doncaster, and it was completed in 1923. It stands at 35 feet (11 m) high, and was paid for, mostly by subscription, at a cost of £1,533 (equivalent to £80,149.11 in 2025). It commemorates more than 1,000 Doncaster men who died in the First World War.

(The memorial) consists of a shaft of masonry resting on a square base, and surmounted by a figure expressive of sorrow for the fallen, holding up a laurel wreath of victory, in honour of the Doncaster men who fell in the war. On each of the four faces of the base are carved panels. One bears the inscription, "Our glorious dead 1914–1918". The other panels are carved in relief to represent the three services – the Army, Navy and Air Force. Above the front panel are Doncaster's Coat of Arms, and above that the Sword of Sacrifice ... the work was executed in Stancliff stone.

The monument was unveiled on 12 March 1923 by Colonel Charles Carter Moxon, C.M.G., D.S.O., T.D., who had been the commanding officer of the 5th King's Own Yorkshire Light Infantry (K.O.Y.L.I.) during the First World War. A procession marched from the Mansion House, headed by the 5th K.O.Y.L.I., with band playing, followed by the Yorkshire Dragoons, ex-servicemen, and the borough police with their chief constable. This was followed by a civic procession, with a mace bearer, mayor and ex-mayor, the town council, then magistrates, council officials, clergy and ministers, and last of all the townspeople. After a speech by Moxon and a dedication of the monument by George Sandford, Archdeacon of Doncaster, the "Last Post" was sounded by buglers. Wreaths were laid by the town's institutions, and flowers were laid by the widows. Elmfield Park was opened on the same day.

== Exhibitions ==
In 1910, some of Prestwich's Port Sunlight designs were exhibited at the Royal Academy. In 1936 and 1937 photographs and drawings of Prestwich's designs including the fire station and public baths at Northampton and the Blackpool war memorial were shown, in an exhibition of work by past students of Liverpool School of architecture, at the Walker Art Gallery, Liverpool.

== Institutions and awards ==
Prestwich was elected associate of the Royal Institute of British Architects (A.R.I.B.A.), and fellow (F.R.I.B.A.) in 1918 and 1928 respectively. In 1938 he received the RIBA Architecture Bronze Medal for Manchester.
