= Caldecott Park =

Urban park in Rugby, England

Coordinates: 52.3770°N 1.2625°W

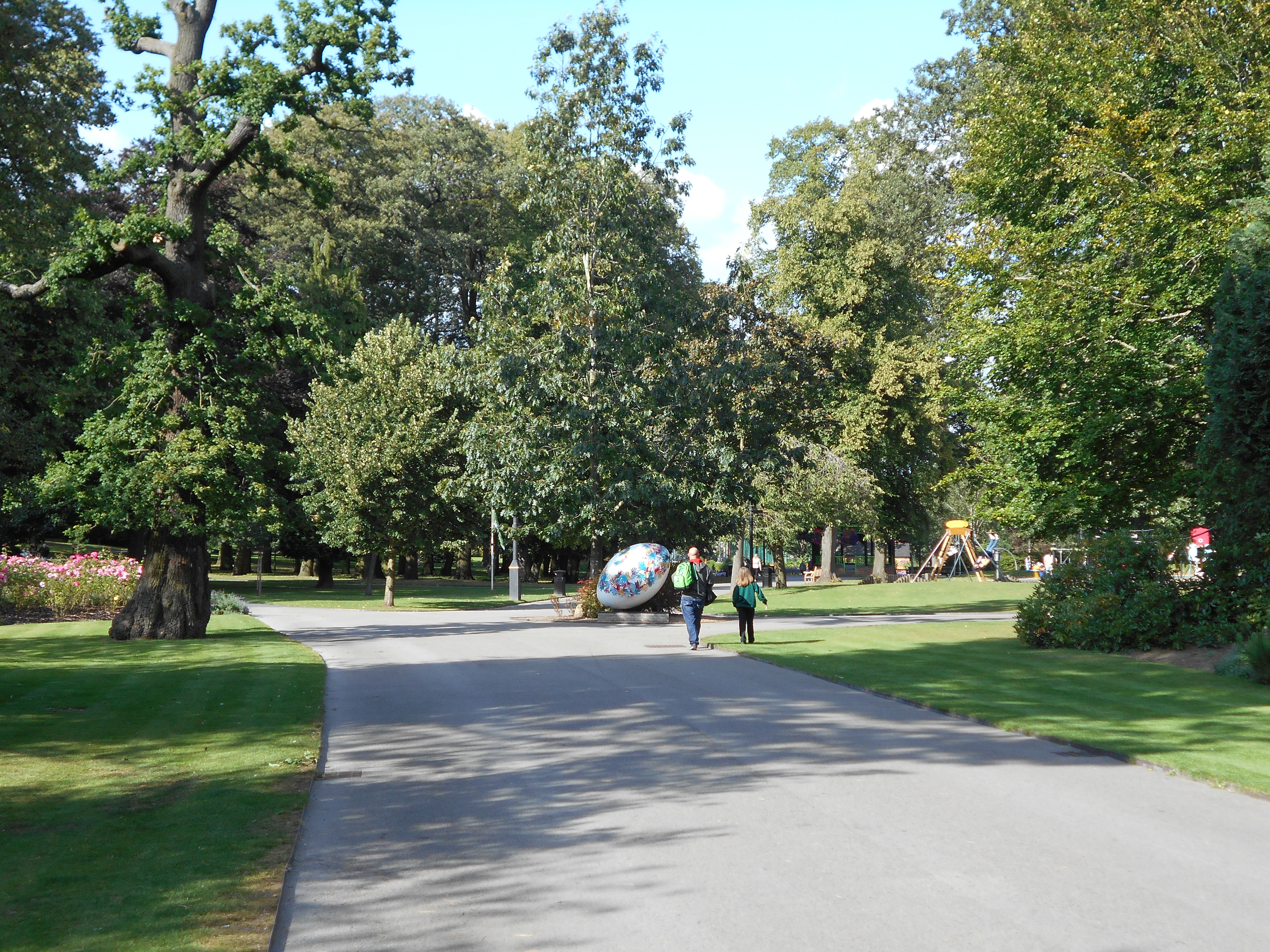
Caldecott Park

Caldecott Park is an urban park located in the centre of Rugby, England. Most of the land was purchased by the Rugby Urban District Council in 1903 from Thomas Caldecott, the last lord of the manor. There was additional land purchased to the north of the original park in 1911, bringing the park to its current size of 10.6 acres (43,000 m^{2}).

There was an ornamental lake in the centre of the park until it was filled in 1922. The Second World War saw the removal of a floral staircase as well as the original iron park railings which were taken away as part of the war effort. The 1970s saw the loss of many of the trees in the park to Dutch Elm Disease.

However, in the 1990s there has been a programme of tree replanting. Also in 1996 a series of entertainment events were organised over the summer months. These have continued since and there are also craft fairs, art exhibitions and musical performances on the bandstand. Other attractions include a children's play area, tennis courts, a bowling green and a small kiosk which sells refreshments.

Now, to celebrate Saint Georges Day, scouts march from Caldecott park to St Andrews Church.

In 2006 the Heritage Lottery Fund awarded Rugby Borough Council just under £1,000,000 to restore the park. In November 2007 the final plans had been drawn up and were awaiting final permission to proceed. Plans included: replacing the current fencing with old style fencing like the ones removed in the Second World War; to relay the footpaths; to modernise the play areas; to build a cafe; to develop formal sports pitches and to re-create the floral steps and were passed. Work was completed in spring 2009 and the park was officially opened on 2 May with speeches from local dignitaries and displays by locals schools. In 2013 Caldecott Park was dedicated as a Fields in Trust, Queen Elizabeth II Field - and protected in perpetuity for public recreation.
