= Butte Mountains =

Mountain range in Nevada, United States

- Location within Nevada

Highest point
- Elevation: 2,672 m (8,766 ft)

Geography
- Country: United States
- State: Nevada
- District: White Pine County
- Range coordinates: 39°42′49.758″N 115°16′23.124″W
- Topo map: USGS McBrides Sheep Well

The Butte Mountains are a mountain range in White Pine County, Nevada; which is on the north of the White River Valley.
