= Butte City =

Butte City may refer to:

- Butte City, Arizona
- Butte City, California
- Butte City, Idaho
- An early name for Butte, Montana
