= Butte Creek =

Butte Creek may refer to:

- Helltown, California or Butte Creek, an unincorporated community in Butte County, California
- Butte Creek (Butte County, California), a Sacramento River tributary
- Butte Creek (Siskiyou County, California), a Klamath River tributary
- Butte Creek (Oregon), a Pudding River tributary

== See also ==
- Little Butte Creek, a Rogue River tributary in Jackson and Klamath counties, Oregon
- Big Butte Creek, a Rogue River tributary in Jackson County, Oregon
