= Central Police Station, Bristol =

Building in Bristol, England

Central Police Station
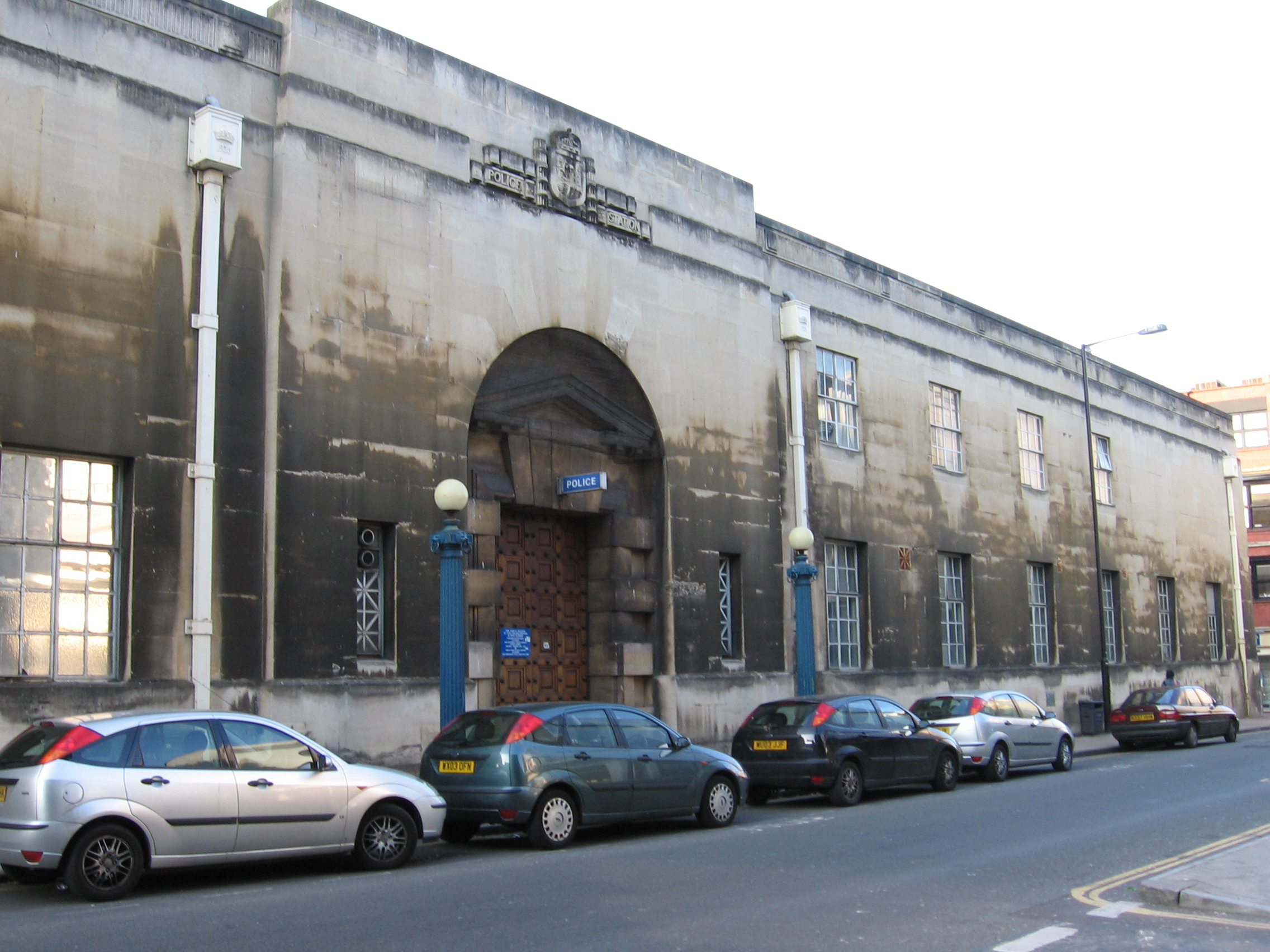

- Location within Bristol

General information
- Location: Bristol, England
- Coordinates: 51.4566°N 2.5938°W
- Completed: 1928

The Central Police Station, also known as the Bridewell is a historic building on Nelson Street, Broadmead, Bristol, England. It was opened in 1828 and finally closed in 2005. It is a grade II listed building.

== History ==
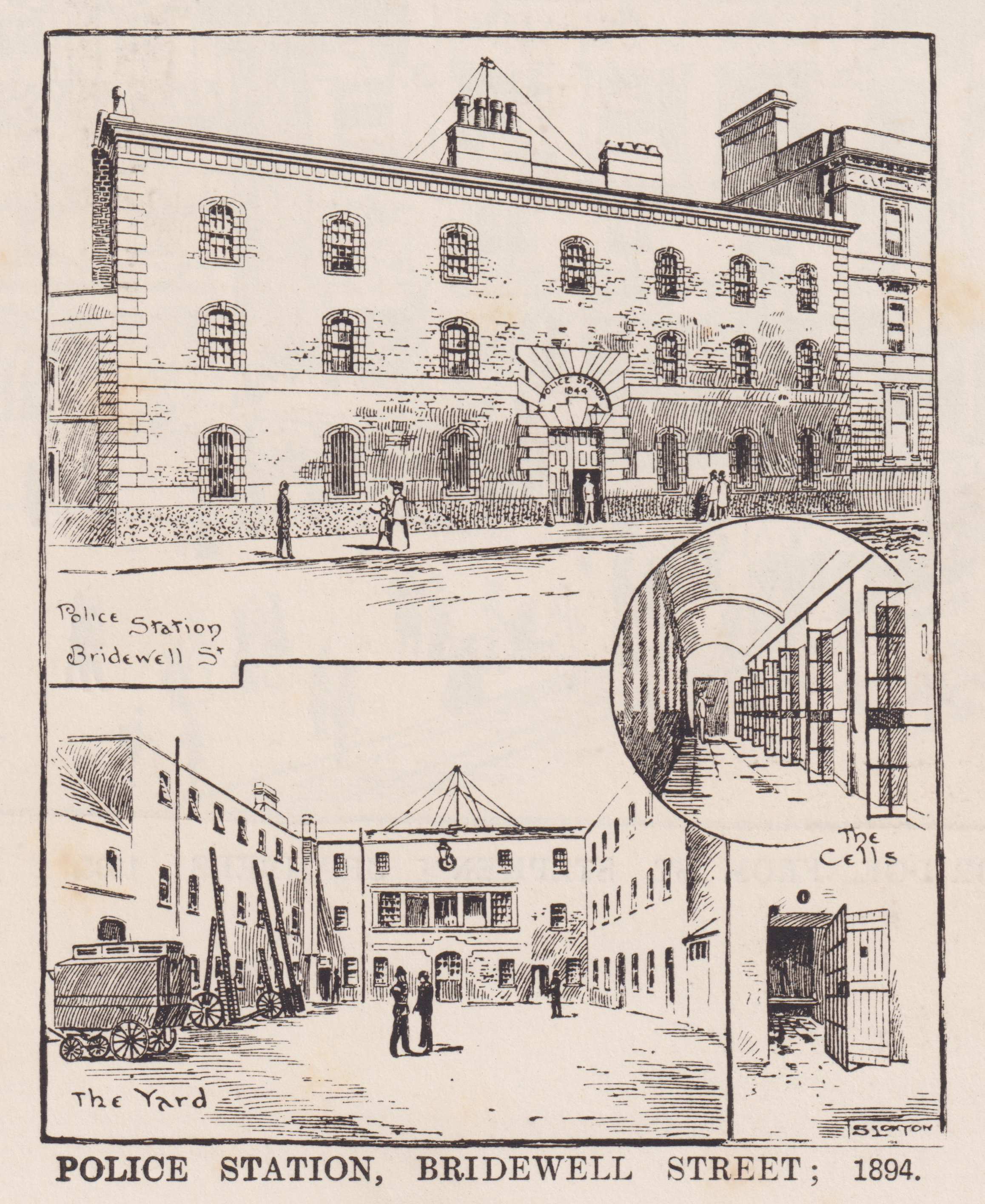
Bridewell Police Station, 1894

Prior to the construction of the present building, the Central Police Station had been located in Bridewell Street. In 1880, the watch committee were involved in the setting up of an independent fire brigade and a site was chosen adjacent to the police station. A steam fire engine was purchased and arrangements were made to stable the horses needed to pull the fire engine in the yard of the police station.

The Nelson Street building was built in 1928 by Ivor Jones and Percy Thomas and opened as a police station in November 1930 near the site of a previous station. Neighbouring buildings housed law courts and a fire station. It closed as a working police station in August 2005.

The building has been designated by English Heritage as a grade II listed building. English Heritage describes it as having an "axial plan with wings at each end. Stripped Neo-Georgian style with Mannerist detail. 2 storeys; 12-window range. A near-symmetrical front has curved ends and short returns, with a fluted frieze and parapet."

== Current and future uses ==
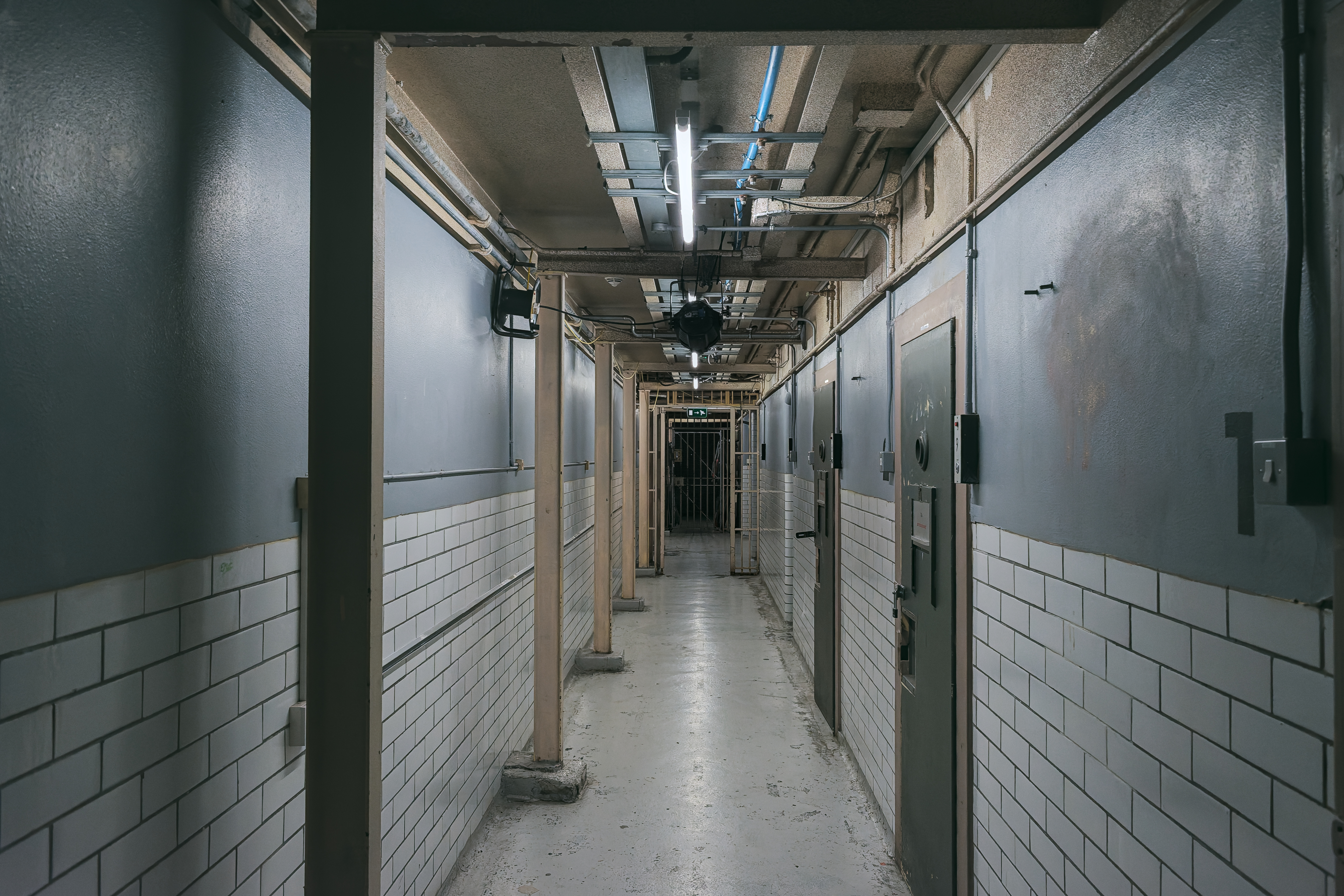
Cells in the basement of the police station

In December 2007 a graffiti exhibition was held in the Old Bridewell Police Station building to raise funds for Bristol Children's Hospital. 70 artists took part and an artwork was donated by Banksy to the cause.

Currently the building is known as The Island. It became home to Artspace Lifespace by agreement the property developers Urban Splash whilst a new use for the site was found. The current owners of the building are the Creative Youth Network, who also run The Station from the complex.
