= Lord of Bute =

Title of nobility in Scotland

The Lord of Bute was a title for the lord of Bute, Scotland in High Medieval Scotland.

== Lords of Bute ==
- Alan fitz Walter 1200–1204
- John Stewart of Bute ?–1449
