= USS Butte =

USS Butte may refer to:

- USS Butte (APA-68), was a Gilliam-class attack transport commissioned in 1944, and used in the "Operation Crossroads" atomic bomb tests after World War II, and was finally scuttled in 1948.
- USS Butte (AE-27), was a Kilauea-class ammunition ship and commissioned in 1968. She was transferred from the Navy to the Military Sealift Command in 1996, and after her retirement from service, she was sunk as a target in 2006.
