= Percy Thomas =

British architect (1883–1969)

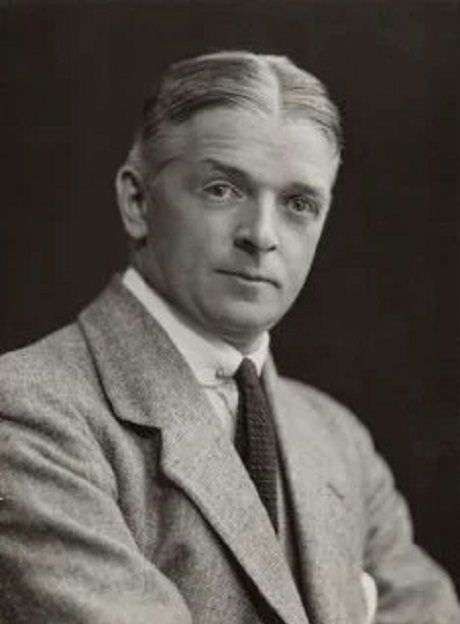
Thomas in 1939

Sir Percy Edward Thomas OBE (13 September 1883 – 19 August 1969) was an Anglo-Welsh architect who worked in Wales for the majority of his life. He was twice RIBA president (1935–37 and 1943–46).

== Biography ==
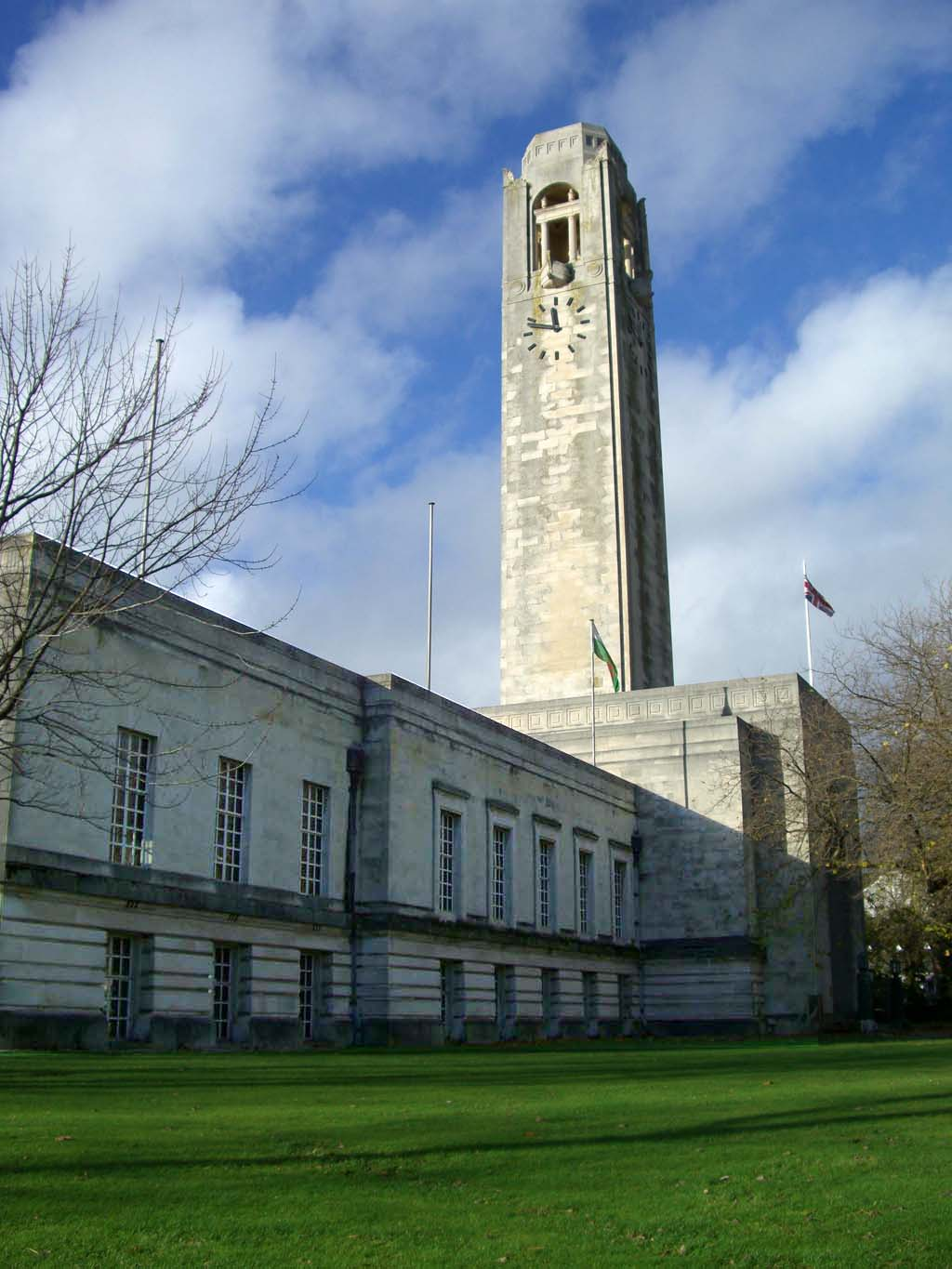
City and County of Swansea Guildhall (1930–34)

Percy Edward Thomas was born on 13 September 1883 in South Shields, County Durham, the son of a sea captain from Narberth in Pembrokeshire, with whom the family often travelled. The family moved to Cardiff during the 1890s and Captain Thomas died at sea in 1897.

Percy Thomas began work in a shipping office, but changed to a career in architecture on advice from a phrenologist. In 1903 he won the architecture competition at the National Eisteddfod of Wales in Llanelli. After several years working in England, he began collaborating with Ivor Jones of Cardiff, and they went into partnership in 1913.

Thomas won the competition for the design of the YMCA building in Merthyr Tydfil (built 1911), which was an important step in developing his career. The building was designed in an Edwardian Baroque style in red brick and yellow terracotta, and later become the Mid Glamorgan County Council education offices, and housed the gym of the champion boxer Eddie Thomas. It is a Grade II Listed Building, but has been in poor condition since the 1980s, and was in danger of collapse in 2022.

During the First World War Thomas joined the Artists Rifles in 1915, and served on the Western Front.

After the war he returned to Cardiff. He was commissioned by David Davies, 1st Baron Davies of Llandinam, to design the Temple of Peace in Cathays Park.

As a designer of civic buildings, such as Central Police Station, Bristol, Swansea Guildhall (1930–34), Swinton & Pendlebury Town Hall (1938, co-designed with Ernest Prestwich), Lancashire and Hiatt Baker Hall, Bristol (1966), he was a rival to Arthur John Hope. Other works by him included the campus of Aberystwyth University. He was elected president of the Royal Institute of British Architects in 1935 (until 1937) and awarded their Royal Gold Medal in 1939. He was knighted in 1946.

Percy Thomas became seriously ill in 1962, retiring from the company in 1963. He died on 19 August 1969.

== Percy Thomas Partnership ==
The company established by Percy Thomas was based in Cardiff, and put its name to several landmark buildings in Wales and England, the most recent being the Wales Millennium Centre. The practice lasted for 94 years and ultimately became known as the Percy Thomas Partnership.

In June 2004 Percy Thomas Partnership went into administration after cancellations or delays of key projects. They were bought by the large British outsourcing company, Capita, who created a new arm of their property consultancy division called Capita Percy Thomas.

== See also ==
- Dale Owen

== Sources ==
- Welsh Biography Online
- Proctor, Robert (2025). Percy Thomas: Modern Architecture as a National Service. University of Wales Press. ISBN 978-1-83772-210-5
