= First Minister of Wales =

Leader of the Welsh Government

- Prif Weinidog Cymru (Welsh)
- Logo

- Flag of Wales

- Incumbent; Rhun ap Iorwerth since 12 May 2026
- Welsh Government; Welsh Cabinet; Senedd
- Style: First Minister (informal); The Right Honourable (UK and Commonwealth); His Excellency (international)
- Status: Head of Government
- Abbreviation: FM
- Member of: Senedd; Welsh Cabinet; Privy Council; British-Irish Council; PM and Heads of Devolved Governments Council; Council of the Nations and Regions
- Reports to: Senedd
- Seat: Crown Buildings, Cathays Park, Cardiff
- Nominator: Senedd
- Appointer: The Monarch
- Term length: At His Majesty's pleasure, unless removed by Senedd or resignation
- Formation: 12 May 1999
- First holder: Alun Michael AM
- Salary: £174,600 per annum (2026) (including £79,817 MS salary)
- Website: https://www.gov.wales/rhun-ap-iorwerth-ms

The first minister of Wales (Welsh: Prif Weinidog Cymru) is the head of the Welsh Government and keeper of the Welsh Seal. Established in 1999 as a result of Welsh devolution and initially as the assembly first secretary, the office serves as Wales's most senior political position and has evolved significantly through successive constitutional reforms. The first minister chairs the Welsh Cabinet, leads the formulation and implementation of government policy across all devolved areas, and represents Wales in official capacities both domestically and internationally, including on constitutional affairs when they relate to devolution and the Welsh Government.

The first minister is a member of the Senedd who is nominated by the Senedd (Welsh Parliament; Welsh: Senedd Cymru) before being officially appointed by the Monarch. The first minister appoints members of the cabinet, junior ministers, and law officers, whilst remaining directly accountable to the Senedd for their actions and those of the Welsh Government. The first minister exercises executive authority over matters that are devolved to the Welsh Government including powers relating to health, education, economic development, transport, housing, and the Welsh language, whilst working within the broader constitutional framework of the United Kingdom.

The first minister maintains offices at the Crown Buildings, in Cathays Park, Cardiff, which serves as Welsh Government headquarters and in Tŷ Hywel, adjacent to the Senedd building in Cardiff Bay. and. The incumbent first minister is Rhun ap Iorwerth, who has served since 12 May 2026.

== History ==
The Government of Wales Act 1998 established the National Assembly for Wales, with an executive (the Cabinet) and a limited legislature. The head of the Welsh executive was initially titled "Assembly First Secretary" (Welsh: Prif Ysgrifennydd y Cynulliad) under Section 53(1) of the 1998 Act.

The establishment of the assembly followed campaign efforts since the 20th century for the transfer administrative responsibilities from Whitehall to Wales. Following the 1964 UK election, a new Secretary of State for Wales was created with responsibility for housing, local government and roads, with additional powers gradually added over subsequent years. The 1973 Royal Commission on the Constitution recommended the creation of elected bodies for Scotland and Wales, but the proposals were rejected by 79.7% to 20.3% in the 1979 Welsh devolution referendum. Following their 1997 manifesto commitments, the incoming Labour UK government held a referendum on devolution in September 1997, with 50.3% voting in favour and 49.7% against, on majority of just 6,721 votes.

The first person to hold the office was Alun Michael, who became Assembly First Secretary on 12 May 1999. Michael later resigned months later on 9 February 2000, due to his minority Labour administration experiencing difficulties in securing agreement from other parties over European Union Objective One funding, and resigned to avoid a vote of no confidence by the opposition parties.

=== Title change ===
Michael's successor Rhodri Morgan, appointed in February 2000, announced that he would want to be addressed as "First Minister" rather than "First Secretary". Morgan also renamed "Assembly Secretaries" as "Ministers".

The Government of Wales Act 2006 made the first minister the official "Keeper of the Welsh Seal" and allowed the post to be formally known as "First Minister".

== Appointment process ==
Candidates for the position of first minister are nominated by Members of the Senedd, who elect the first minister by majority vote. If no candidate achieves a majority in the first ballot, further ballots are held until one candidate receives majority support. This process requires only a simple majority of votes cast, not an absolute majority of all Senedd members.

Once elected by the Senedd, the presiding officer formally notifies the Monarch, who then appoints the nominee as first minister . The most recent appointment was Rhun ap Iorwerth in May 2026, following Plaid Cymru becoming the largest party in the Senedd at the 2026 election.

== Powers and responsibilities ==
The first minister exercises executive authority within the Welsh Government and holds responsibility for the overall strategic direction of the devolved administration. Under the arrangements established by successive Government of Wales Acts, executive functions are conferred on the Senedd and then delegated to the first minister and other Welsh Ministers as appropriate. Since the Government of Wales Act 2006, the first minister has been appointed directly by the Monarch and represents the Crown in Wales, marking a significant symbolic shift in the constitutional basis of Welsh governance.

Key responsibilities include oversight of the Welsh Government civil service in partnership with the Permanent Secretary, policy development and coordination across all devolved areas, and the appointment of Welsh Ministers, Deputy Welsh Ministers and the Counsel General for Wales, subject to royal approval. Under the Government of Wales Act 2006, the Welsh Government may comprise a maximum of 12 Welsh Ministers (excluding the first minister and Counsel General), limiting the total size to 14 members.

=== Legislative competence and devolved areas ===
Following the Wales Act 2017, Wales operates under a 'reserved powers' model where the Senedd can legislate on any matter not specifically reserved to the UK Parliament. The first minister leads the Welsh Government in proposing bills to the Senedd on subjects within devolved competence, which include health, education, economic development, transport, local government, agriculture, forestry, fisheries, environment, housing, social services, culture, sport, tourism and the Welsh language. The first minister oversees the Welsh Government's borrowing powers, which include the ability to borrow up to £1 billion for capital spending with UK Treasury consent.

== Accountability mechanism ==
The first minister is directly accountable to the Senedd for their actions and those of the Welsh Government. This accountability operates through various parliamentary procedures including questions, debates, and committee scrutiny. The Senedd holds the power to pass a vote of no confidence in the first minister, which would require their resignation, as demonstrated by the events leading to Alun Michael's resignation in 2000.

== Intergovernmental relations ==
The first minister participates in various intergovernmental structures including the British-Irish Council, the Prime Minister and Heads of Devolved Governments Council, and the Council of the Nations and Regions. The Intergovernmental Relations Review, published in January 2022, established new structures for dialogue between UK and devolved governments, including the Interministerial Standing Committee and Finance: Interministerial Standing Committee.

=== Challenges and tensions ===
Relations between the first minister and UK Government have faced ongoing challenges. The Welsh Government has raised concerns about being treated as a "stakeholder rather than a devolved government partner", with decisions often made by the UK Government with only minimal consultation. The Welsh Government has particularly criticised the UK Government's approach to legislation affecting devolved matters, citing inadequate engagement during the passage of the Energy Act 2023 as an example.

=== Secretary of State for Wales relationship ===
The Secretary of State for Wales serves as the primary link between the UK Government and the Welsh Government, with responsibilities including ensuring the smooth running of the devolution settlement and acting as the liaison between the two administrations. The role has evolved significantly since devolution, with some calling for its abolition or merger with other territorial Secretary of State positions to reflect the changed constitutional landscape.

== Practical operations ==
=== Official locations and working arrangements ===
The first minister operates from two main official locations. One office is located in Tŷ Hywel, which is adjacent to the Senedd building in Cardiff Bay and serves as the principal workspace when engaging with the Welsh Parliament. The other office is at the Crown Buildings in Cathays Park, Cardiff, which serves as the headquarters of the Welsh Government and houses the main Welsh Government offices.

Unlike the first minister of Scotland, Wales does not provide an official residence for its first minister. There have been calls for the establishment of such a residence, with suggestions including the use of Cardiff's former Mansion House, but no official residence has been designated.

The Welsh Government maintains offices throughout Wales to support the first minister's work across the country, including locations in Carmarthen, Caernarfon, Aberystwyth, Llandrindod Wells, and other regional centres.

=== Parliamentary accountability: First Minister's Questions ===
The first minister faces regular parliamentary scrutiny through a Welsh equivalent of Prime Minister's Questions. First Minister's Questions takes place weekly in the Senedd, typically on Tuesday afternoons at 13:30, providing up to 45 minutes for Members of the Senedd to question the first minister on matters within the Welsh Government's remit.

The format follows established parliamentary conventions: Members of the Senedd (MSs) may ask oral questions which are selected by ballot conducted by the Table Office, with any Member except party leaders eligible to enter the ballot. Selected members must table their oral questions at least three working days before the session. Following the minister's initial response, the questioning Member may ask one supplementary question, and other Members may be called to ask related supplementary questions at the Presiding Officer's discretion.

The sessions are broadcast live on Senedd.tv and archived for public access, providing transparency and public accountability. In addition to regular questions, the first minister may face Topical Questions on matters of urgent public significance and Emergency Questions which can be taken without notice if deemed by the Presiding Officer to be of urgent public importance.

=== Remuneration and expenses ===
The first minister receives a salary of £148,575 per annum as of 2022, which includes the standard £67,920 Member of the Senedd salary plus an additional ministerial salary. This arrangement differs from the UK Government, where ministerial salaries have been frozen since 2010, with some ministers declining salary increases and making funds available for public spending.

=== Transport and security arrangements ===
Details regarding security arrangements for the first minister are not disclosed publicly for operational security reasons, consistent with standard practice for government officials. The UK's Protection Command, which provides security for senior government figures, operates under a policy of neither confirming nor denying specific protection arrangements.

The first minister's use of official transport and related expenses are governed by the Ministerial Code, which requires that official transport should not be used for party, private or other non-ministerial business except where justified on security grounds. The code emphasises efficient use of resources, cost consciousness, and public accountability in all transport arrangements.

Official cars are made available to the first minister for any purpose that secures a saving of time, and ministers are permitted to use official cars for home-to-office journeys provided they will be working on Welsh Government business during the journey. Travel expenses for official business are normally borne by the Welsh Government's Cabinet Division.

=== Support staff and administration ===
The first minister is supported by the Welsh Government civil service, which as of March 2018 comprised 5,015 full-time equivalent civil servants working across Wales. The civil service operates under the rules and customs of His Majesty's Civil Service but serves the devolved administration rather than the UK Government.

The Permanent Secretary heads the Welsh Government civil service and works closely with the first minister on policy development, coordination, and oversight of the civil service. This includes responsibility for expectations, oversight and support for the Welsh Government civil service working with the Permanent Secretary.

=== Transparency and accountability measures ===
The Welsh Government operates under a comprehensive publication scheme that makes information routinely available to the public, including details of ministerial activities, expenses, and decision-making processes. This includes publication of board members' expenses, ministerial expenditure over £25,000, and adherence to the ministerial code.

Information about the first minister's official travel costs and expenses is published in line with the ministerial code, typically at the end of each financial year. Members of the Senedd regularly use parliamentary questions to seek details about ministerial travel, meetings, and expenditure, providing ongoing scrutiny of the first minister's activities and use of public resources.

== See also ==
- List of first ministers of Wales
- List of current heads of government in the United Kingdom and dependencies
- Prime Minister of the United Kingdom
- Deputy First Minister of Wales
- Welsh Government

== Sources ==
- Dates are from various BBC News Online articles from 1999 to 2003.
