= Cardiff Bay Police Station =

Police area headquarters in Cardiff, UK

Coordinates: 51.4648°N 3.1703°W

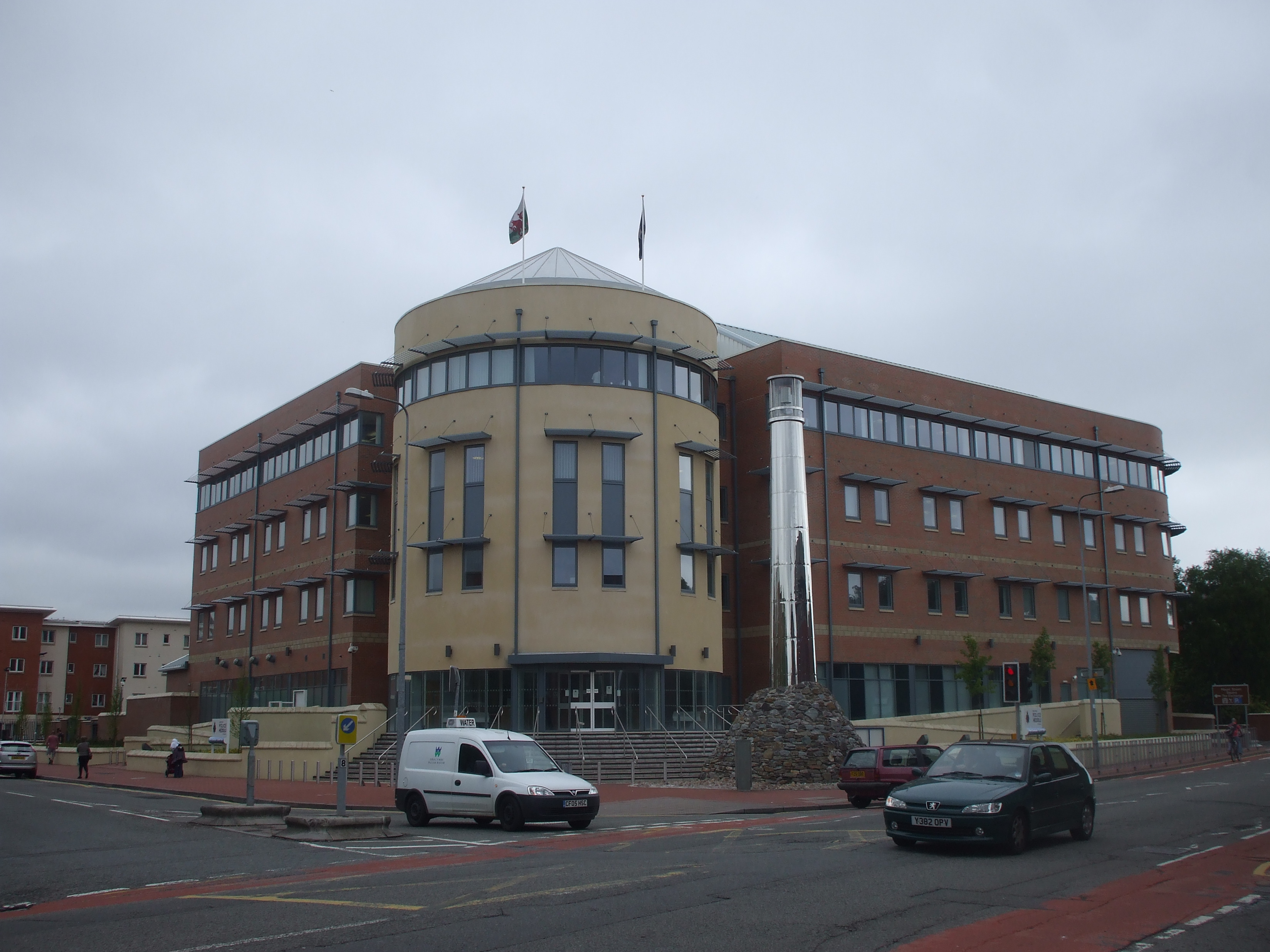
Cardiff Bay Police Station

Cardiff Bay Police Station (which replaced Butetown Police Station) is the South Wales Police Eastern Division area headquarters and custody suite, located on James Street, Cardiff, Wales.

== Background ==
=== Butetown Police Station ===
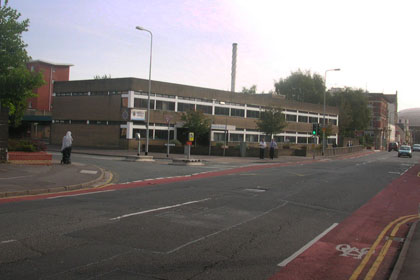
Butetown Police Station (2006)

Butetown Police Station (on the same site as the new headquarters) was built circa 1968 as a two-storey community police station for Butetown, Cardiff.

It was a notable location for events surrounding the investigation, arrests, detention and questioning of the suspects following the murder of Lynette White in 1988, which led to the wrongful imprisonment of three Cardiff men.

Butetown Police Station was demolished in November 2006 to make way for the new police headquarters.

=== Cardiff Bay Police Station ===
Plans were unveiled in 2002 for a replacement for South Wales Police's Eastern Division headquarters in Cardiff Bay. The existing facilities (including only eight police cells) at the division's headquarters in Cathays Park were outdated and unfit for purpose. In August 2006 the Design and Build contract was awarded to construction firm, Stradform, with architectural and engineering services provided by Capita Symonds.

The new police station opened in 2009, providing custody facilities for Cardiff and Barry and divisional headquarters for South Wales Police.

An 18m (60 feet) high sculpture of a lighthouse was erected in front of the main steps of the police station at a cost of £75,000, making it the most expensive piece of art paid for by any UK police force in the previous five years.

== Facilities ==
The new police station has 60 custody cells spread across three wings, with access to natural daylight via solar tubes. There are also 11 interview rooms and state-of-the-art recording and security equipment.
