= Redwood Building =

Cardiff University building

Coordinates: 51.48783°N 3.18417°W

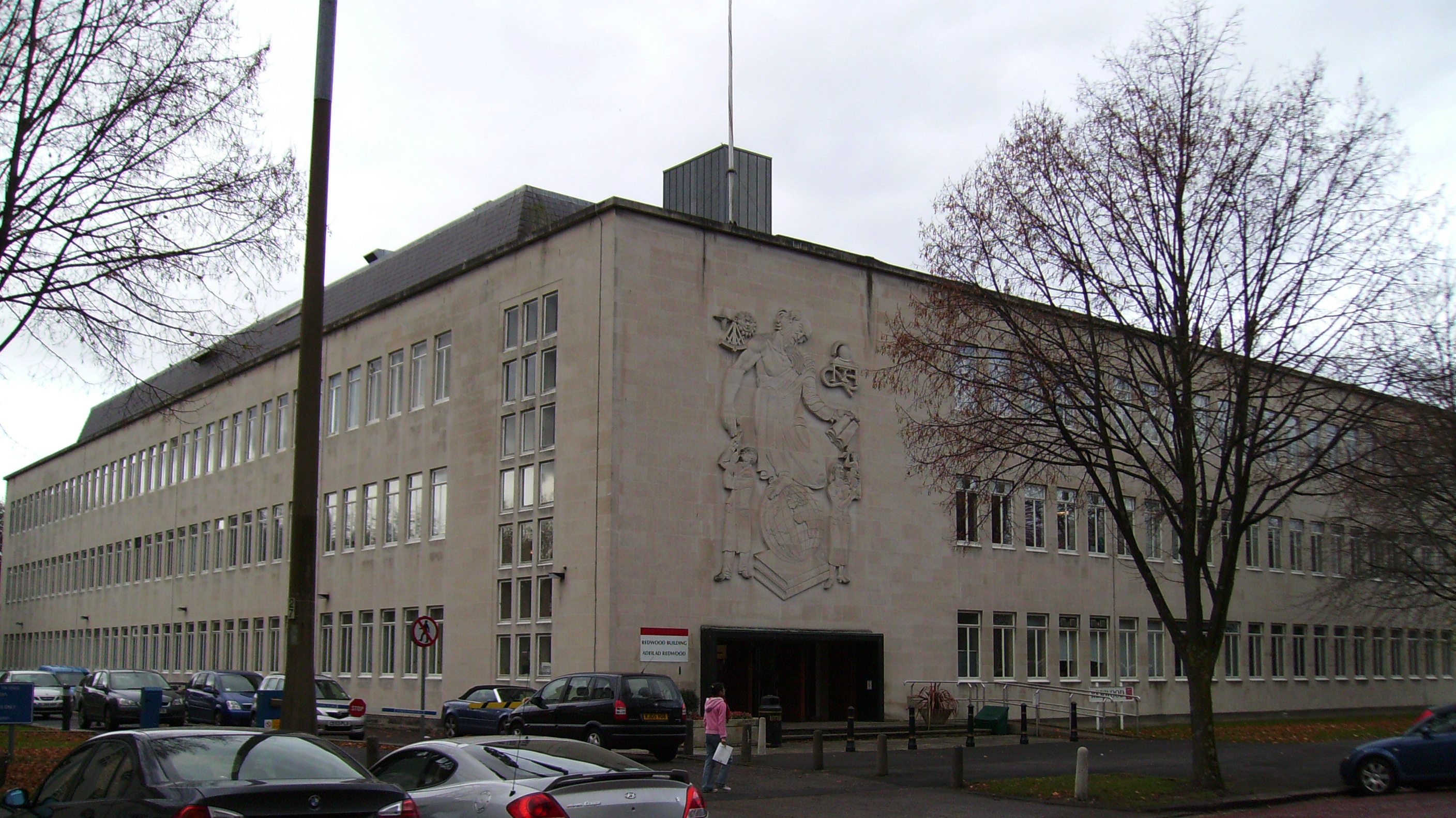
Redwood Building

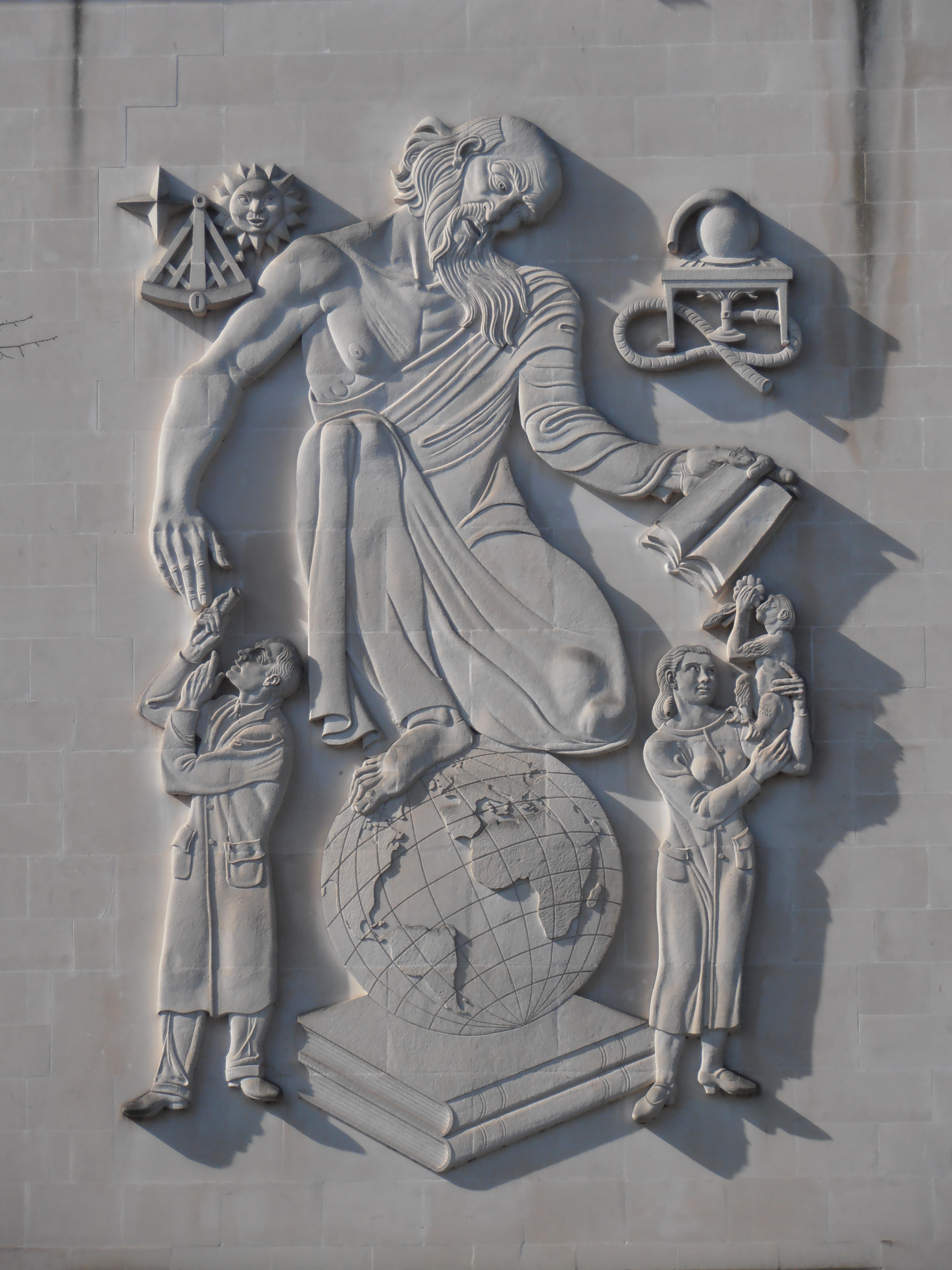
Relief sculpture by Edward Bainbridge Copnall on the Redwood Building

The Redwood Building is a Cardiff University building, in the Cathays Park area of Cardiff, Wales.

The building was opened in 1961 by the Welsh College of Advanced Technology, which in 1968 became the University of Wales Institute of Science and Technology (UWIST). In 1988 UWIST merged into the University of Wales College Cardiff, which became Cardiff University in 1999.

The building was designed by the Sir Percy Thomas & Son and is a rectangular three-story block in the modernist style. The main entrance is at the extreme left end of the west façade, above which is a large relief sculpture by Edward Bainbridge Copnall, showing an elderly toga-clad man with his foot on a globe, reaching out protectively over a scientist and a nurse.

In 1979 the building was named after the Redwood family of Boverton, near Llantwit Major, namely the pharmacist Theophilus Redwood, his son Sir Boverton Redwood as well as Theophilus's medical brother Lewis Redwood and his son Thomas Redwood (after whom the former Redwood Hospital of Rhymney was named). Theophilus Redwood was a founding father of the Pharmaceutical Society of Great Britain among connections with the Chemical Society and as founder president of the Society of Public Analysts, while his son Sir Boverton Redwood was a distinguished petroleum chemist – sometime president of the Society of Chemical Industry. The 1979 naming by UWIST Council followed a suggestion by Dr J D R Thomas that the building be named "Redwood Building" coupled with the names of Theophilus Redwood and of his son Sir Boverton Redwood, to whom were later added the other family names of Lewis and Thomas Redwood.
