= Cardiff Central police station =

Police station in Cardiff, Wales

Coordinates: 51.4852°N 3.1808°W

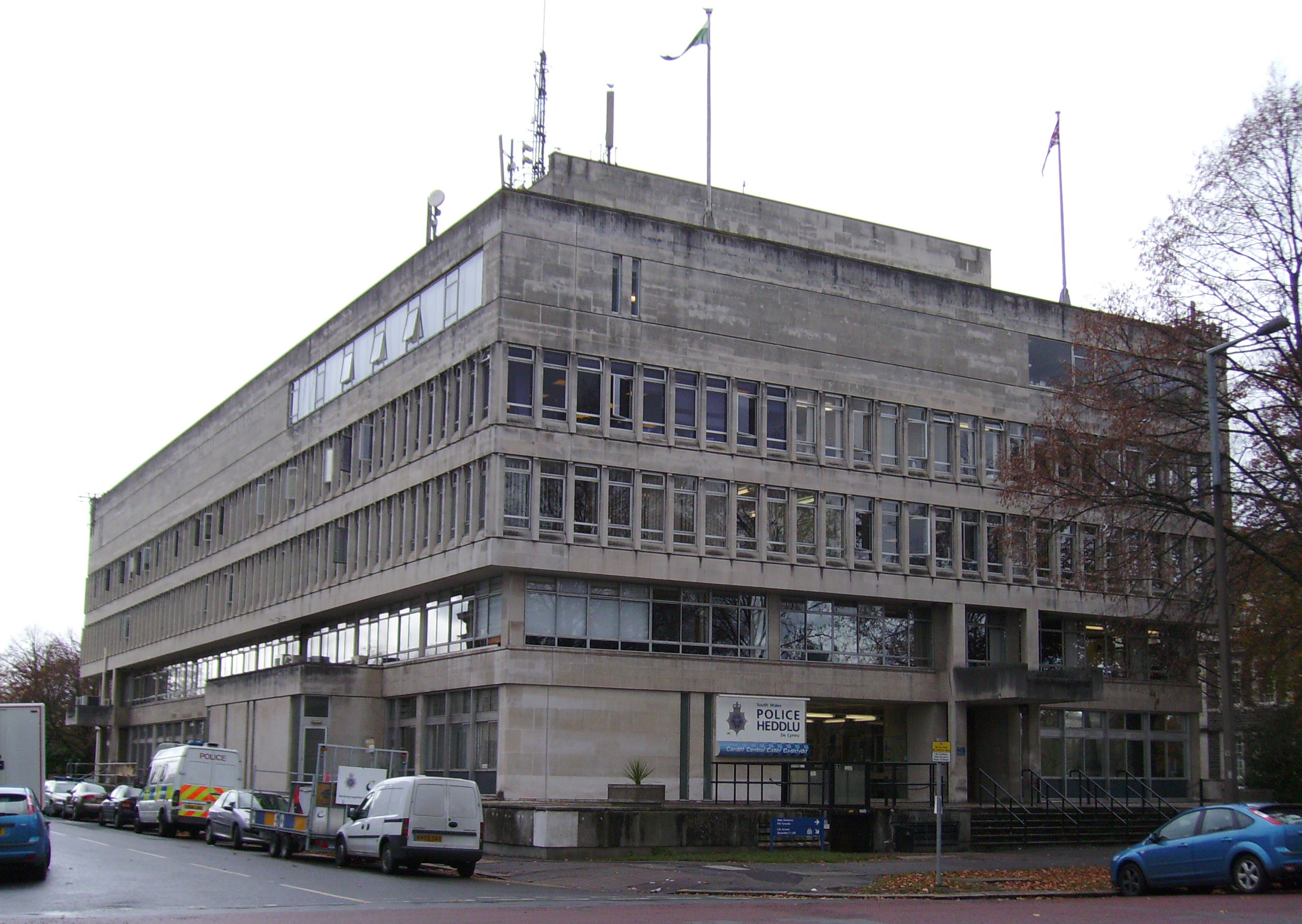
Cardiff Central police station

Cardiff Central police station (Welsh: Gorsaf heddlu Canol Caerdydd) is a 20th-century police station located in Cathays Park in the centre of Cardiff, Wales. Previously the South Wales Police's Eastern Division headquarters, the police station is currently responsible for policing the city centre.

== Description ==
The current five storey Cardiff Central police station was designed by Cardiff's city architect John Dryburgh and built on the southern corner of Cathays Park between 1966 and 1968. It is described as "The most successful post-war building in Cathays Park" and the only post-war building in the area "to be both modern and majestic". The detention facilities at the station were inadequate with only 4 cells. These were replaced by 60 cells at the new Cardiff Bay police station, which opened in 2009.

Running costs of Cardiff Central in 2011 was £1 million, with a £9.1 million refurbishment planned for 2015–16.

Previously open until midnight from Sunday to Thursday and until 4am on Fridays and Saturdays, as of 2017, the opening hours are 8am to 6pm.
