= University of Wales Registry =

University headquarters in Wales

Coordinates: 51.486°N 3.182°W

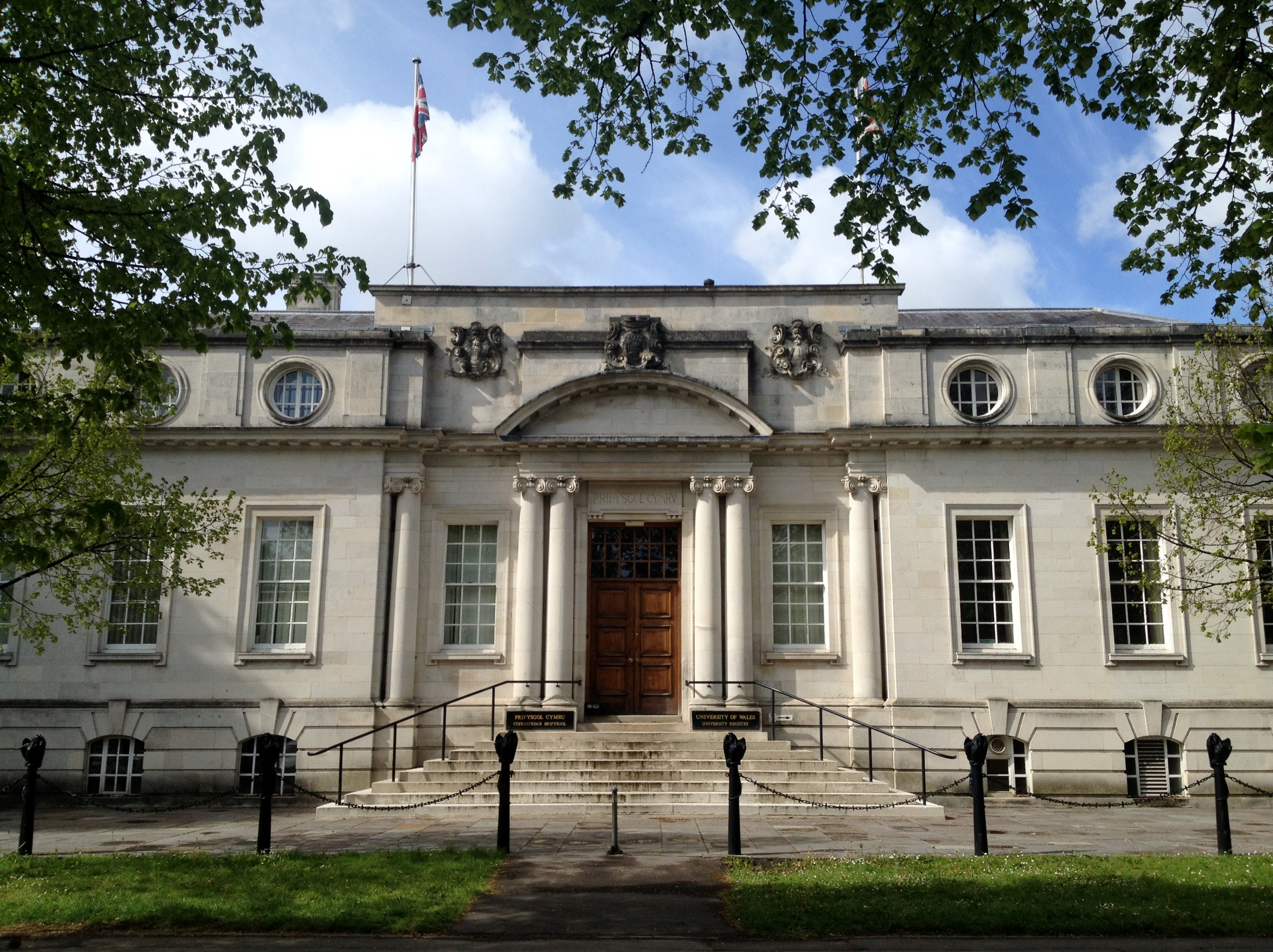
- Interactive map of the University of Wales Registry area

General information
- Architectural style: English Renaissance
- Location: Cardiff; Wales
- Construction started: 1903
- Completed: 1904
- Client: University of Wales

Design and construction
- Architect: H.W. Wills

The University of Wales Registry (Welsh: Cofrestrfa Prifysgol Cymru) is the administrative headquarters of the University of Wales, located in Cathays Park, Cardiff, Wales.

The University of Wales was a confederal University founded in 1893. It functioned as the degree-awarding authority for its member institutions and existed to support their academic activities. Following a series of controversies, it was decided in 2011 to merge the university with the University of Wales Trinity Saint David. As of August 2017, the two universities were fully integrated but the merger had not been legally finalised.

The Registry is located on King Edward VII Avenue in Cathays Park, Cardiff's Civic Centre. It became a Grade II listed building on 25 January 1966.

== The Building ==
In 1902 the Cardiff Corporation reached an agreement with the University of Wales to locate their main administrative office in Cathays Park, and gifted the land to the university, along with £6,000 for the erection of a building whose designs met their approval. Designs were invited, and that by Glamorgan architect H.W. Wills was selected. The foundation stone was laid in 1903 and the building was completed in the next year. It was the first building to open in Cathays Park, and remains the smallest.

The building is in an English Renaissance style, and dressed in portland stone, in common with the other buildings of Cathays Park. It is composed of three bays on each side of a central portion, and is a single storey. In front of the building there are a series of iron posts, capped with dragon sculptures by Welsh sculptor Goscombe John.

In 1933 an extension was added to the rear of the building, designed by Thomas Alwyn Lloyd.
