= Capita Property and Infrastructure =

UK multidisciplinary consultancy firm

- Industry: Engineering and Construction
- Predecessor: Capita Symonds (Capita Property Consultancy Ltd and Symonds Group)
- Founded: 1960
- Successor: WSP
- Number of employees: 4,500
- Parent: WSP

Capita Property and Infrastructure (previously Capita Symonds) was a UK multidisciplinary consultancy operating in the building design, civil engineering, environment, management and transport sectors, then part of the Capita Group. They employed around 4,500 staff in 50 offices, across the UK and Ireland.

Capita Architecture, Capita Bobrowski, Capita Lovejoy, Capita Pearce Buckle, MMB and Andrew Martin Associates were all Capita Symonds brands.

In 2022 Capita sold Capita Real Estate & Infrastructure Ltd, together with its GL Hearn business, to WSP. The Capita Real Estate & Infrastructure entity was formed from a large part of the Capita Property and Infrastructure business with the Capita Property and Infrastructure entity remaining in Capita group and managing a residue of strategic partnership contracts including those with Barnet Council and North Tyneside Council.

== History ==
Symonds was established in 1960 and Capita was formed within the Chartered Institute of Public Finance and Accountancy in 1984.

In 1995, Symonds acquired Travers Morgan - expanding into transport, engineering and environmental consultancy services.

Capita Symonds originated as a merger of Capita Property Consultancy Ltd and Symonds Group, following the acquisition of Symonds by Capita in 2004. Capita's property companies had been combined into one organisation in 1998, initially named Capita Property Services Ltd.

In 1999 Capita Property Services acquired the companies MPM Adams and Edward Roscoe Associates. In 2001/2 they formed strategic partnerships with Cumbria County Council, Blackburn with Darwen Borough Council and four Welsh local authorities.

Following the formation of Capita Symonds, between 2004 and 2012 they acquired the following companies:

- Percy Thomas Architects (2004)
- Norman and Dawbarn (2005)
- Buchanan Consulting Engineers (2005)
- Ruddle Wilkinson Architects (2006)
- Church Lukas Limited (Birmingham office) (2006)
- Lovejoy (2008)
- NRM Bobrowski (2008)
- Pearce Buckle (2008)
- MMB Associates (2009)
- Andrew Martin Associates (AMA) (2009)
- Multi-Tech Contracts Ltd (2009)
- Inventures (2010)
- Northcroft (2012)

Strategic partnerships were formed with Salford City Council, Southampton City Council, Swindon Borough Council and Sefton Metropolitan Borough Council.

In 2007 the architectural services were combined into a Capita Architecture brand.

In October 2013 Capita Symonds was renamed Capita Property & Infrastructure Ltd and was marketed as just Capita.

== Projects ==
- The BBC Hoddinott Hall (2008), Phase 2 of the Wales Millennium Centre, was designed by Capita Architecture.
- Capita Symonds provided the architectural and engineering design services for the new Cardiff Bay divisional headquarters (2009) for South Wales Police.
- Capita Symonds provided project management services for the construction of the Colin Atkinson Pavilion at Somerset County Cricket Club (2010)
