= Welsh National War Memorial =

War memorial in Cardiff, Wales

- Cofeb Ryfel Genedlaethol Cymru
- Cardiff Council
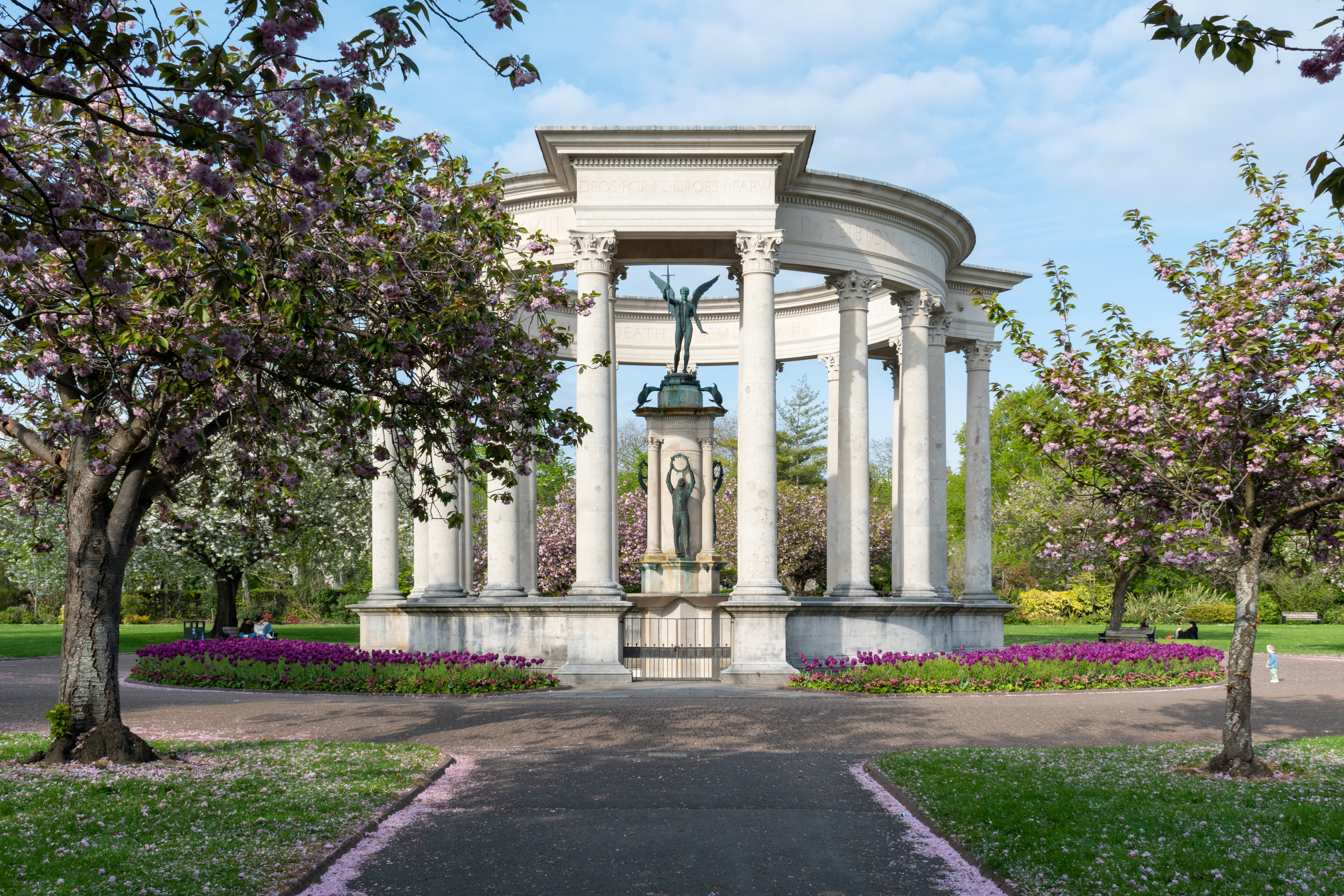
- For Welsh soldiers who fought in World War I and World War II
- Unveiled: 12 June 1928; 98 years ago
- Location: 51.48658°N 3.18041°W; Cathays Park, Cardiff
- Designed by: Sir Ninian Comper
- Outer frieze I feibion Cymru a roddes eu bywyd dros eu gwlad yn Rhyfel MCMXIV–MCMXVIII ('To the sons of Wales who gave their lives for their country in the war of 1914–1918'); Inner frieze Remember here in peace those who in tumult of war by sea, on land, in air, for us and for our victory endureth unto death Above figures In hoc signo vinces

Listed Building – Grade II*
- Official name: Welsh National War Memorial
- Designated: 25 January 1966; 60 years ago
- Reference no.: 13742

The Welsh National War Memorial (Welsh: Cofeb Ryfel Genedlaethol Cymru) is situated in Alexandra Gardens, Cathays Park, Cardiff. The memorial was designed by Sir Ninian Comper and unveiled on 12 June 1928 by the Prince of Wales. The memorial commemorates the servicemen who died during the First World War and has a commemorative plaque for those who died during the Second World War, added in 1949.

== Design and construction ==
Welsh National War Memorial statues

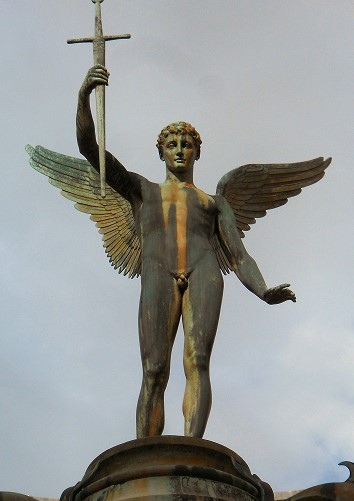
Victory on top of the central stone pylon

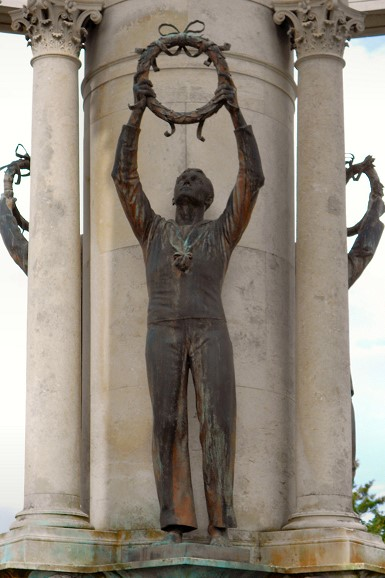
Sailor (Navy) surrounding the central stone pylon

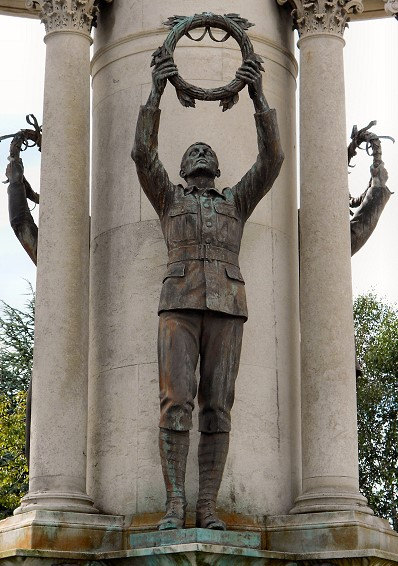
Soldier (Army) surrounding the central stone pylon

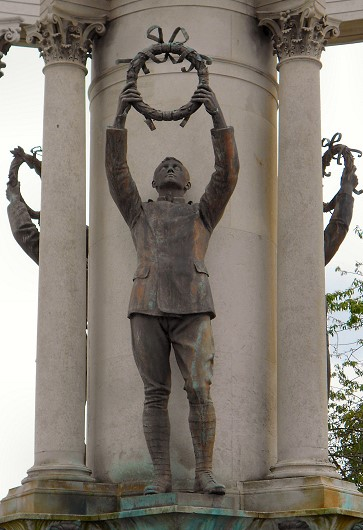
Airman (Air Force) surrounding the central stone pylon

The memorial was first suggested in 1917. However, detailed proposals were not established until October 1919 when the Western Mail created a national subscription fund and a committee set up to manage the scheme. There were four designs submitted to the committee and the design selected was by Sir Ninian Comper and approved in 1924. The sculpture was by Henry Alfred Pegram. The stone masons were William Drinkwater Gough and Messrs E. Turner & Sons. The bronze statues were cast by A. B. Burton. The memorial is the only secular work by Comper, who was primarily a furnisher of churches. He received much hostility, from the president of the Royal Institute of British Architects and others, for not being a qualified architect, but was supported by the sculptors Sir William Goscombe John and Sir Hamo Thornycroft.

The memorial takes the form of a circular colonnade surrounding a sunken court. On the frieze above the columns are inscriptions in Welsh, on the outer side, and in English, on the inner side. The English inscription was composed by Comper himself. At the centre of the court is a group of three bronze sculptures arranged around a stone pylon. Around the base stand three figures, a soldier, sailor and airman, holding wreaths aloft. There are appropriate inscriptions above the figures, e.g., "Over the sea he went to die" above the sailor. Above them, crowning the structure, is a winged male nude representing Victory.

The memorial's form was inspired by two visits to French North Africa and particularly Tunisia, where the architect was inspired by the public works erected by the emperor Hadrian. In order for Pegram to find a model for the bronzes, the crews of two battleships were invited to the Union Jack Club in Waterloo, London. The sculptor selected a young sailor called Frederick William Baker, an Englishman from Brixton, in the nude and in uniform.

The memorial was unveiled on 12 June 1928 by Edward, Prince of Wales. The ceremony was broadcast by the nascent BBC.

The Memorial is Grade II* listed.

== See also ==
- South African War Memorial, Cardiff

== Sources ==
- Symondson, Anthony; Bucknall, Stephen (2006). Sir Ninian Comper: An introduction to his life and work with complete gazetteer. Reading: Spire Books.
