= Cathays Park =

Civic centre area in Cardiff, Wales

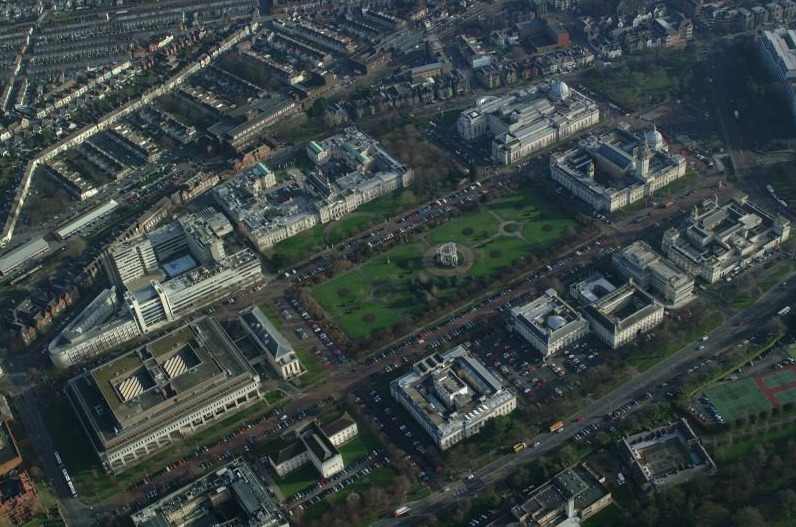
- Aerial view of Cathays Park
- Interactive map of Cathays Park
- Type: Civic centre
- Location: Cardiff, Wales
- Coordinates: 51.4866°N 3.1804°W
- Created: Early 20th century buildings

Cathays Park (Welsh: Parc Cathays) or Cardiff Civic Centre is a civic centre area in the city centre of Cardiff, the capital city of Wales, consisting of a number of early 20th century buildings and a central park area, Alexandra Gardens. It includes Edwardian buildings such as the Temple of Peace, City Hall, the National Museum and Gallery of Wales and several buildings belonging to the Cardiff University campus. It also includes Cardiff Crown Court, the administrative headquarters of the Welsh Government, and the more modern Cardiff Central police station. The Pevsner architectural guide to the historic county of Glamorgan judges Cathays Park to be "the finest civic centre in the British Isles". The area falls within the Cathays electoral ward and forms part of the Cathays Park Conservation Area, which was designated in 1975.

== History ==
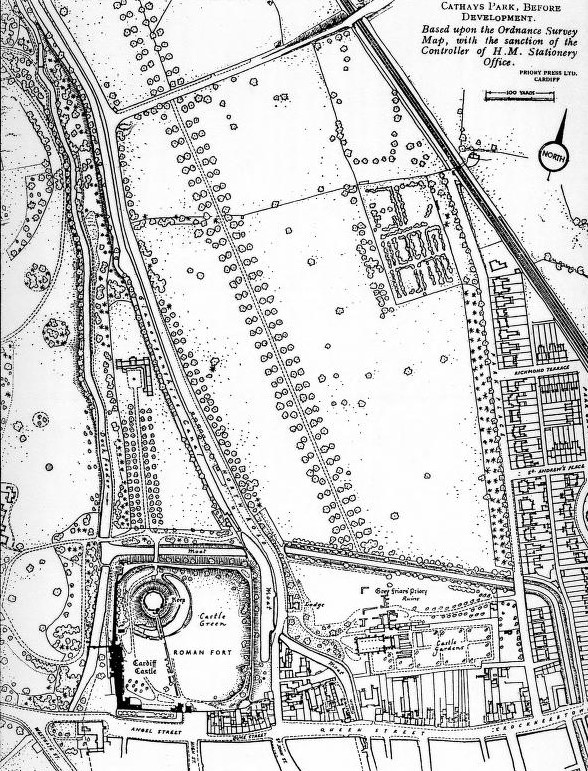
Cathays Park before the development of the Civic Centre

Cathays Park was formerly part of Cardiff Castle grounds. The present day character of the area owes much to successive holders of the title the Marquess of Bute, and especially the 3rd Marquess of Bute, an extremely wealthy landowner, and to his gardener, Andrew Pettigrew. The Butes acquired much of the lands in Cathays through investment and by inheritance through a marriage to Charlotte Windsor in 1766.

The idea of acquiring the Cathays House park as an open public space was raised in 1858 and again in 1875. In 1887 it was suggested the park could commemorate Queen Victoria's Golden Jubilee. Negotiations did not begin until 1892, when Lord Bute agreed to sell 38 acres for £120,000 (equivalent to £17 million in 2024). The idea of relocating the Town Hall to the park was controversial, but it was also proposed to locate a new University College building there.

On 14 December 1898, the local council bought the entire 59 acres (24 ha) of land for £161,000 from the Marquess of Bute (equivalent to £22 million in 2024). As part of the sale, the 3rd Marquis of Bute placed strict conditions on how the land was to be developed. The area was to be used for civic, cultural and educational purposes, and the avenues were to be preserved.

A six-month Cardiff Fine Arts, Industrial and Maritime Exhibition which included specially constructed boating lake, a wooden cycling track and an electric railway was held in 1896.

=== The Development of the Civic Centre ===
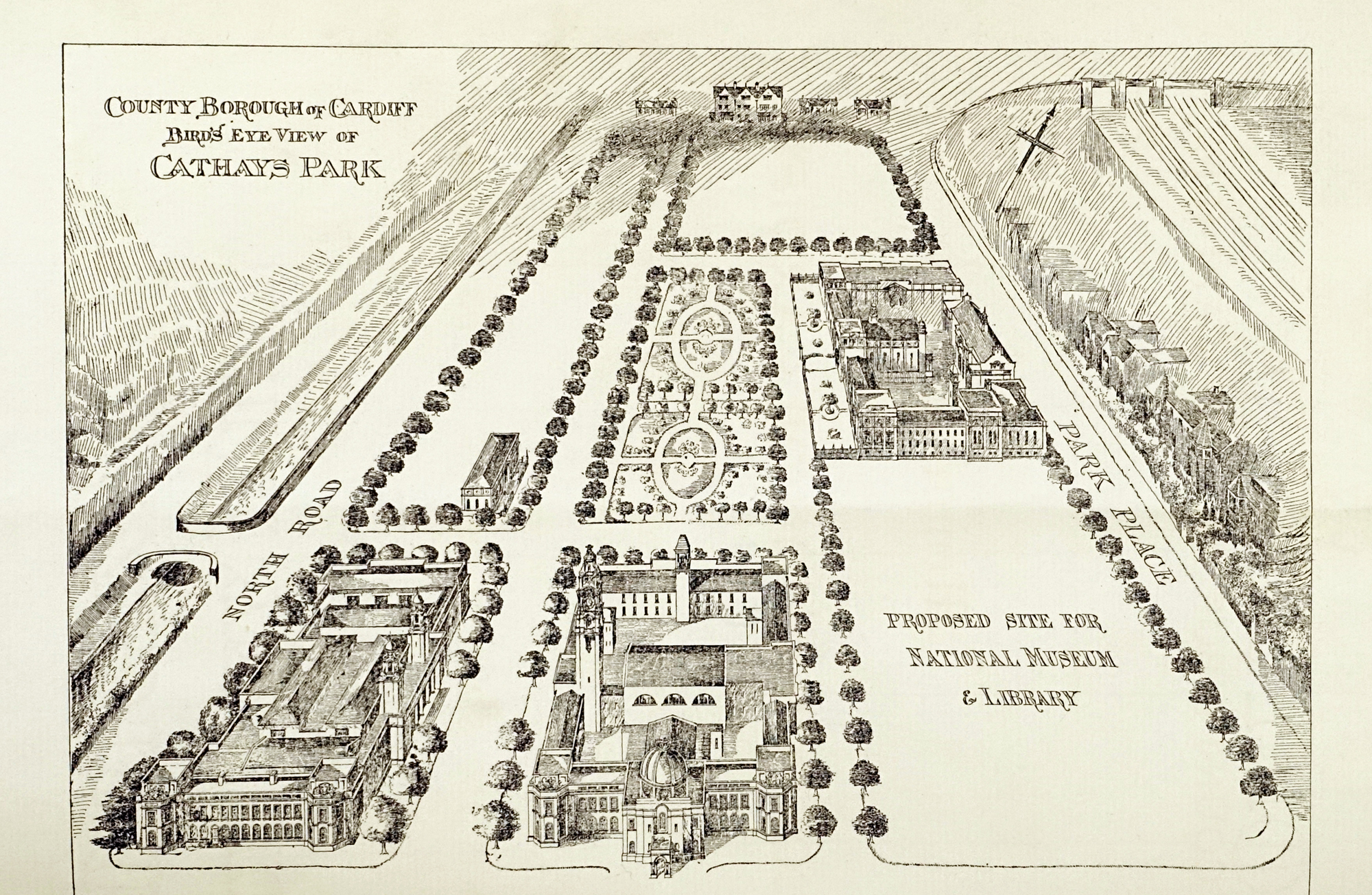
Cathays Park and the site of the proposed National Museum & Library in 1905

Cathays Park has had three very distinct phases of development, the first phase was built in the Edwardian Baroque style, which consisted of the University of Wales Registry, Cardiff University main building, Cardiff Crown Court, Glamorgan County Hall, Cardiff City Hall, National Museum Cardiff which was constructed from 1912, but only opened in 1927 due to World War I. The second phase was built in a more simplified classical design of the Temple of Peace, Cathays Park 1, Cardiff Technical College, now Bute Building.

The four-storey maximum rule which was imposed by the local authority to ensure that no building in Cathays Park overshadowed the City Hall was removed. This led to the third phase of building from the 1960s, which although built in Portland stone as with the rest of the buildings in Cathays Park, was in a modernist architectural style. These included the seven-storey Biosciences building, in 1967, the twelve storey Tower building. Other buildings constructed included the Redwood Building for the University of Wales Institute of Science and Technology, Cardiff Central police station, Law Building and Cathays Park 2.

At the start of the first phase in 1897 a competition was held for a complex comprising Law Courts and a Town Hall, with Alfred Waterhouse, architect of the Natural History Museum in London, as judge. The winners were the firm of Lanchester, Stewart and Rickards, who would later go on to design the Methodist Central Hall in Westminster. These were the first two buildings of the ensemble, and have an almost uniform façade treatment. The east and west pavilions of both façades are identical in design, except for the attic storeys, which are decorated with allegorical sculptural groups. On the Crown Court these are Science and Industry, sculpted by Donald McGill, and Commerce and Industry, by Paul Raphael Montford, while on the City Hall are Music and Poetry by Paul Montford and Unity and Patriotism by Henry Poole. The courts and the town hall were followed by the main building of the University College of South Wales and Monmouthshire (now Cardiff University), designed by W. D. Caröe and completed in 1905.

The third plot on the site facing City Hall lawn went empty until 1910, when the competition for a National Museum of Wales was won by the architects Arnold Dunbar Smith and Cecil Brewer. The design parts from the Edwardian Baroque of the Law Courts and City Hall and is more akin to American Beaux-Arts architecture, particularly in the entrance hall where a similarity to McKim, Mead and White's later Metropolitan Museum of Art in New York City has been noted. The Museum site was not bounded to the north by an avenue so there were scarcely any limits on the depth of the building; the 1910 plan was almost twice as deep as it was broad. The First World War, however, ensured that progress on the building was very slow. By 1927 part of the East range, with the lecture theatre funded by William Reardon Smith, was complete. Further extensions came only in the 1960s and 1990s; these remained faithful to the original design on the exterior (and included sculpture by Dhruva Mistry) but are of a neutral character on the inside.

The final plots in the north of the park were occupied by government offices and university departments. The foundations for a governmental office block were laid in 1914, but work ceased almost immediately due to World War I. Construction of the Crown Buildings (now Cathays Park 1) was undertaken between 1932-38, initially as a headquarters for the Welsh Board of Health. This was followed in the 1970s by Cathays Park 2, a vast administrative block for the Welsh Office. Although the architect and town planner, John B. Hilling, in his study Black Gold, White City: The History and Architecture of Cardiff Civic Centre published in 2016, acknowledged the architects' efforts to respect Cathays Park 2's surroundings, by use of a symmetrical plan laid out on a clear axis, the building's Brutalist style has been much criticised. Both Hilling and the architectural historian John Newman quote the judgement of the Architects' Journal; "a perversely appropriate symbol of closed inaccessible government" [suggesting] a bureaucracy under siege". Cathays Park 1 and 2 have seen 'Cathays Park' become used as a metonym, firstly for the Welsh Office, and after devolution in 1999, for the Welsh Government's civil servants and ministerial offices.

The last plot on the site was occupied by the University of Wales, which constructed a series of university departments, laboratories and schools on the site from the 1950s to the very early 21st century. The development has been criticised as being too dense, the university's appetite for accommodation outdoing the limitations of the site. Dewi-Prys Thomas, the first professor of architecture at the University of Wales, expressed dismay at, "the injury done to the Civic Centre, with the colossal pile of buildings thrusting up against the main University College."

=== Appreciation ===
In his Glamorgan volume of the Pevsner Buildings of Wales series, Newman described Cathays Park as "the finest civic centre in the British Isles". Later studies generally concur. Hilling considered the park "an outstanding example of an architectural ensemble which illustrates a significant stage in Welsh history". (Note: In his study, Hilling recorded one of the few dissenting voices; the critic Ian Nairn attacked Cathays as, "a stone zoo, one weary neo-Classical hulk after another, lumped together on a regular grid... an utterly alien model for urban improvement".) Professor Ian Morley, historian of the built environment, considered that Cathays was "matchless in terms of quality and meaning, [and helped] Cardiff punch well above its weight in terms of demographic stature". Revisiting the subject in his 2018 revised The Architecture of Wales: from the first to the twenty-first century, Hilling agreed, contending that Cathays validated, "as much as anything, [Cardiff]'s claim to city status and national capital". (Note: Hilling does make some criticisms of the 21st century development of the site: in addition to expressing concern as to the random and incoherent siting of the memorials; he notes the visual impact caused by the removal of many trees from the park and the proliferation of television aerials and telecommunications masts on many buildings; and questions the city council's decision to operate a winter funfair on the City Hall Lawns, "resulting in a visual blight for more than four months each year".)

== Buildings ==
Key to heritage status
Status	Criteria
I	Grade I listed. Building of exceptional interest, sometimes considered to be internationally important
II*	Grade II* listed. Particularly important building of more than special interest
II	Grade II listed. Building of national importance and special interest

Buildings and structures	Listed building status	Architect	Year opened	Image
Aberdare Hall	II	W. D. Caröe	1895	
Sir Martin Evans Building and Tower Building	No listing	Dale Owen / Percy Thomas Partnership	1968	
Black Box	No listing	Alex Gordon	1966 (demolished 1992)	
Bute Building	II	Percy Thomas and Ivor Jones	1916	
Cardiff Central Police Station	No listing	John Dryburgh	1968	
Cardiff Crown Court	I	Lanchester, Stewart and Rickards	1906	
Law Building	No listing	Percy Thomas Partnership	1963	
Cardiff University main building	II*	W. D. Caröe	1905	
City Hall	I	Lanchester, Stewart and Rickards	1906	
Cathays Park 1 (part of the Crown Buildings complex)	II	P. K. Hanton	1938	
Cathays Park 2 (part of the Crown Buildings complex)	No listing	Alex Gordon	1979	
Glamorgan Building (former Glamorgan County Council building)	I	Vincent Harris and Thomas Anderson Moodie	1912	
Hut in Gorsedd Gardens	II	Not known	Not known	
Music Building	No listing	Alex Gordon	1971	
National Museum and Gallery of Wales	I	Arnold Dunbar Smith and Cecil Brewer	1927	
Public conveniences on Museum Avenue	II	Cardiff City Council's architect’s department	Early 1930s	
Redwood Building (Welsh School of Pharmacy)	No listing	Percy Thomas	1961	
Temple of Peace	II	Percy Thomas	1938	
University of Wales, Registry	II	H. W. Wills	1904 (Enlarged 1933 by T Alwyn Lloyd)	
Welsh National War Memorial	II*	Ninian Comper	1928	

== Gardens ==
Cathays Park gardens
- Interactive map of Cathays Park gardens

Cadw/ICOMOS Register of Parks and Gardens of Special Historic Interest in Wales
- Official name: Cathays Park (Alexandra Gardens, Gorsedd Gardens, Friary Gardens)
- Designated: 1 February 2022; 4 years ago
- Reference no.: PGW(Gm)26(CDF)
- Listing: Grade II

In addition to the large lawn in front of the City Hall, Cathays Park includes three formal gardens and a tree lined park. Main phases of construction of the gardens were from 1903 to 1906 and from 1924 to 1928. The gardens are grade II on the Register of Parks and Gardens of Special Historic Interest in Wales. All of the spaces are within conservation areas and many of the surrounding buildings are listed. The open spaces are very important to the image of the city. Several important buildings overlook these well kept spaces. Each of the three gardens has its own very different character and each retains its original layout. The later 20th and 21st centuries have seen the erection of a large number of memorials in the park which have generated some criticism; John Hilling attacked the "ill-considered and uncoordinated way [the monuments are] scattered across the gardens".

The formal gardens in Cathays Park

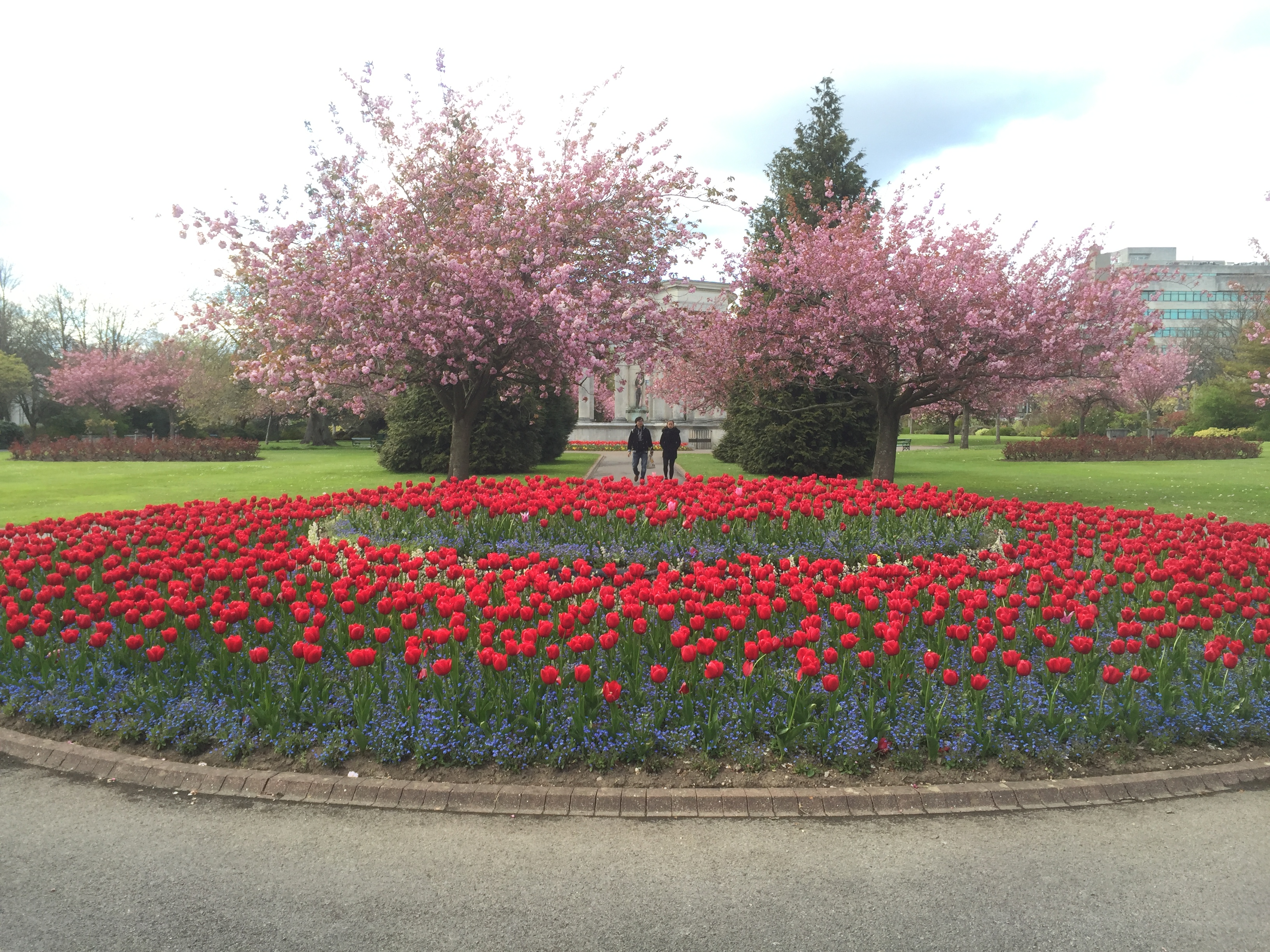
Alexandra Gardens with the Welsh National War Memorial in the background

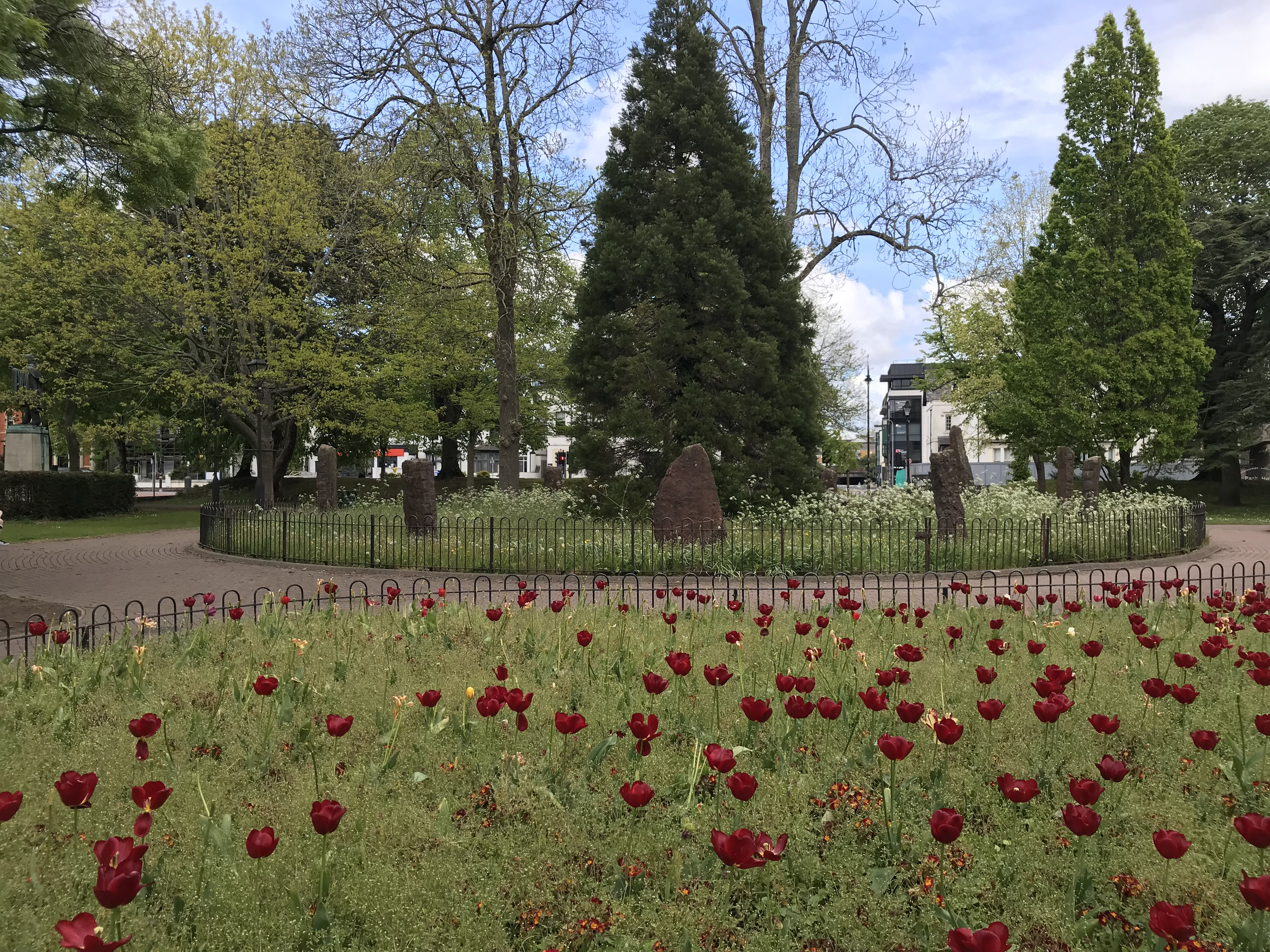
Gorsedd Gardens with Gorsedd stones in the background

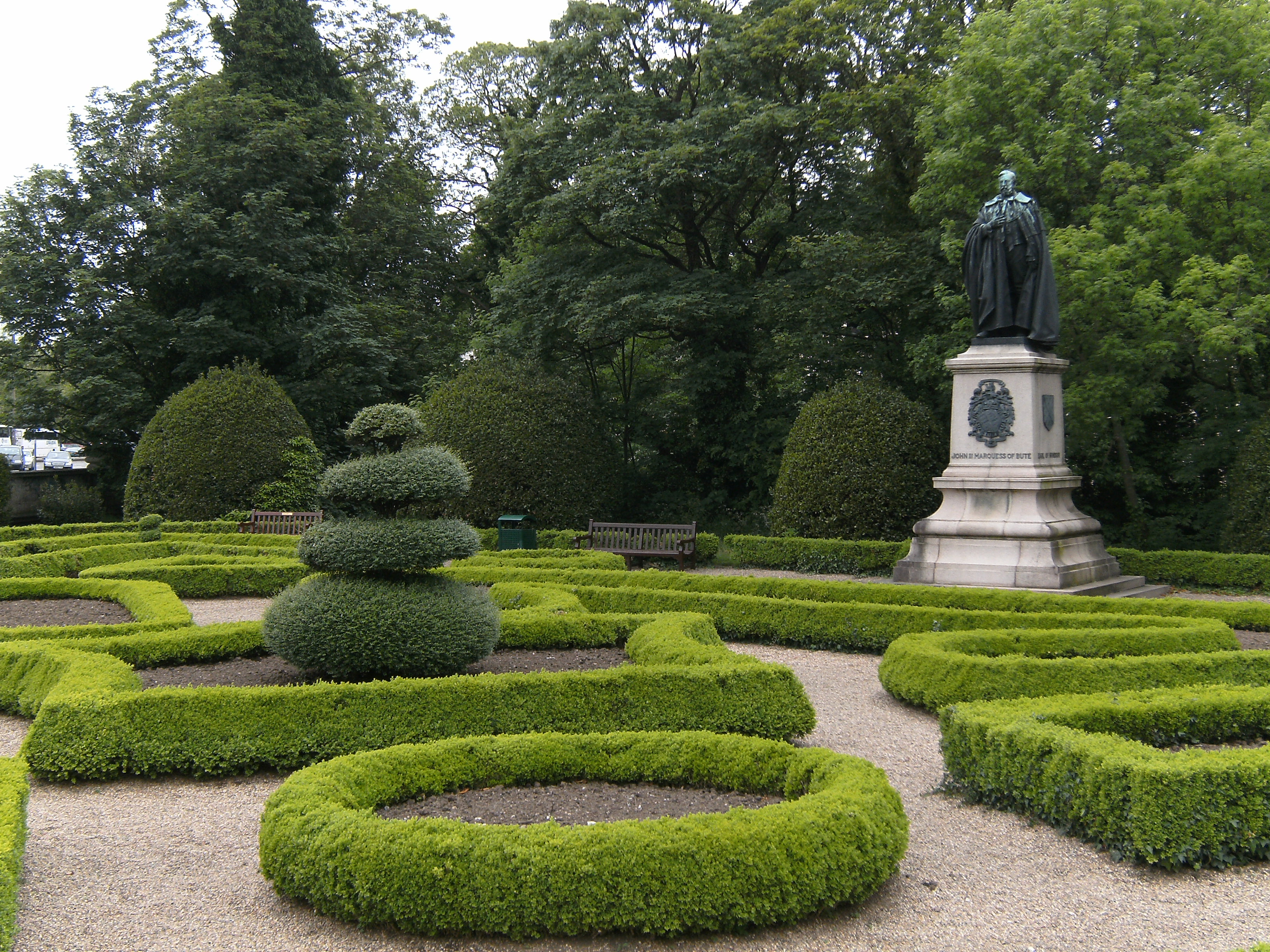
Friary Gardens with a statue of the 3rd Marquess of Bute to the right

=== Alexandra Gardens ===
Named after Alexandra of Denmark, the queen consort of Edward VII. The gardens were first called University Gardens, and were laid out and planted in 1903. Alexandra Gardens is 5 acres (2.0 ha) garden located at the heart of the civic centre. It consists of maintained flower beds and grass, with the Welsh National War Memorial standing at its centre. Alexandra Gardens has been protected since September 2019 as a Centenary Fields, which is a Fields in Trust scheme together with the Royal British Legion, which protects green spaces containing a war memorial that honours the memory of those that lost their lives in World War I.

=== Gorsedd Gardens ===
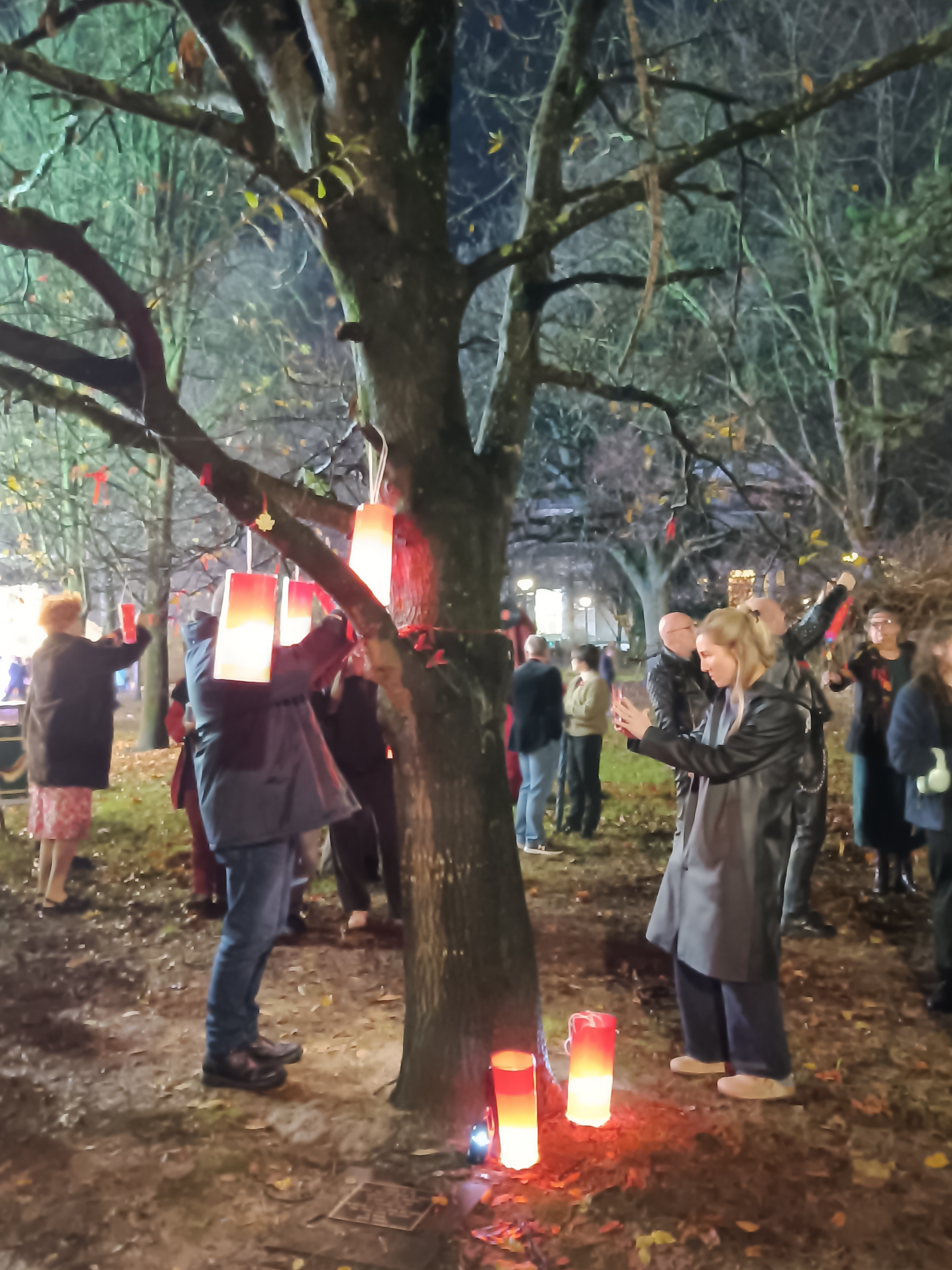
Dressing the tree of life in Gorsedd Gardens, on World AIDS Day 2024

The garden was originally known as Druidical Gardens, but the name Gorsedd Gardens was later adopted. The 2 acres (0.81 ha) garden has as its centrepiece a stone circle constructed in 1899, when the National Eisteddfod of Wales was held in Cardiff. The stones were originally erected elsewhere in Cathays Park for the National Eisteddfod of 1899. They were re-erected in the garden in 1905. The garden's name refers to the Gorsedd of Welsh Bards, the ceremonial order that governs the Eisteddfod. Work on the landscaped gardens began in 1904 and officially opened in July 1910 by the Lord Mayor. It is laid out with lawns, and tree and shrub borders and hedges. The gardens has statues of subjects including David Lloyd George and Lord Ninian Crichton-Stuart. A gardeners' hut in the gardens has been converted to a coffee outlet.

The Gorsedd Gardens also contain a "tree of life" planted on World AIDS Day, 1 December 1994, to commemorate "all those who have lost their lives to AIDS in Wales". The original plaque was replaced at the 2021 World AIDS Day commemoration event. The tree is the focus for yearly World AIDS Day commemorations, with people attaching red ribbons to the tree. The tree was also the location of Cardiff's vigil after the murder of Brianna Ghey in February 2022.

=== Friary Gardens ===
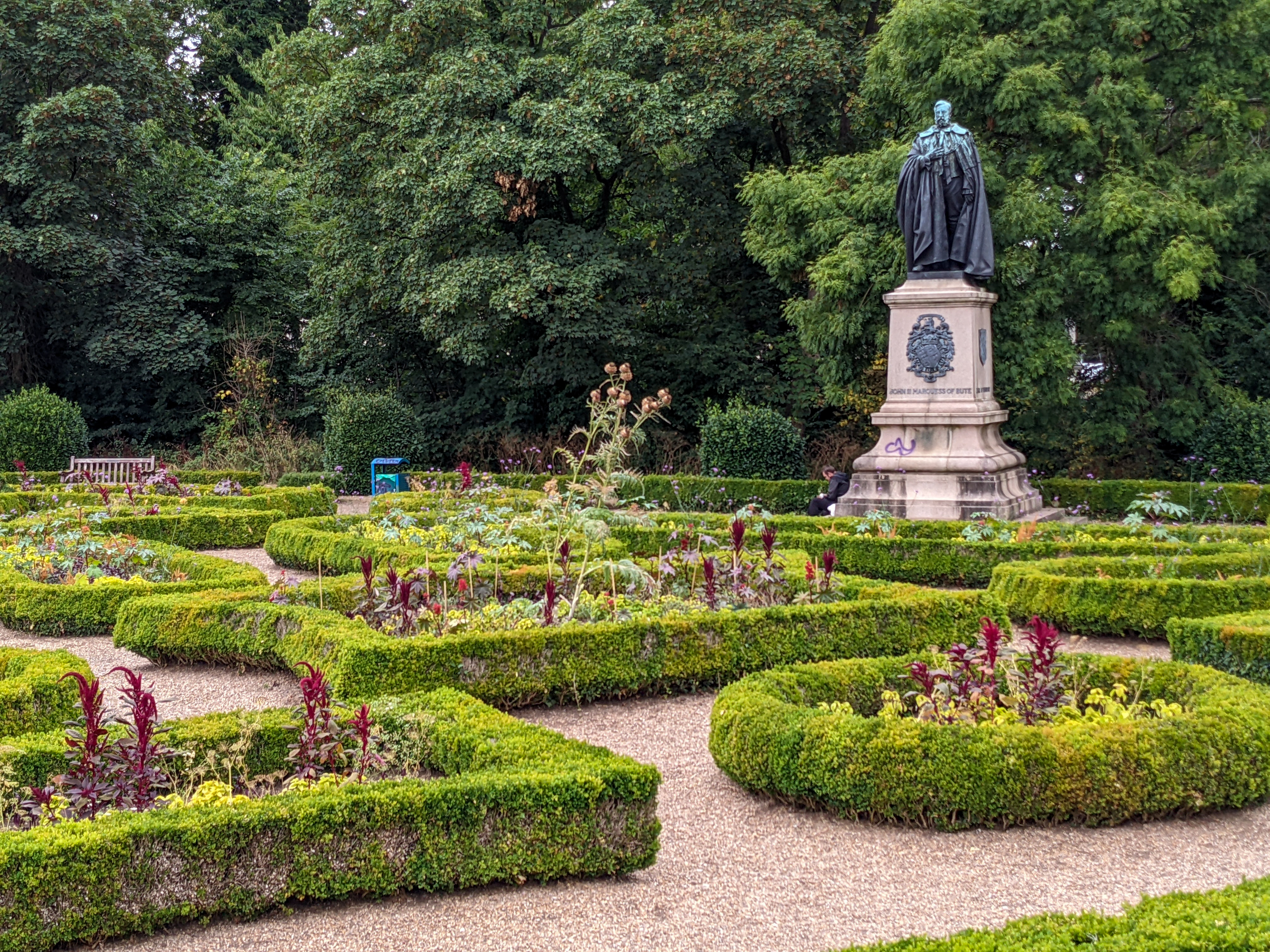
Statue honouring the 3rd Marquess of Bute in Friary Gardens

Friary Gardens is a 1 acre (0.40 ha) triangular formal garden, which was established as a Dutch garden. One of the strict conditions of the sale of Cathays Park by the 3rd Marquess of Bute was that the trees must be preserved and that no buildings should ever be built on the site of the gardens. Work began in the autumn of 1904 and was completed by 27 September 1905, when it was handed over to the Parks Committee, although not opened to the public until 1910. For many years the gardens were known as the Dutch Garden. In 1923 the Parks Committee decided to rename it Priory Gardens. However, this name was historically incorrect and in 1928 the Parks Committee renamed it as the Friary Gardens.

It contains a statue constructed in honour of the 3rd Marquess of Bute by James Pittendrigh Macgillivray and erected in 1928. The gardens were originally part of Greyfriars and was sometimes known as a Priory or a Friary as it was a Franciscan friary. The friary is believed to have been founded by the Grey Friars around 1280. The Greyfriars were also known as the Friars Minor and the Franciscans. Greyfriars was demolished by order of Henry VIII in approximately 1540 as part of the dissolution of the monasteries.

=== Queen Anne Square, Parc Mackenzie, City Hall Lawns and former Crown Gardens ===
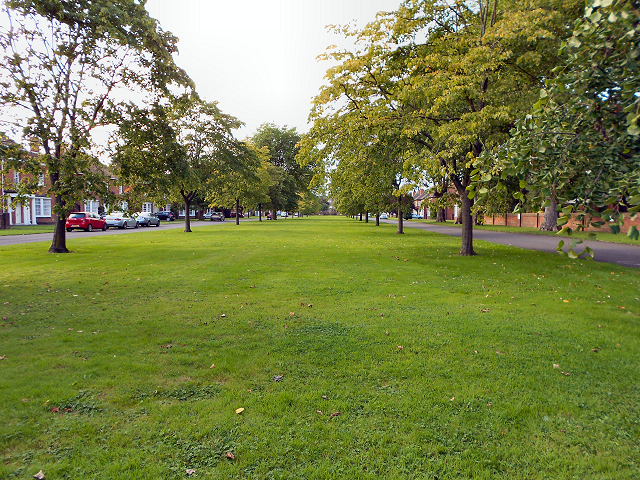
Queen Anne Square

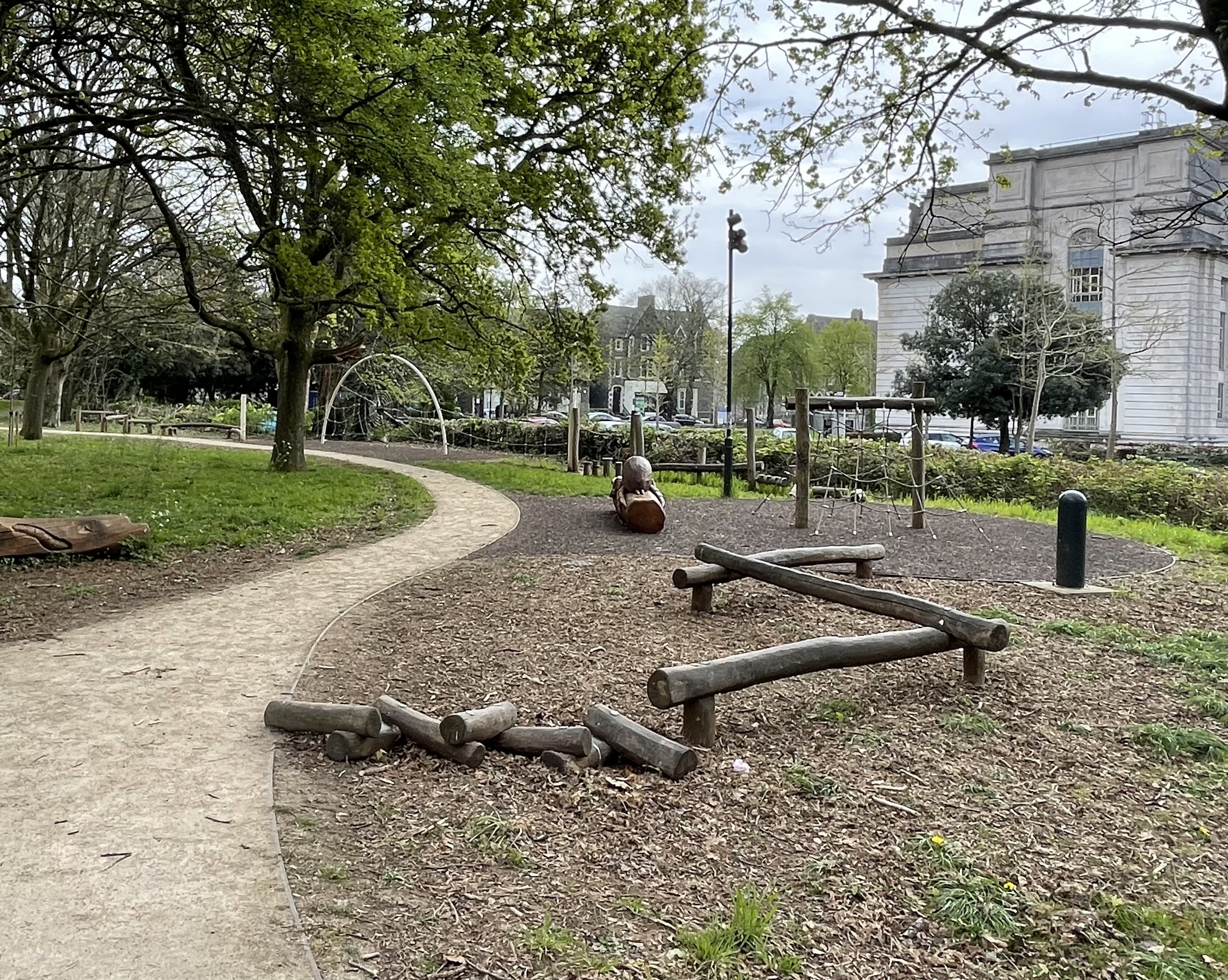
Parc Mackenzie

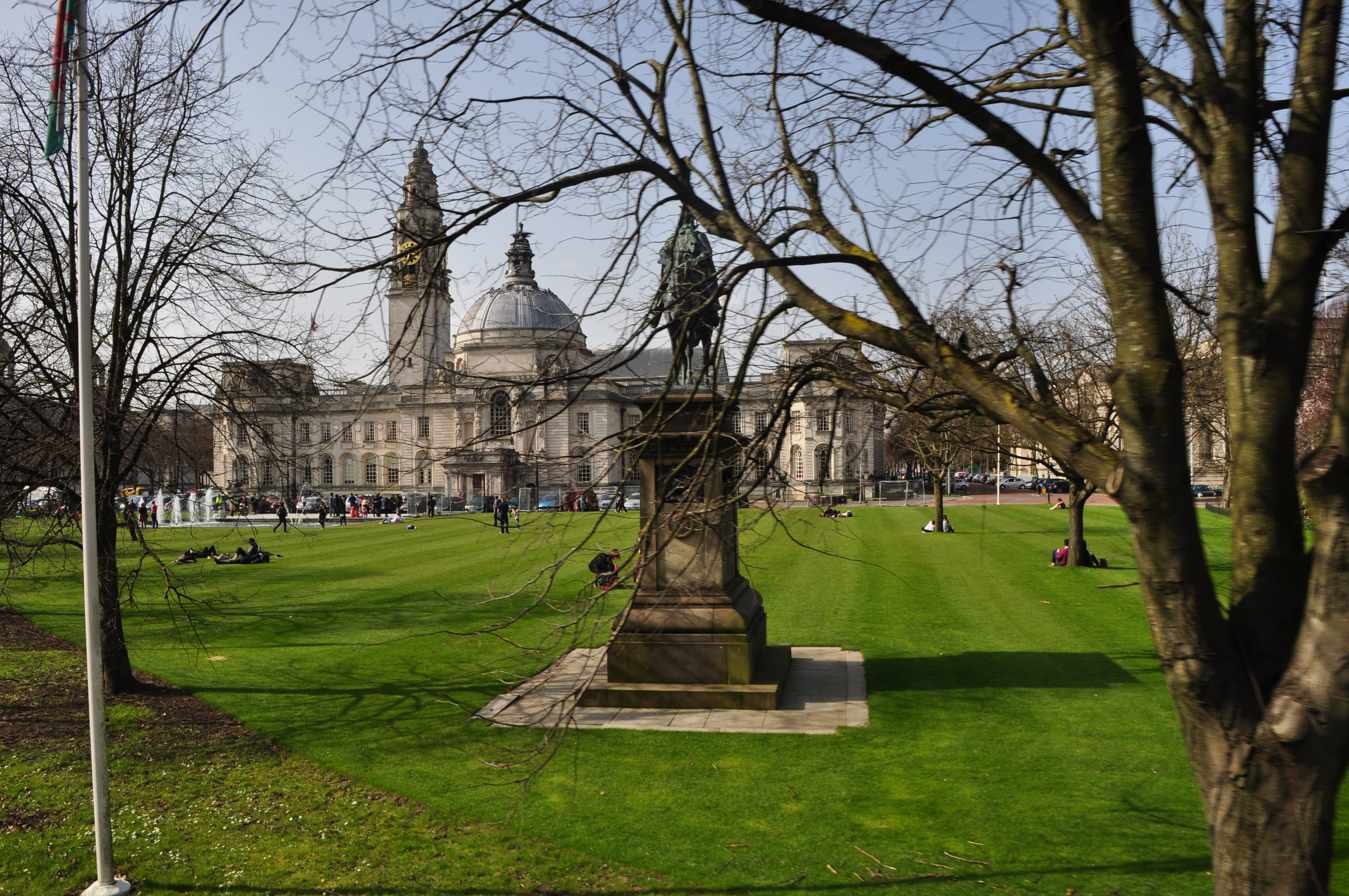
City Hall Lawns

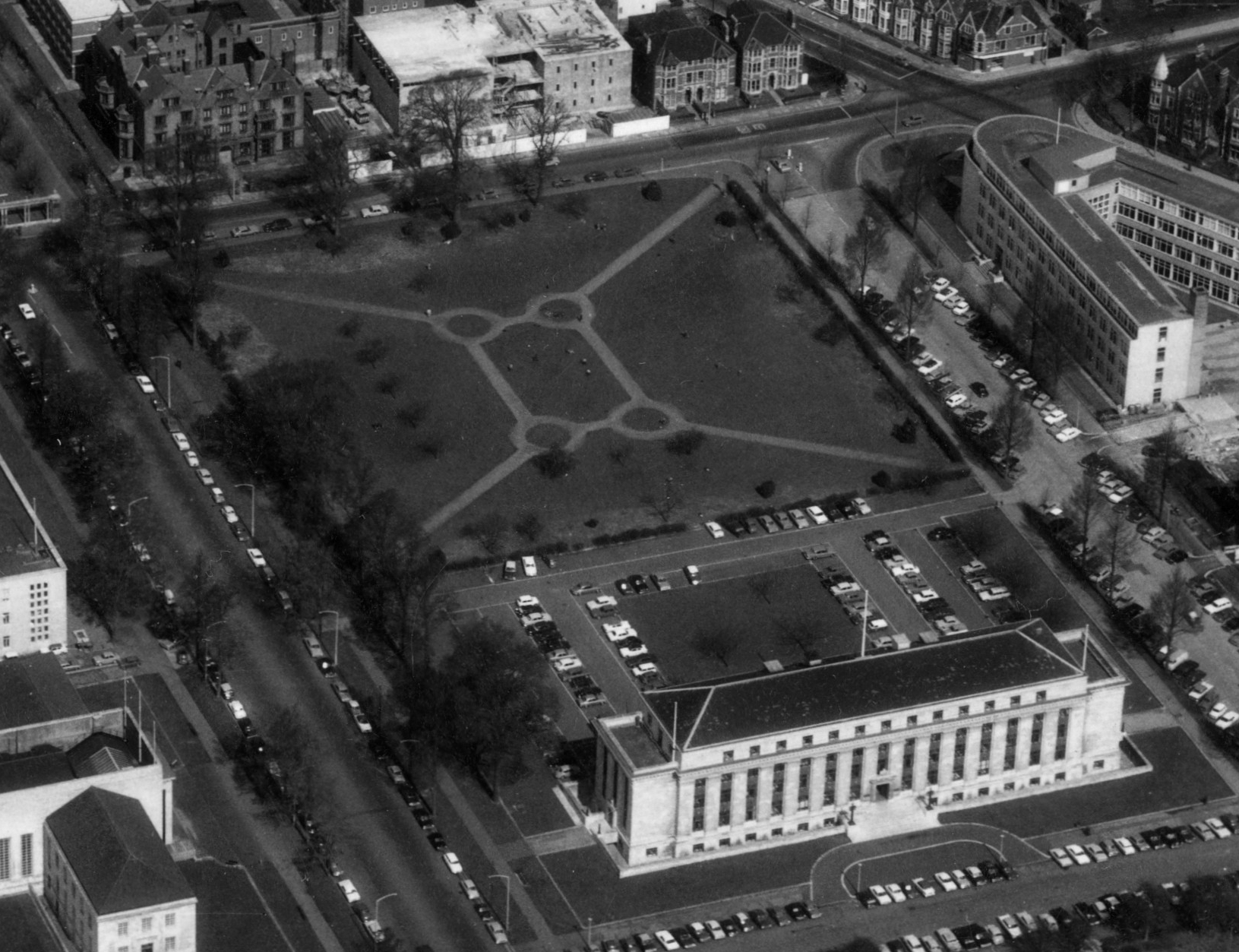
The former Crown Gardens

Queen Anne Square at the very north end of the park, is a tree-lined grass square with domestic houses which was built in the 1930s and 1950s. It was designed to be aligned with the main thoroughfare of King Edward VII Avenue, on a site that was originally planned for a Welsh Parliament House. The square is enclosed by a tree-lined no through road, by Corbett Road to the south and by Aberdare Hall to the south east.

Parc Mackenzie, which lies between the University of Wales main block and the National Museum, is the newest area of green space to be created within the park. Opened in 2023, it commemorates Millicent Mackenzie (1863–1942), the first woman professor in Wales. At the Alexandra Gardens end of the Parc Mackenzie plot stands a Grade II listed public convenience. Long disused and derelict, in 2024 planning permission was granted for its conversion into a cafe.

The City Hall Lawns have a low pool with a triple spout fountain which faces the City Hall. The fountains were created to mark the investiture of Prince Charles as Prince of Wales in July 1969. The lawns are used for temporary events, such as Cardiff's annual Winter Wonderland and previously as part of the Cardiff Big Weekend.

The Crown Gardens were formal gardens located to the north of the old Crown Buildings, now called Cathays Park I. The Gardens were built over from 1972 through to 1979 which became the new Crown Buildings, now called Cathays Park II.

== Sculpture ==
Name	Sculptor	Date	Listed statues status	Image
Statue of Third Marquess of Bute	James Pittendrigh Macgillivray	Early 20th century	II	
Statue of John Cory	Goscombe John	1906	II	
Statue of Lord Aberdare	Herbert Hampton	1898	II	
Statue of Lord Ninian Edward Crichton Stuart	Goscombe John	1917	II	
Statue of David Lloyd George	Michael Rizzello	1960	II	
Statue of Godfrey, First Viscount Tredegar	Goscombe John	1909	II	
Statue of Judge Gwilym Williams of Miskin	Goscombe John	c. 1906	II	
South African War Memorial also known as the Boer War Memorial	Albert Toft	1909	II*	
Statue of Girl in Gorsedd Gardens	Robert Thomas	2005	No listing	
Three Obliques (Walk In); Sculpture in forecourt of the Music Building	Dame Barbara Hepworth	1968	II	
Relief Sculpture on Redwood Building	Edward Bainbridge Copnall	1961	No listing	
Mind's Eye; Relief sculpture on the Tower lecture theatre	Peter Randall-Page	2006–2007	No listing	

== Memorial stones ==
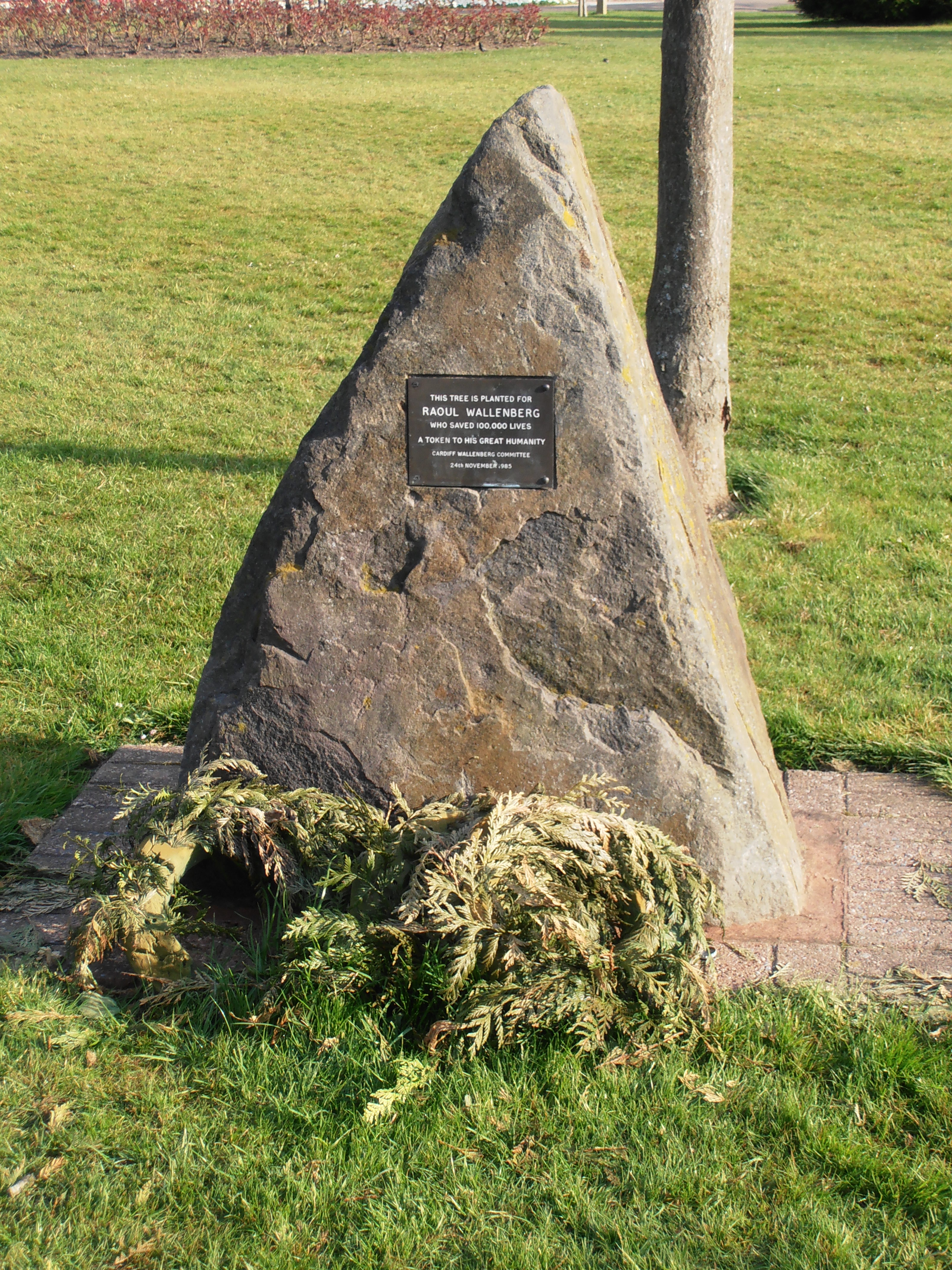
Raoul Wallenberg, a Swedish diplomat who, towards the end of WWII saved the lives of up to 100,000 Jews. Unveiled on 24 November 1985.

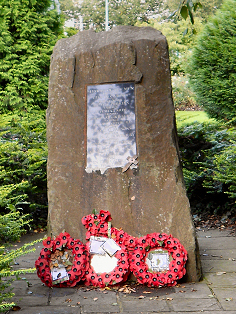
Cardiff City Falklands Conflict Memorial for the 7 servicemen from Cardiff who died during the Falklands War.

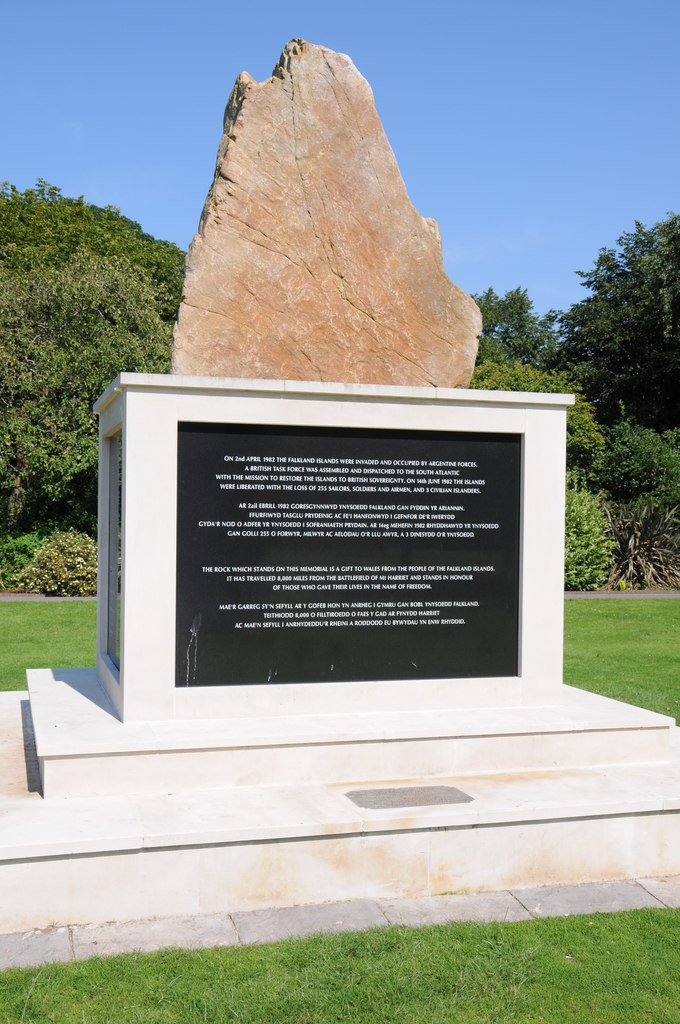
The Welsh National Falklands Conflict Memorial. Unveiled on 30 September 2007

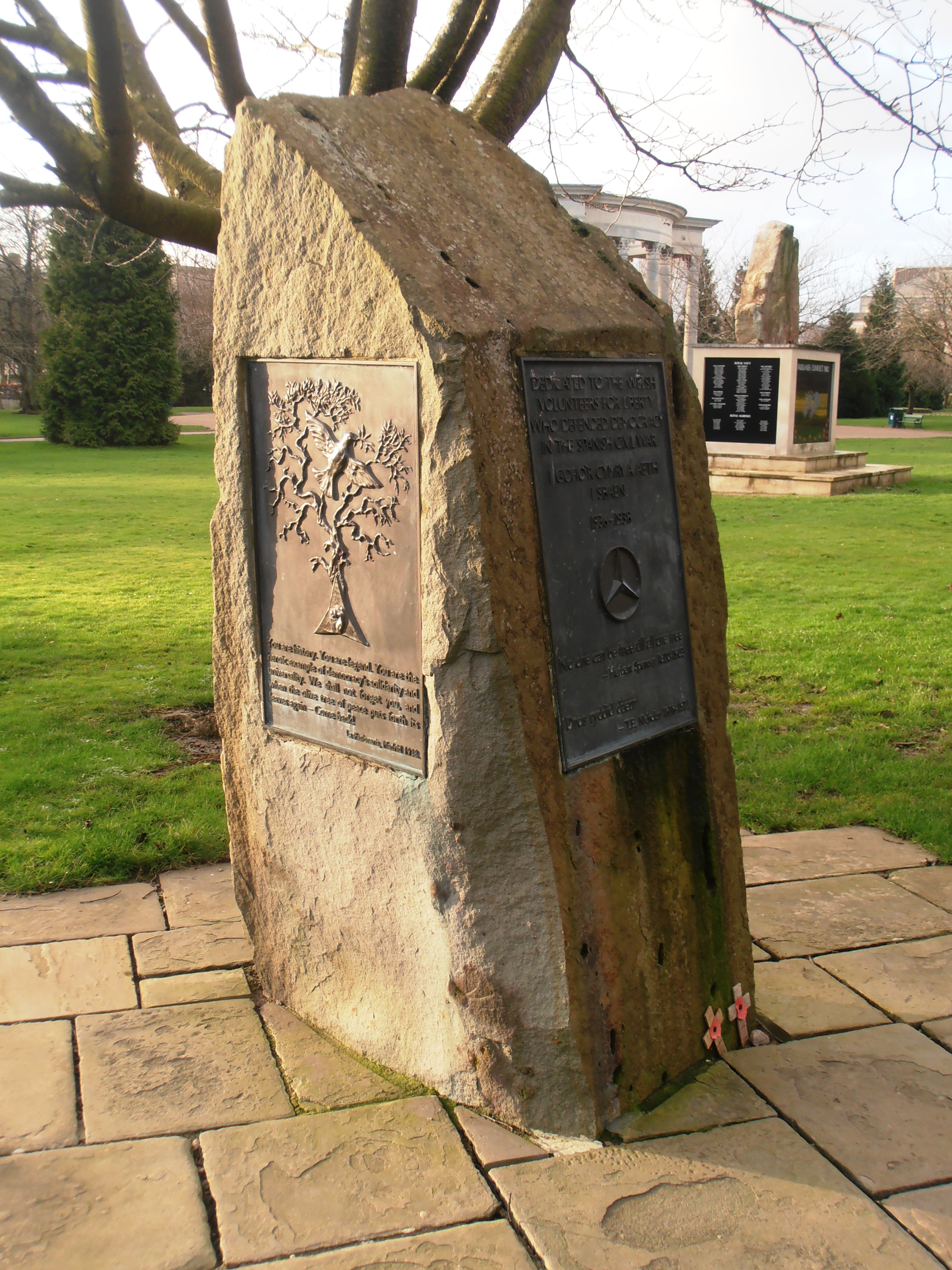
Memorial for those who fought in the International Brigade during the Spanish Civil War, which was unveiled in October 1992.

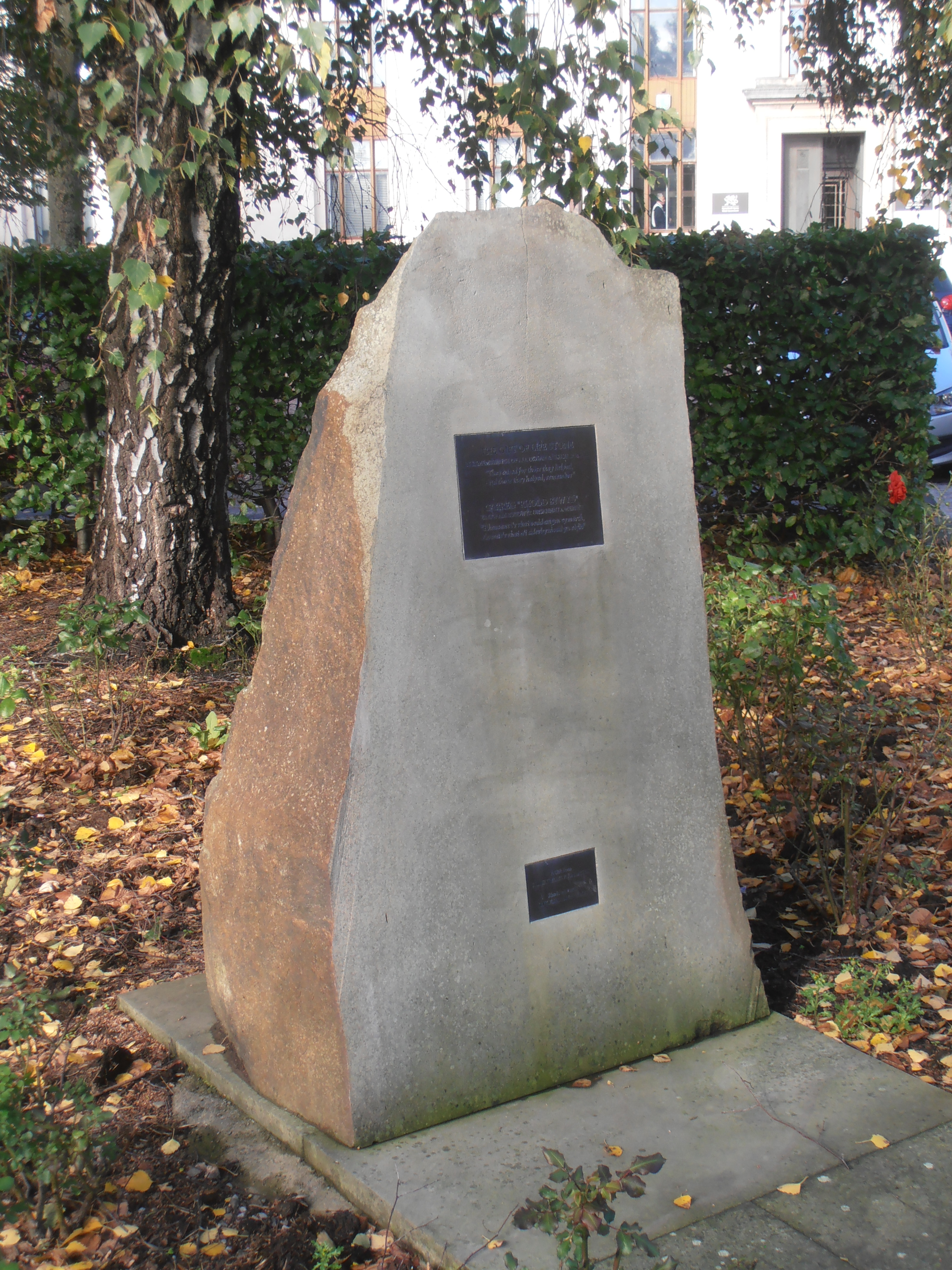
The Gift of Life Stone memorial stone dedicated to organ donors. Erected in 2007 by Kidney Wales.

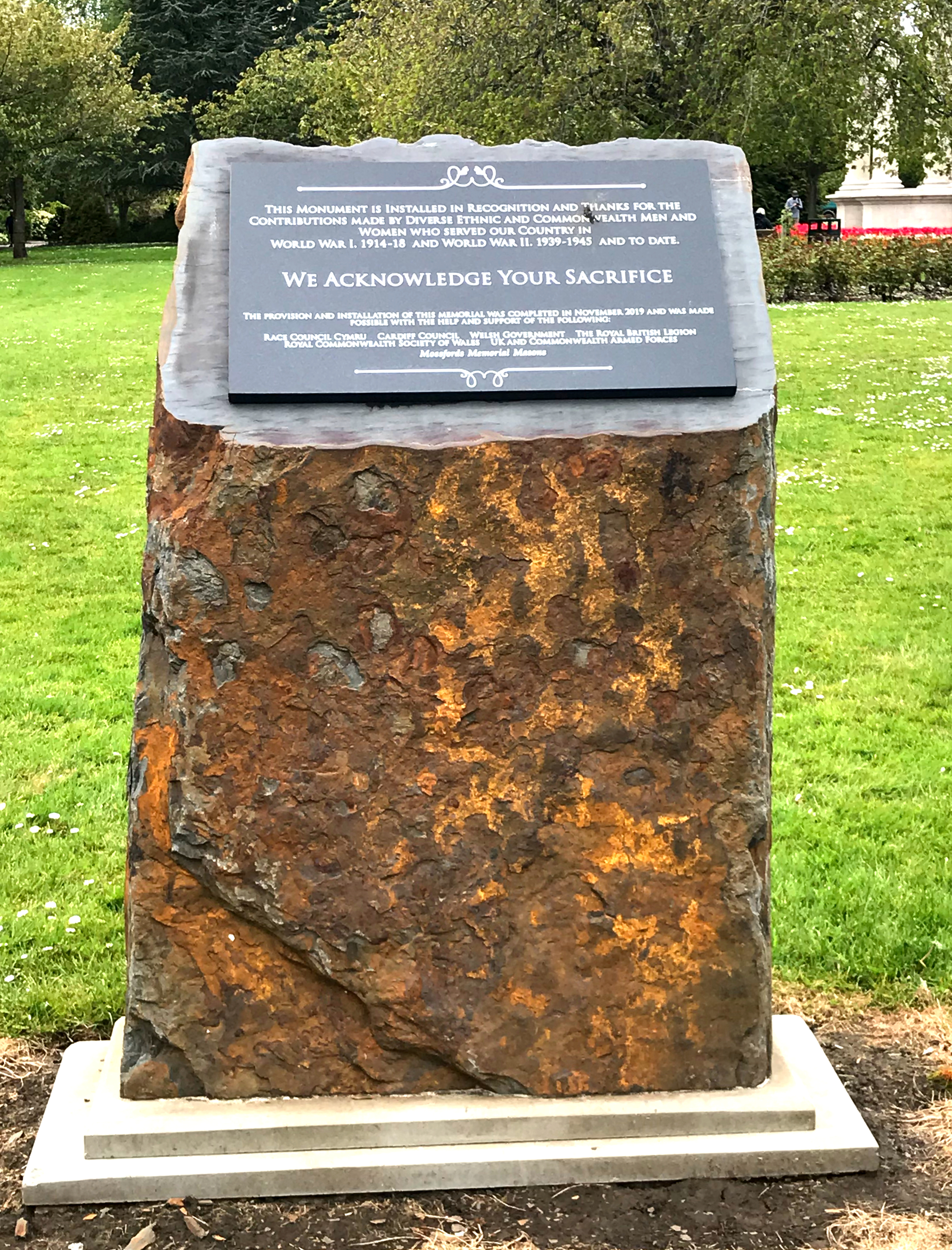
Monument for the contribution made by ethnic men & women during WW1, WW2 and subsequent conflicts. Unveiled on 2 November 2019

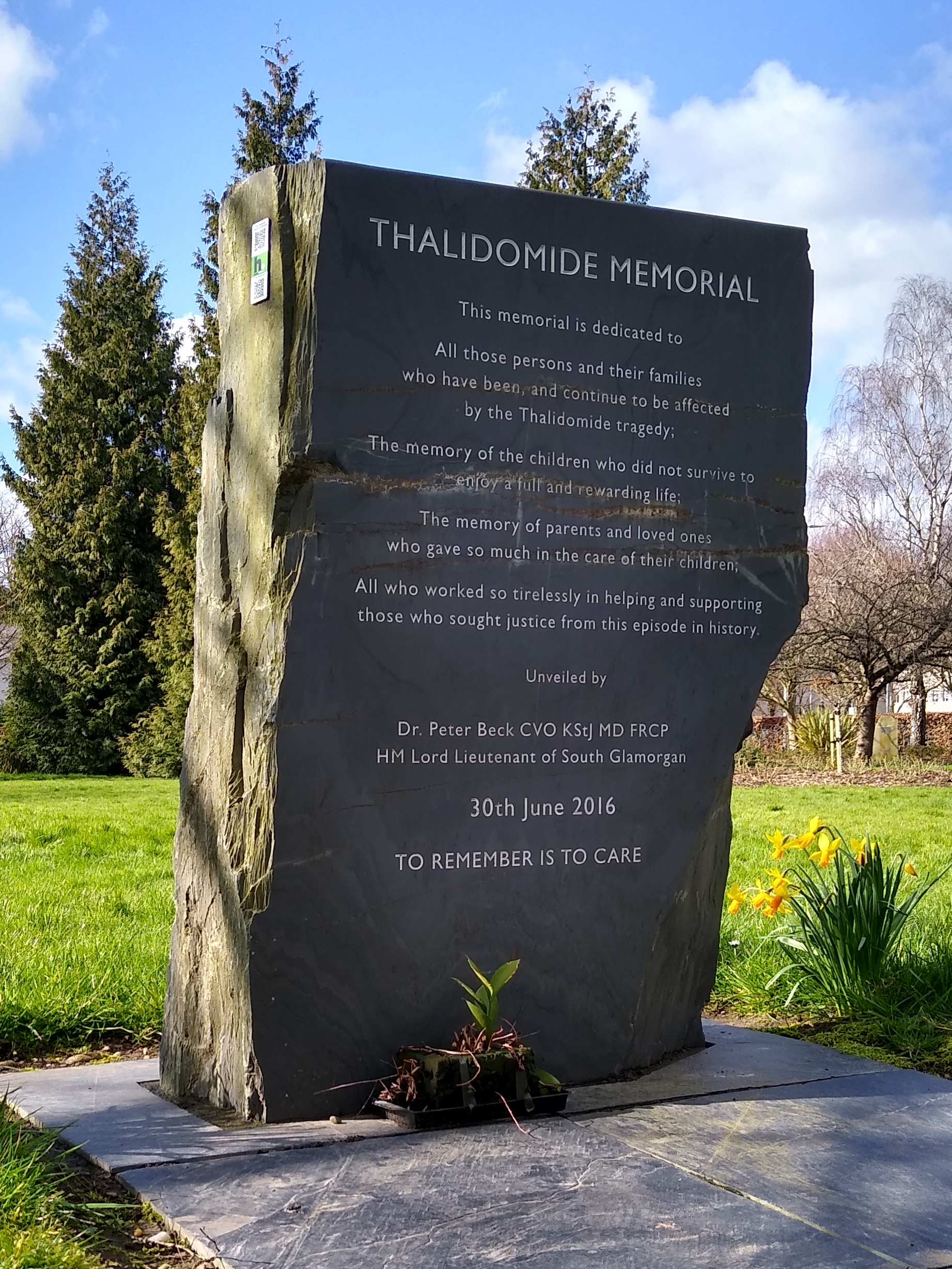
Memorial to mark the lives and achievements of Thalidomide impaired people in the UK. Unveiled on 30 June 2016.

== Gates, colonnades and obelisks ==
Official listed name	Listing status	Image
Forecourt Walls to University of Wales Main Block	II*	
Colonnade and gateways at south end of Queen Anne Square	II	
Pair of Obelisk Lamp Stands to west of City Hall; Pair of Obelisk Lamp Stands to south west of City Hall; Pair of Obelisk Lamp Stands to south east of City Hall; Pair of Obelisk Lamp Stands to south west of Crown Court; Pair of Obelisk Lamp Stands to south east of Crown Court	II	
