= Crown Buildings, Cathays Park =

Welsh Government offices in Cardiff

Coordinates: 51.48832°N 3.18262°W

The Crown Buildings

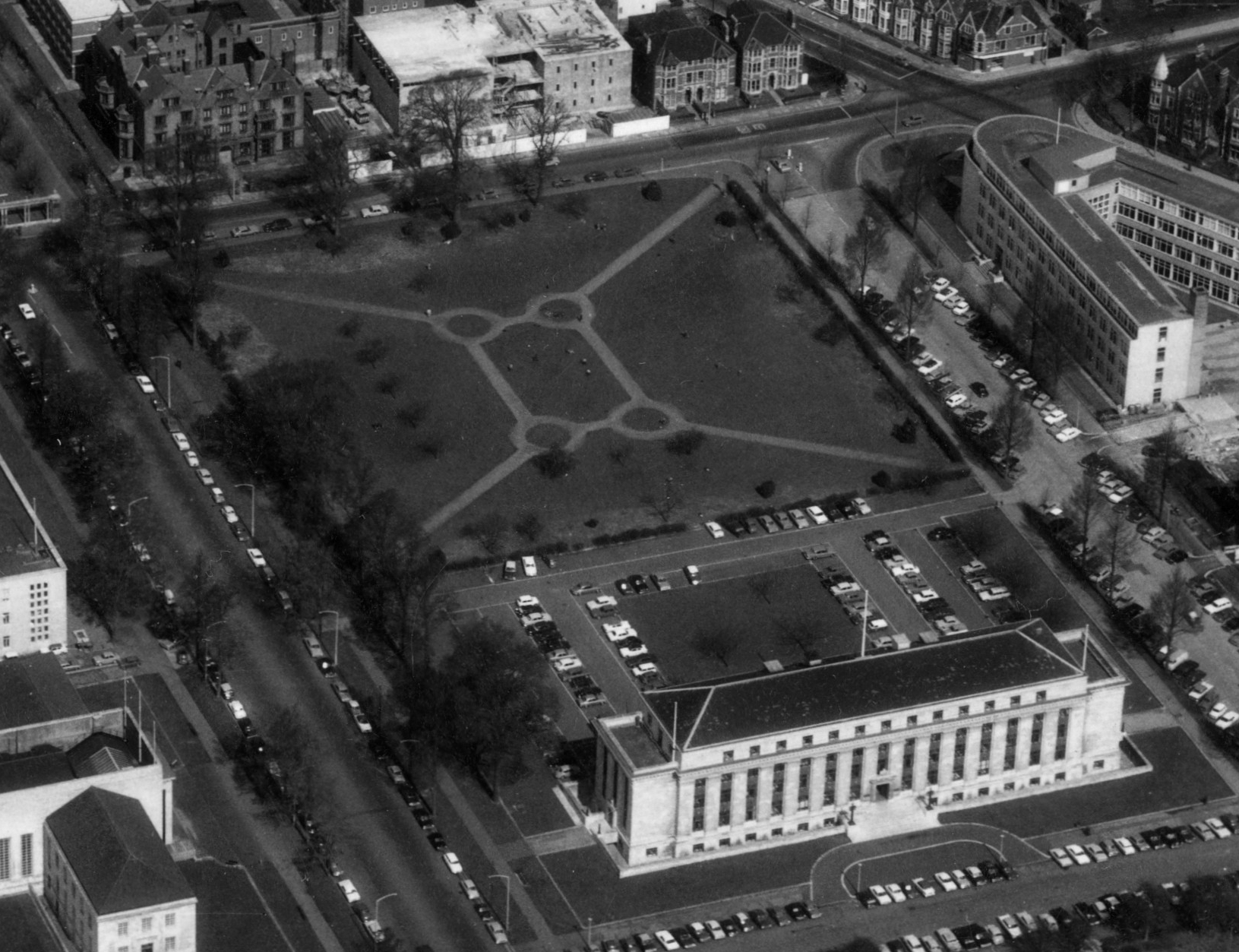
Cathays Park 1 (bottom) and Crown Gardens (top) in 1969, prior to the construction of Cathays Park 2

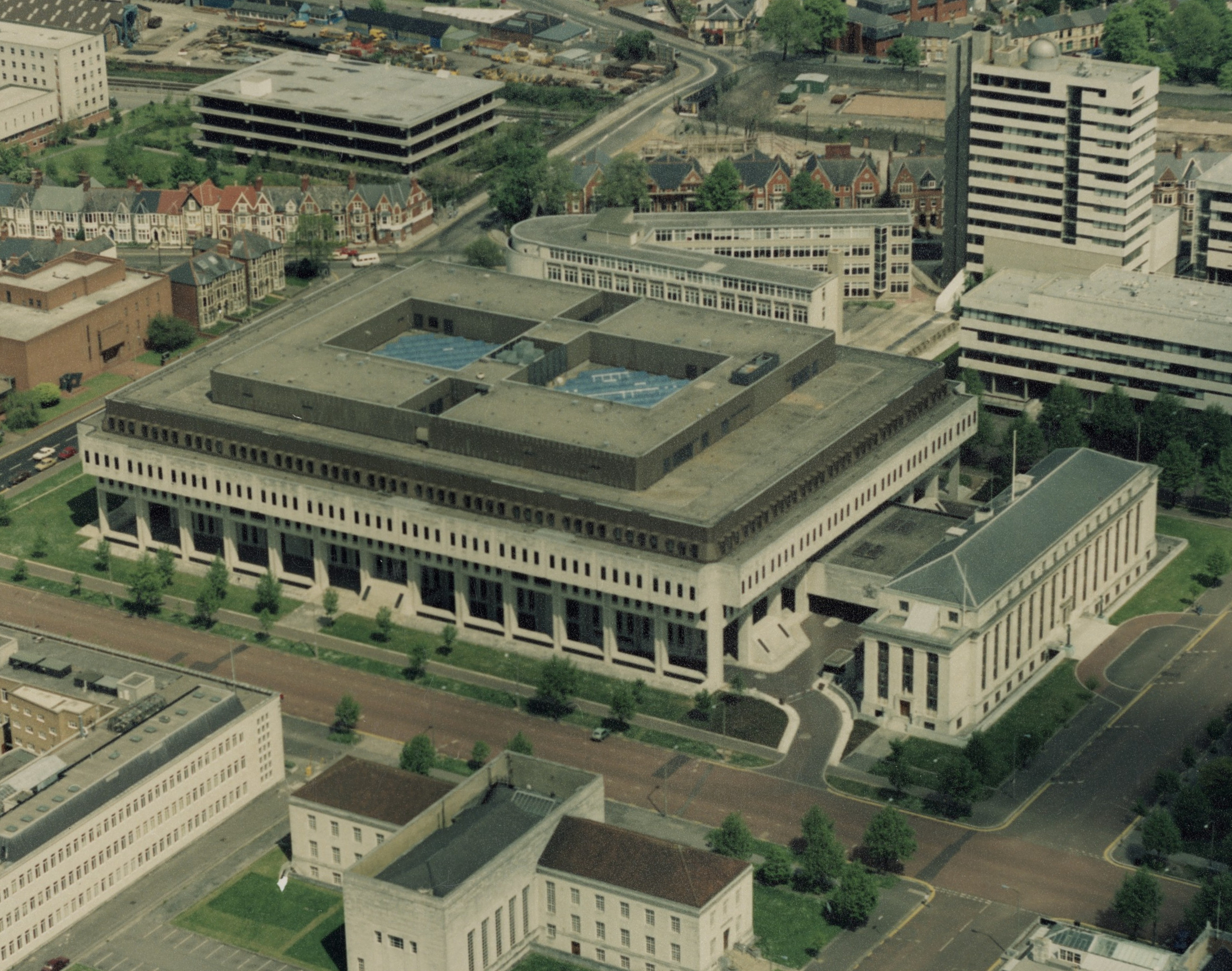
Cathays Park 2 (left) and Cathays Park 1 (right) in the late 1970s

The Crown Buildings (Welsh: Adeiladau y Goron), which are also known as the Cathays Park Buildings, are the Welsh Government's main offices in Cardiff, Wales. The buildings were formerly used by the Welsh Office and are situated in Cathays Park. The complex consists of two buildings, Cathays Park 1 (a Grade II-listed building) and Cathays Park 2, joined by a sky bridge.

== Cathays Park 1 ==
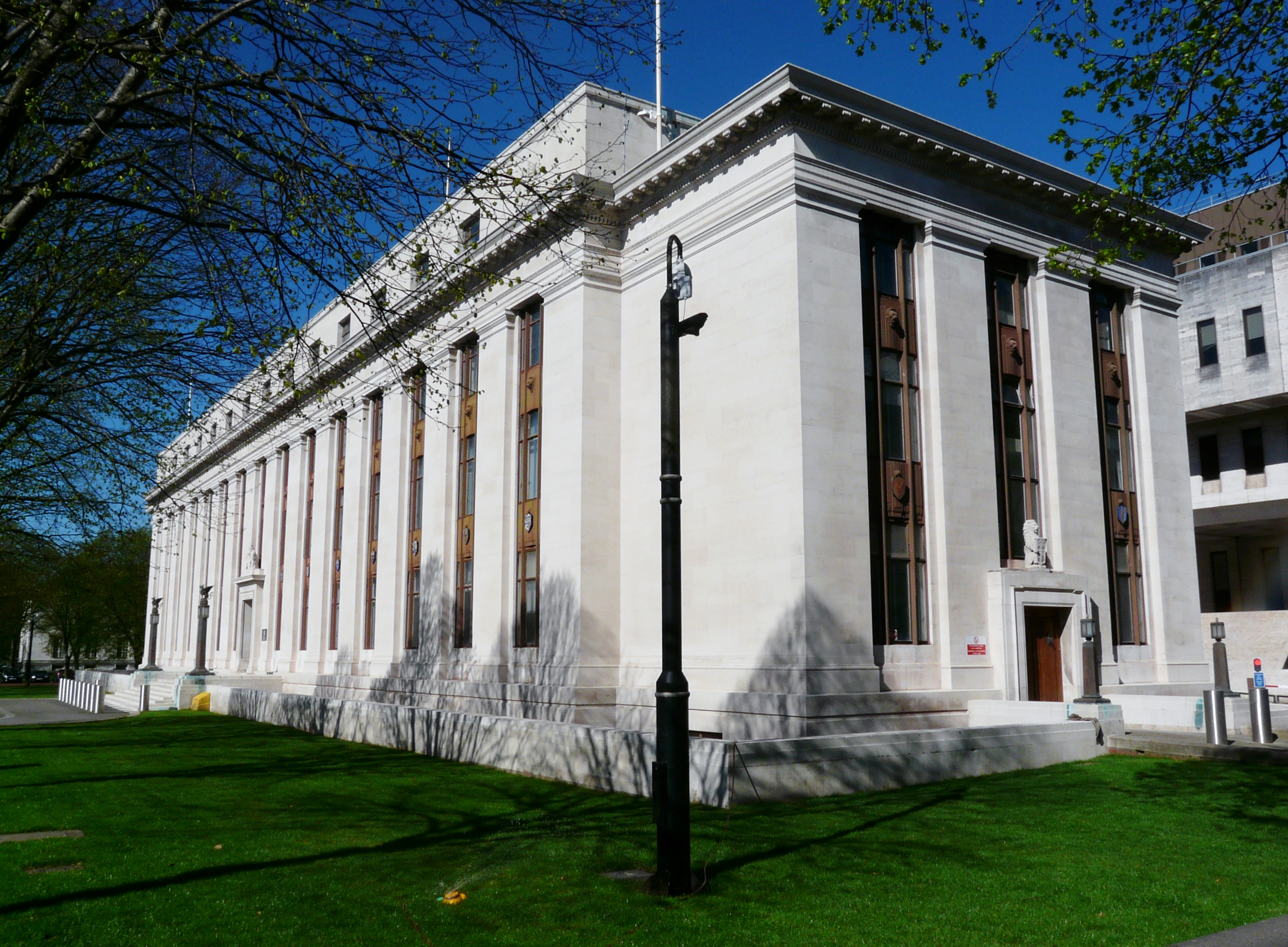
Cathays Park 1 (the old Crown Building)

In 1914 foundations were laid for an imposing neoclassical building on this site housing Welsh Government Offices, to a design by R. J. Allison, architect to the Office of Works. Work soon stopped and did not resume for 20 years. In 1934–1938, the block now known as Cathays Park 1 (a.k.a. CP1 or old Crown Building) was built by P. E. Hanton, as offices for the Welsh Board of Health. It is a three-storey building in the Stripped Classical style, with 3,599 m^{2} (38,740 sq ft) of floorspace. It also has an attic and a basement.

In 1968, Cathays Park 1 was damaged by a bomb explosion, the second in the area in under 12 months following a previous attack on the nearby Temple of Peace.

== Cathays Park 2 ==
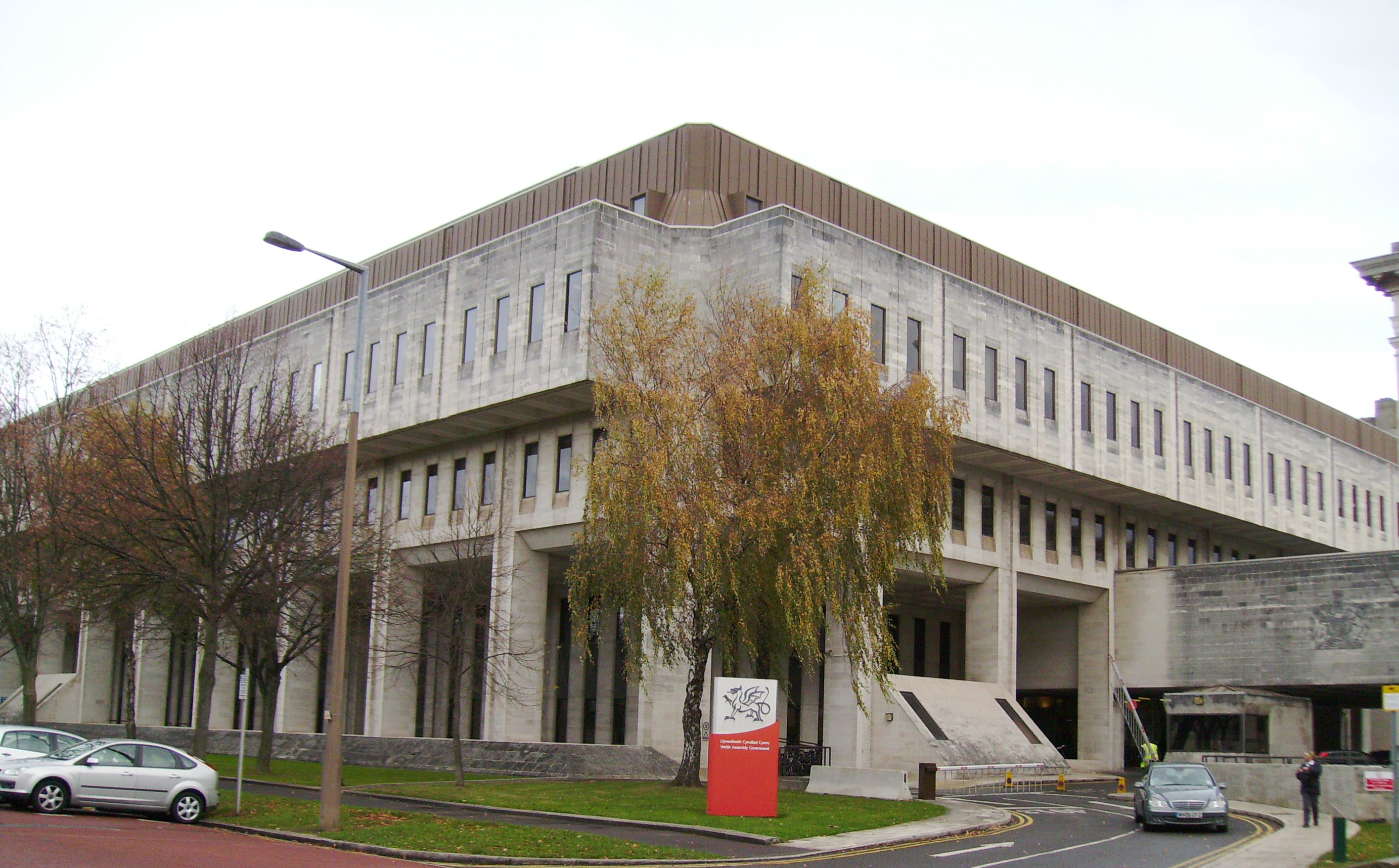
Cathays Park 2 (the new Crown Building) with the sky bridge to the right

Cathays Park 2 (a.k.a. CP2 or new Crown Building or Crown Buildings Phase II) is a five-storey office building with 34,305 m^{2} (369,260 sq ft) of floorspace, including an underground car park and a central atrium housing a cafe for the office staff. The architect was Alex Gordon & Partners. It was built on the site of the former Crown Gardens. The Encyclopaedia of Wales describes CP2, which was built from 1972 and completed in 1979, as conveying an impression of "bureaucracy under siege". The historian John Davies, however, regarded the complex as being "splendid".

== The sky bridge ==
The sky bridge between Cathays Park 1 and 2 'the link' has been the subject of some discussion amongst staff based in the building. People have reported an eerie feeling, a general sense of something "unworldly" with people catching fleeting glimpses out of the corner of their eye which had led to rumours of the area being haunted.

== See also ==
- List of Brutalist structures
