= Roy Campbell-Moore =

Scottish artist, dancer, and choreographer

Roy Campbell-Moore is a Scottish artist, dancer, and choreographer. He is best known for his contributions to arts in Wales and for co-founding the National Dance Company Wales in 1983 with his spouse, Ann Sholem. In 2013, the couple were presented with a lifetime achievement award at the Theatre Critics of Wales Awards for their contribution to the arts scene in that country. He now holds the position of Founding Director and Associate Artist at National Dance Company Wales.

Campbell-Moore continues to direct new dance and opera. He is also a dance photographer, showing his work internationally.

== Background ==
Roy Campbell-Moore was born in Scotland in 1951 and studied in Australia as a radio technician with the Department of Civil Aviation. He began dance training in Brisbane when he was twenty, then enrolled at the Rambert Ballet School in London before performing with Scottish Ballet from 1975 until 1981. While there, he worked with dance artists such as Rudolph Nureyev, Murray Louis, and Peter Darrell, who inspired him to become a choreographer. At the age of thirty, he trained in Cunningham, Limón, and Nikolais techniques, and in 1983, he founded Diversions, the Welsh Repertory Dance Company. He served as artistic director until 2007, when he took on the new post of artistic associate. His major achievements include creating over 25 works for the company and touring them nationally and internationally. Starting in 1997, he developed the concept of an international-quality home for the company at Wales Millennium Centre, which opened in 2004.
