= Jonathan Adams (architect) =

Welsh architect

Jonathan Adams RIBA FLSW
- Born: 1961 (age 64–65); Bristol, England
- Education: Welsh School of Architecture
- Occupation: Architect
- Spouse: Hazel Adams
- Children: 2
- Practice: Alsop & Lyall; Percy Thomas Architects; Capita Percy Thomas; Jonathan Adams and Partners Architects Ltd
- Projects: Wales Millennium Centre

Jonathan Gwyn AdamsRIBA FLSW Bristol, England, July 1961) is a Welsh architect particularly known for his landmark buildings in Cardiff.

== Biography ==
Notable projects

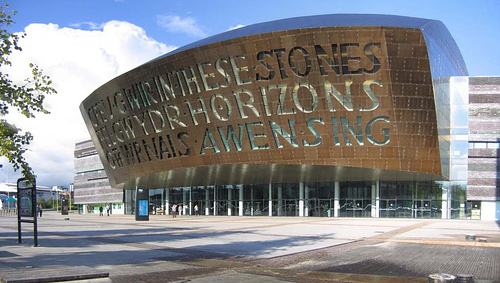
Wales Millennium Centre, Cardiff

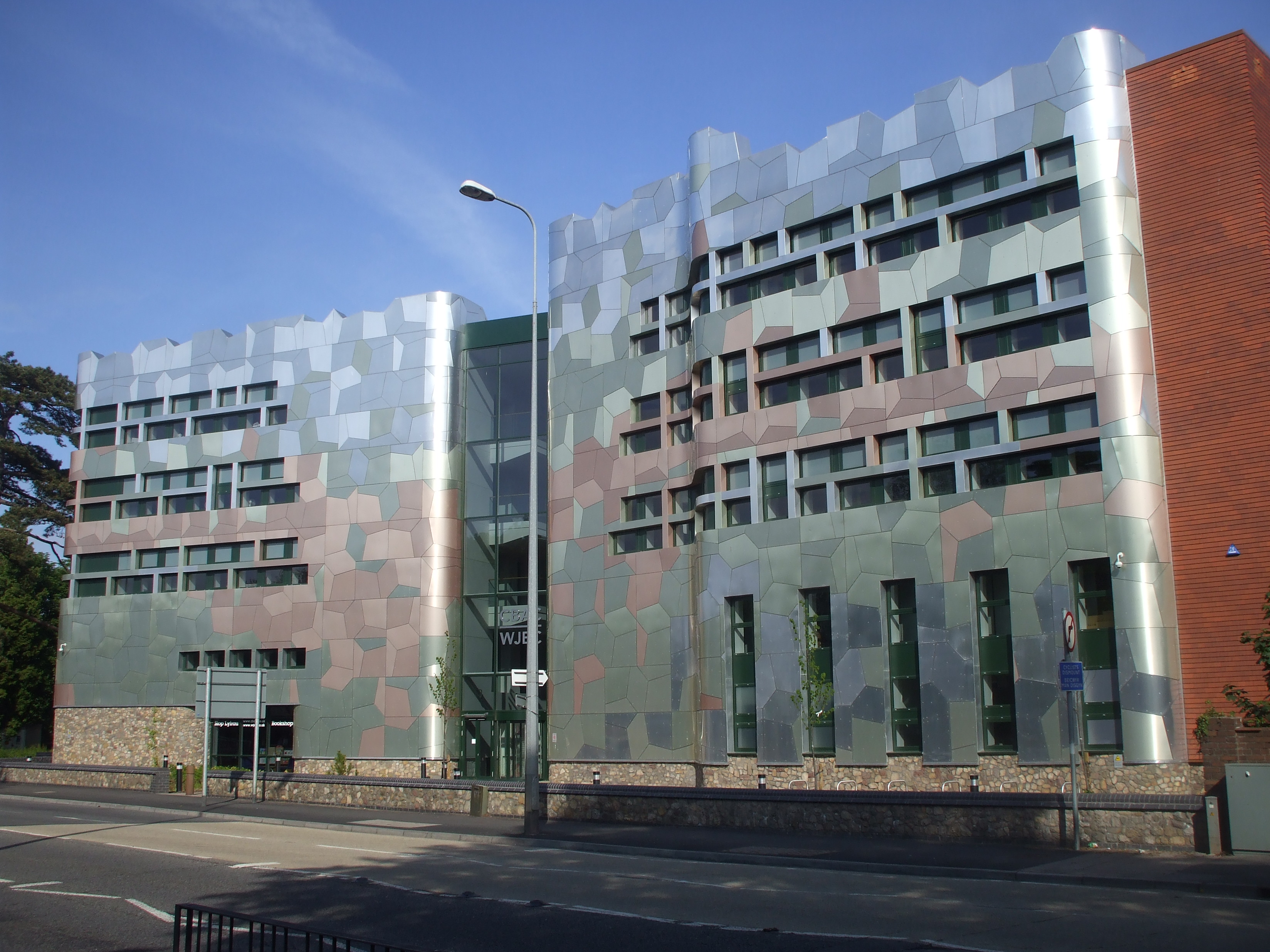
WJEC building, Cardiff

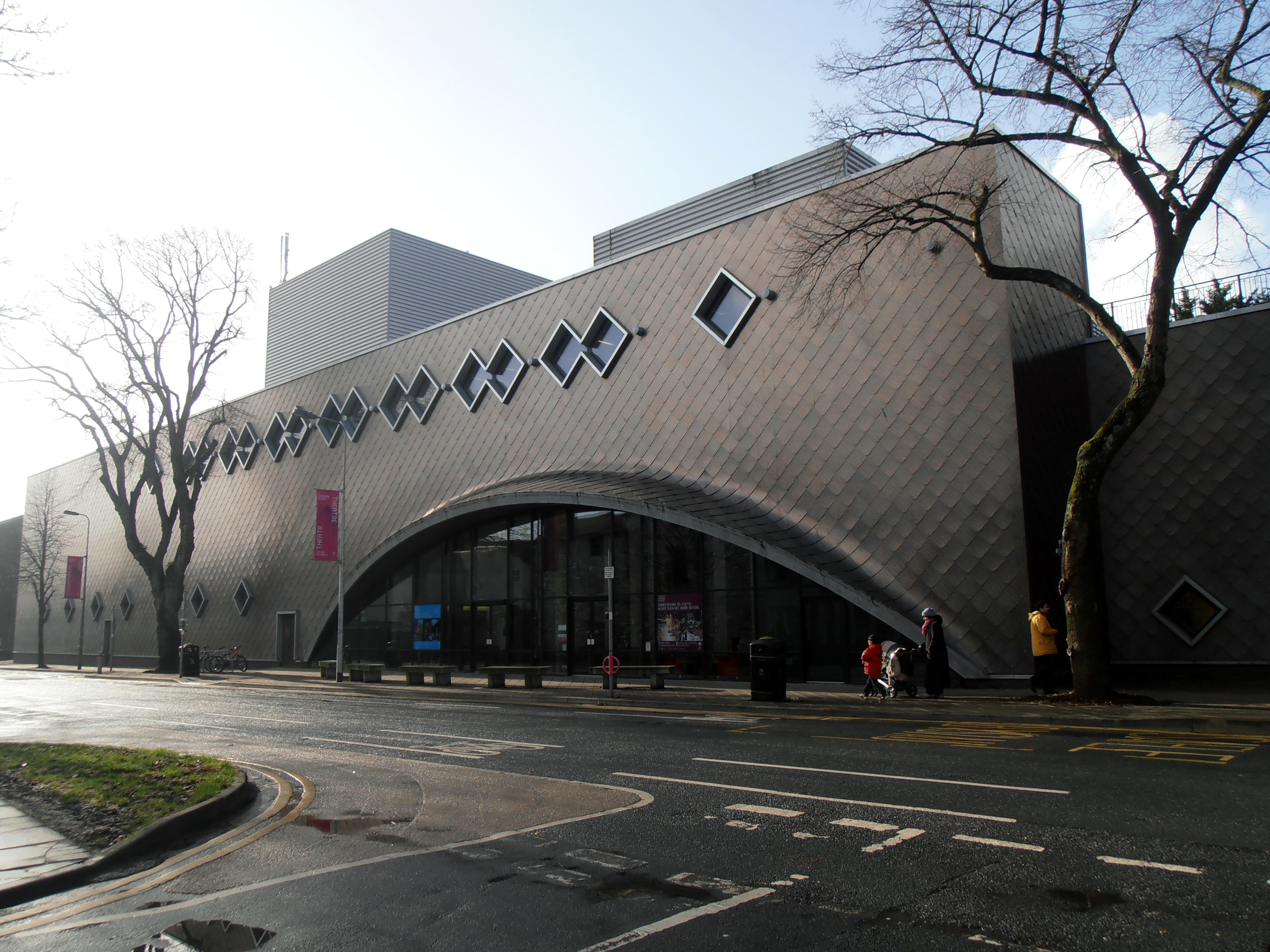
Sherman Theatre, Cardiff

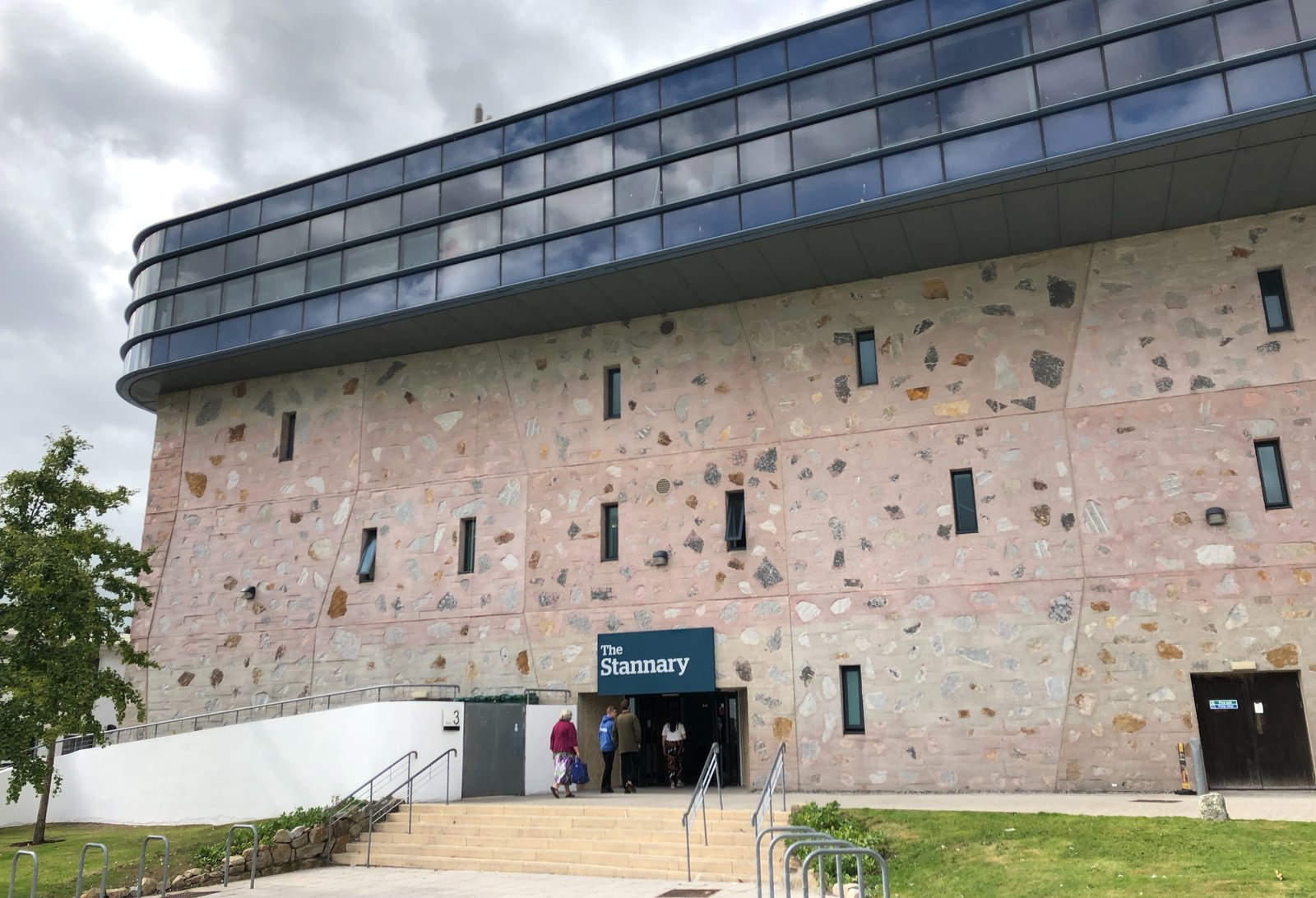
The Stannary, Penryn Campus, Falmouth University

Adams was born in Bristol, England. His parents are both teachers from coal mining families in the South Wales Valleys and the family moved to Lodge Hill in Caerleon in the mid-60s. He was later educated at the Welsh School of Architecture in Cardiff and he first started working for the former Greater London Council before getting a place at the Architectural Association in London. After graduating, he spent 15 years working in the practice of Will Alsop in London, where he worked on the North Greenwich tube station, next to the Millennium Dome. He returned to Wales in 1998. He later claimed he returned to Wales because London was "very inward-looking and self-regarding", while Wales was facing the "exciting time" of devolution during the late 1990s.

Adams joined Percy Thomas Architects and began work on the £106 million Wales Millennium Centre project in Cardiff Bay, which opened in November 2004 and for which he is best known. Adams says the design was inspired by the architect of Cardiff Castle, William Burges and the layered cliffs of the South Wales coast. The building was designed to create a modern Welsh identity, using North Wales slate and Welsh timber cladding.

In June 2004 Percy Thomas Architects were taken over by outsourcing company Capita. Adams agreed to remain with the company, though many of his colleagues left.

Adams was President of the Royal Society of Architects in Wales (RSAW) from 2005 to 2007. During his tenure, he expressed concern that the public often didn't understand good architecture.

In 2005 he began work on a major refurbishment and reorganisation of Cardiff's Sherman Theatre. The building re-opened in February 2012. Its facade used a distinctive metal cladding and the new entrance was relocated under a dramatic "eyelid".

In February 2010 Adams' new headquarters building for the Welsh Joint Education Committee (WJEC) was opened. It received criticism from the Wales branch of the Victorian Society, which likened it to an "upturned sandcastle". Adams had designed it to be contemporary, clad in steel and eye-catching from the main road.

On 17 September 2013 Adams established Jonathan Adams and Partners Architects Limited along with his wife Hazel Robb Adams. He presented a BBC television documentary about the American architect Frank Lloyd Wright, which was broadcast at the end of August 2017 on BBC Four and BBC Two Wales. In September 2022 Adams rejoined Percy Thomas Architects as Senior Architect.

== Bibliography ==
- Frank Lloyd Wright: The Architecture of Defiance ISBN 978-1786839145
- Columns (Detail in Building) ISBN 978-0471978077
