= Hijinx Theatre =

Theatre company in Cardiff, Wales

Hijinx
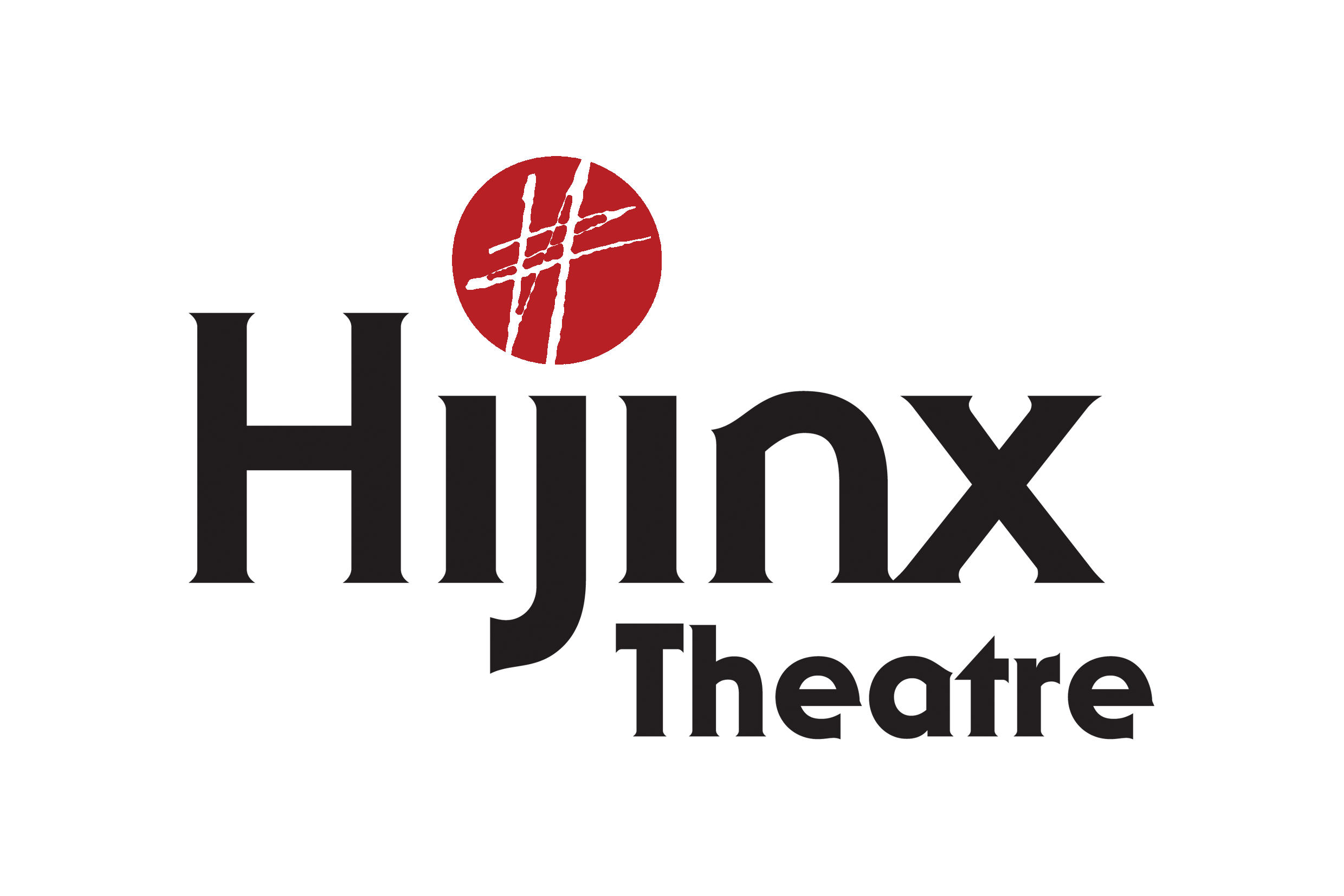
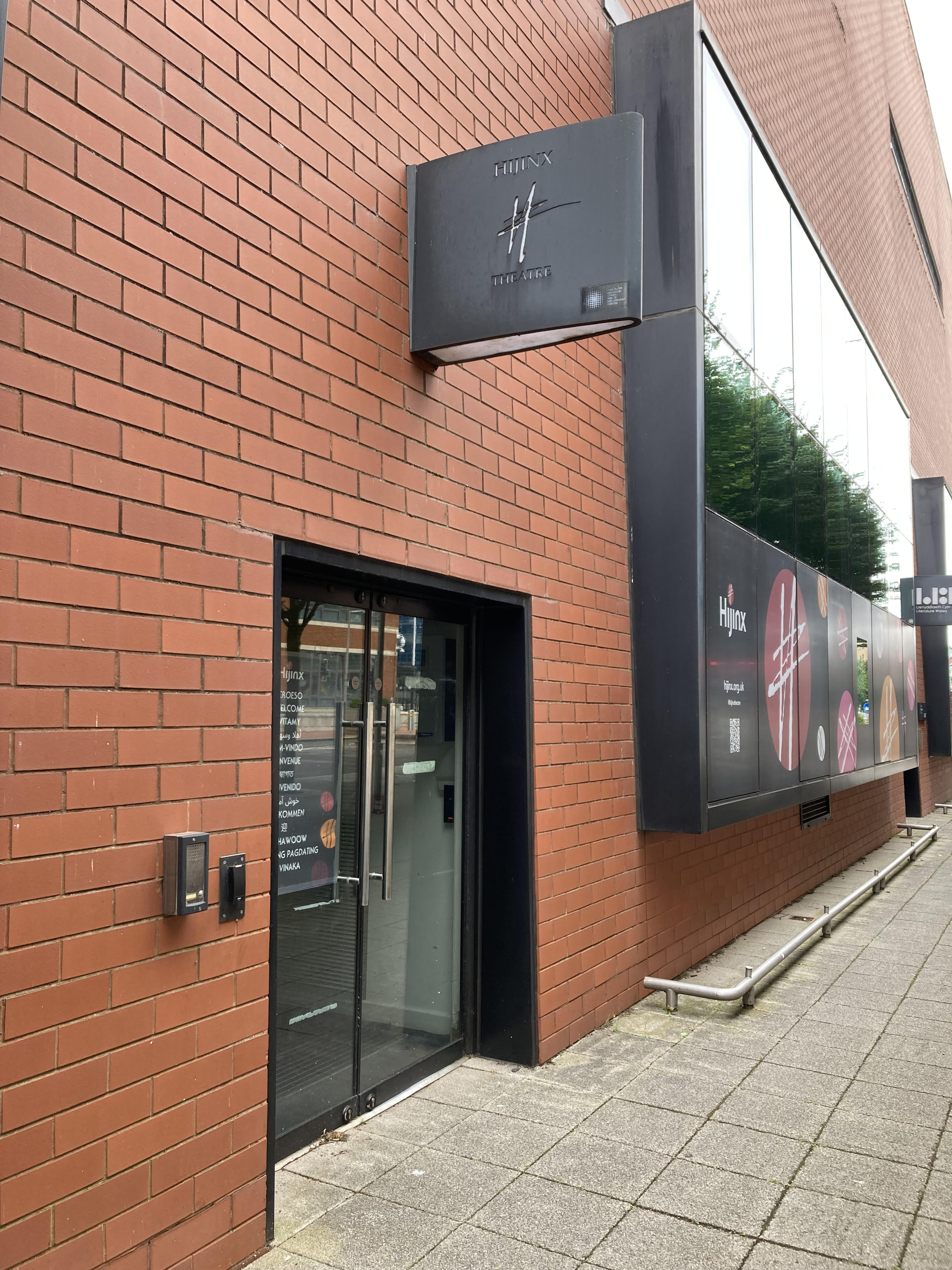
- Entrance to Hijinx
- Formation: 1981
- Type: Theatre group
- Location: Cardiff, Wales
- Artistic director: Ben Pettitt-Wade
- Website: hijinx.org.uk

Hijinx is one of Europe’s leading inclusive theatre companies, based at the Wales Millennium Centre in Cardiff, Wales. Hijinx creates exhilarating, subversive theatre from large to small scale for both indoor and outdoor performance.

Artists with learning disabilities and/or autism are involved every step of the way in the making and performing of their stories.

== History ==
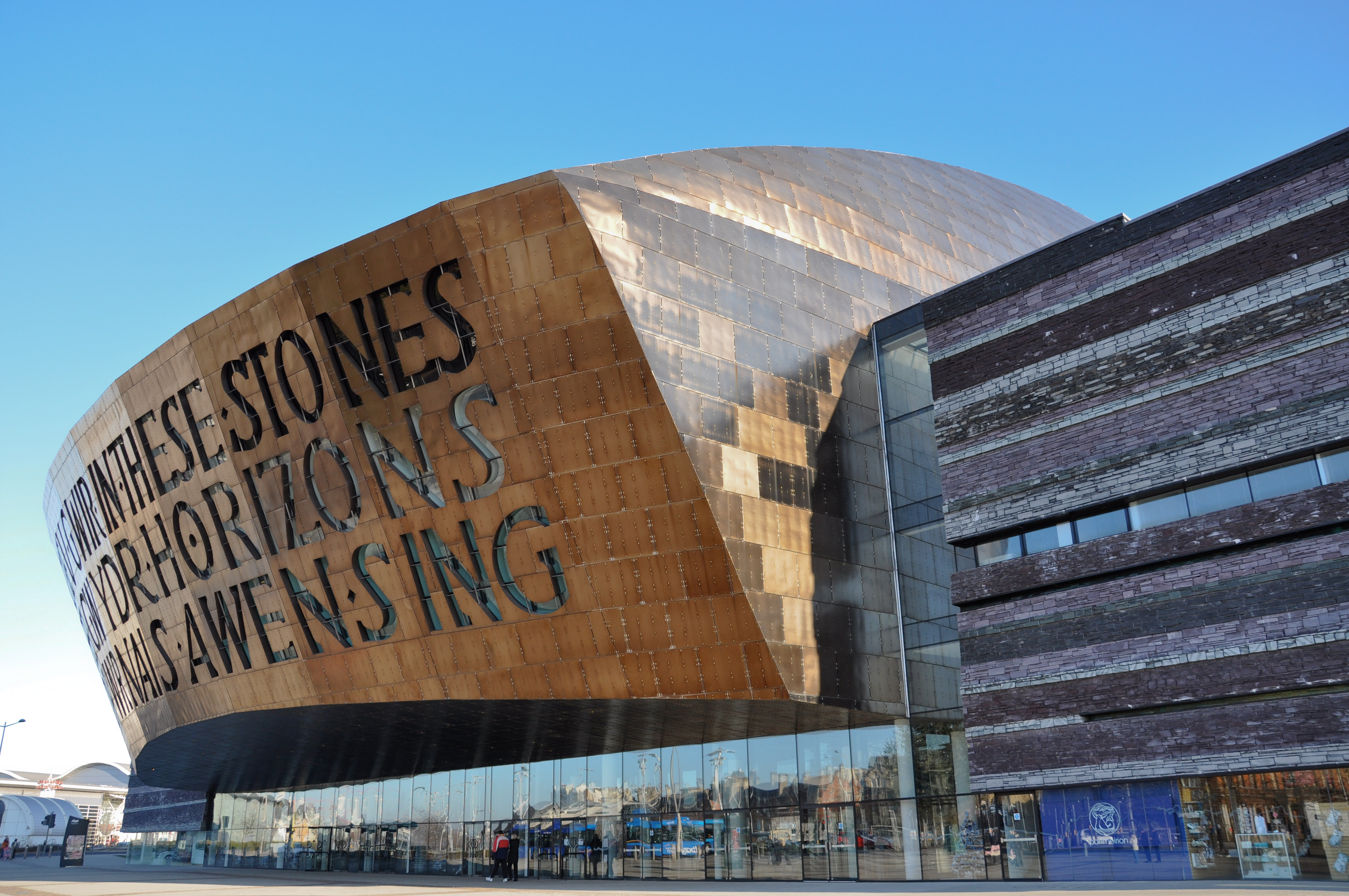
Wales Millennium Centre

Hijinx was founded in 1981 by Gaynor Lougher and Richard Berry after they were asked to create a performance for Ely Festival in Cardiff. They enjoyed the experience so much they began to tour small scale productions throughout Wales with the set and costumes stuffed into the back of an old estate car. The company they created together took theatre to people’s doorsteps in places that do not have access to the glitzy arts centres and grand theatres of our towns and cities. At the company’s heart there has always been a commitment and belief that theatre is for everyone.

After touring as a performer with Hijinx for 11 years, Gaynor became the Artistic Director in 1994, taking the lead on shows for the learning disabled community as well as running numerous projects and workshops and setting up Hijinx Odyssey in 1999, a community drama group for adults of all abilities which is still going strong.

In 2004, Hijinx moved into the Wales Millennium Centre in Cardiff and in 2006 started to create shows that cast actors with learning disabilities in a professional capacity alongside actors without disabilities.

In 2008, Hijinx founded Unity Festival as a platform for the highest quality inclusive and disability arts from around the world.

The first Hijinx Academy was introduced in 2012 to support their commitment that all Hijinx professional touring shows would now include artists with learning disability and/or autism.

In 2014, Gaynor and Richard were presented with the Special Recognition Award at the Theatre Critics of Wales Awards as the founder members of Hijinx.

After 30 years of dedicated service to Hijinx, Gaynor stepped down from her role in 2015 to pursue a freelance career as director, actor and workshop facilitator. Ben Pettitt-Wade became Artistic Director in the same year, having been with the company in other capacities since 2007.

Originally founded as a co-operative, Hijinx is now a not-for-profit company, limited by guarantee, and a registered charity.

== Hijinx Academies ==
Hijinx has established five Hijinx Academies, they are the only professional performance training for actors with learning disabilities in Wales. The first Hijinx Academy was established in Cardiff in 2012.

There are now two Academies in Cardiff (Hijinx Academy South 1 & 2) based at Chapter Arts Centre, one in Mold (Hijinx Academy North) based at Theatr Clwyd, one in Carmarthen (Hijinx Academy West) based at the Lyric Theatre, and one in Aberystwyth (Hijinx Academy Mid) based at Aberystwyth Arts Centre.

== Recent Productions ==
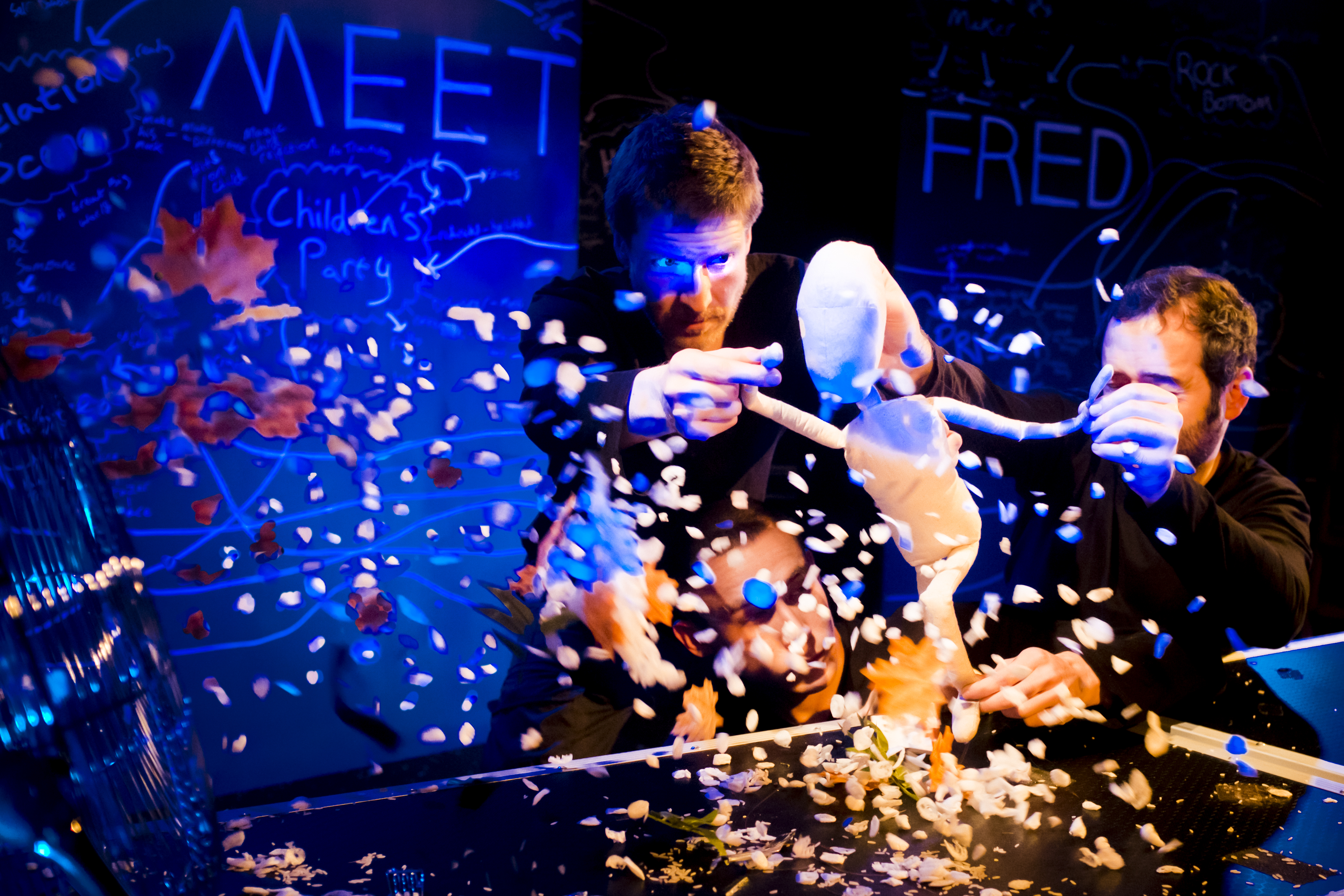
A scene from Meet Fred (2016)

Year	Title	Director	Notes
2024	Meta vs Life	Ben Pettitt-Wade & Matthew Blake	
2023	Housemates	Ben Pettitt-Wade & Joe Murphy	in association with Sherman Theatre
2023	Bon Appetit	Ben Pettitt-Wade	in association with l'Oiseau Mouche
2022	the_crash.test	Ben Pettitt-Wade	
2020	Metamorphosis	Ben Pettitt-Wade	
2019	Into The Light	Scott Graham & Krista Vuori	in association with Frantic Assembly
2019	Mission Control	Ben Pettitt-Wade & Kully Thiarai	co-produced by National Theatre Wales
2018	The Flop	Ben Pettitt-Wade	in association with Spymonkey
2016	Meet Fred	Ben Pettitt-Wade	in association with Blind Summit
