= National Dance Company Wales =

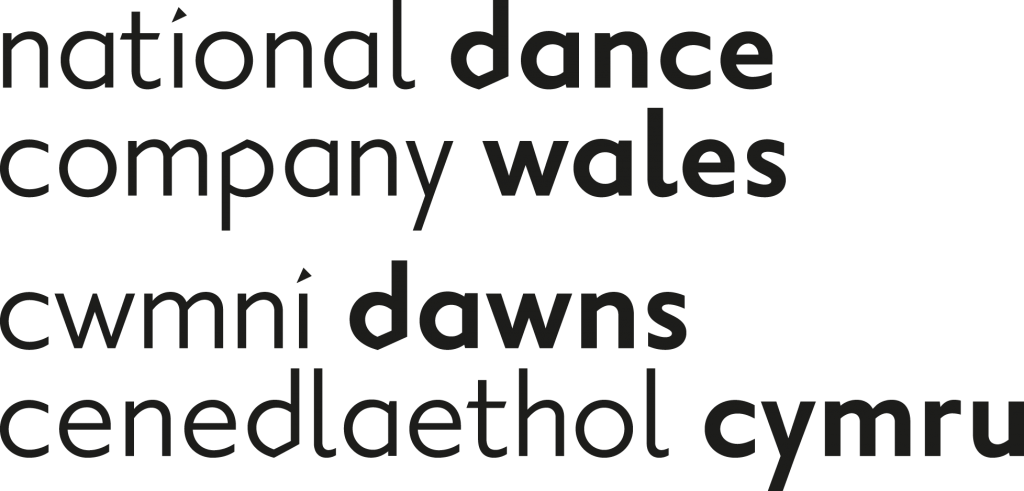
- Abbreviation: NDCWales
- Formation: 1983
- Founders: Roy Campbell-Moore; Ann Sholem
- Purpose: Dance company
- Region served: UK and internationally
- Artistic Director: Bakani Pick-Up
- Website: ndcwales.co.uk

National Dance Company Wales (NDCWales), originally Diversions, the Dance Company of Wales, is the national dance company of Wales. It was established in 1983 by Roy Campbell-Moore and Ann Sholem and is funded by the Arts Council of Wales. It was renamed in 2009. Bakani Pick-Up was appointed Artistic Director in 2025.

National Dance Company Wales is a resident company at the Wales Millennium Centre and is a contemporary dance company which performs work from established international choreographers and tours throughout the UK and abroad. Programmes of dance are presented within the format of double and triple bills.

The company also runs a wide range of participation, professional development and "engagement opportunities" for people of all ages. This includes open classes and rehearsals, dance courses, the Young Associates programme, Dance for Parkinson's and support for Wales-based choreographers.

== Dance House ==
The Dance House

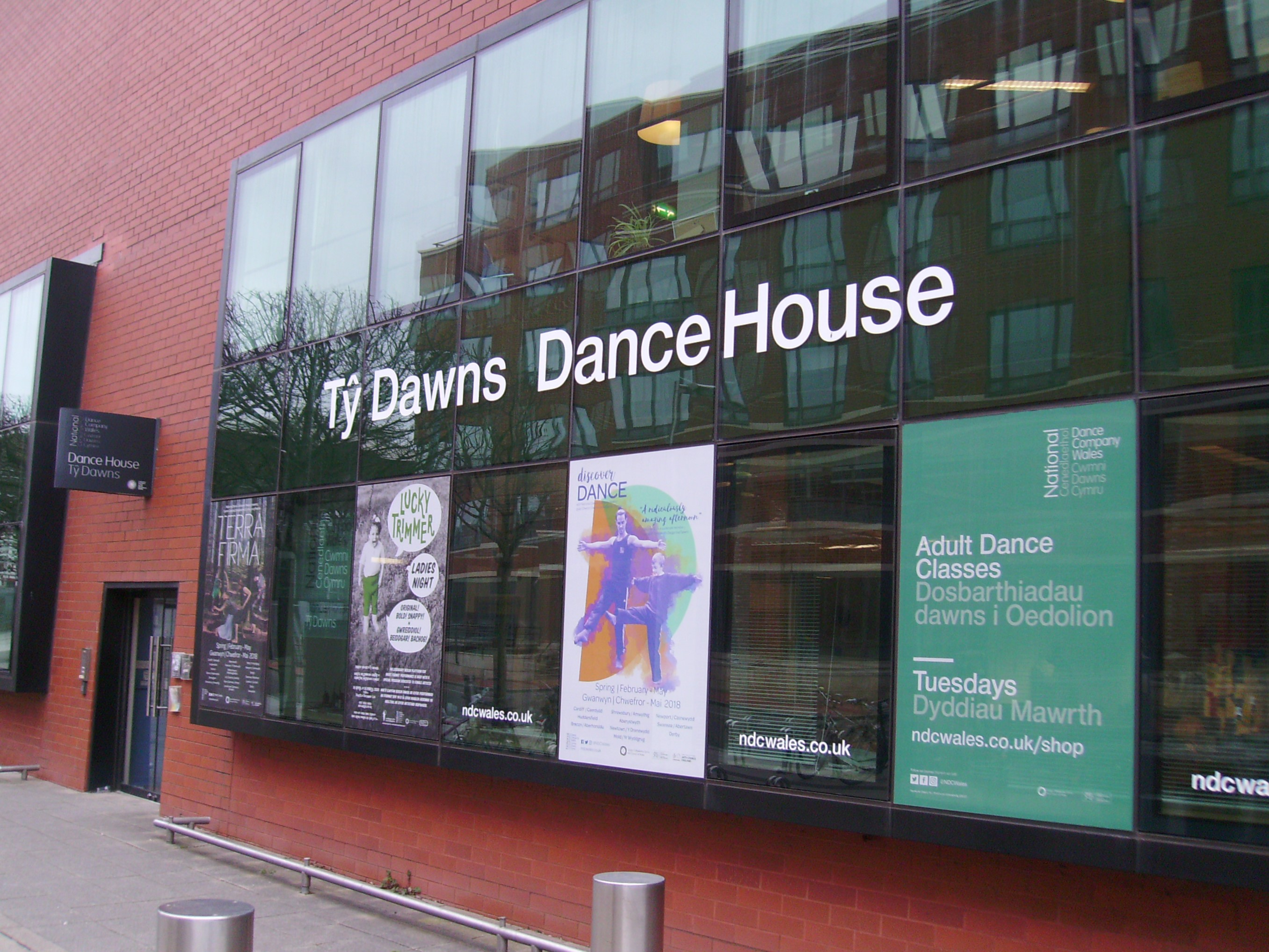
Entrance to the Dance House

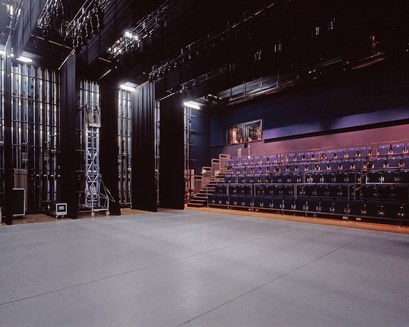
The Blue Room studio

The Dance House is the home of the National Dance Company Wales in the Wales Millennium Centre. It houses two production studios, office space and a lounge area. The main production studio, the Blue Room, includes 100 tiered and retractable seats. The second studio, the Man Gwyn, provides additional rehearsal space and is fitted with ballet barres and mirrors. The Dance House is a production facility and performance space for both NDCWales productions and other dance projects.

== Repertoire ==
Current

The autumn 2025 show Surge consists of three works. The piece Mabon, named for the mythological figure Mabon ap Modron, is based on ancient Welsh stories from the Mabinogion.

- Infinity Duet Choreographer: Faye Tan and Visual Artist Cecile Johnson Soliz
- Waltz Choreographer: Marcos Morau (Spain)
- Mabon Choreographer: Osian Meilir (UK)

Previous touring works include

- SEPTEMBER Choreographer: Matthew William Robinson (UK)
- Skinners Choreographer: Melanie Lane (Australia)
- Waltz Choreographer: Marcos Morau (Spain)
- SAY SOMETHING Choreographer: SAY – Sarah Golding and Yukiko Masui (UK)
- NO SHOW Choreographer: Matthew Robinson (UK)
- Fan the Flames Choreographer: Thomas Carsley (UK)
- 2067, Time and Time and Time Choreographer: Alexandra Waierstall (Germany)
- Moving Is Everywhere, Forever Choreographer: Faye Tan (UK)
- Rygbi Choreographer: Fearghus ó Conchúir (Ireland)
- Why Are People Clapping Choreographer: Ed Myhill (UK)
- Wild Thoughts Choreographer: Mario Bermudez Gil (Israel)
- Afterimage Choreographer: Fernando Melo (Brazil)
- Codi Choreographer: Anthony Matsena (UK)
- Ludo Choreographer: Caroline Finn (Germany)
- Revellers' Mass Choreographer: Caroline Finn (Germany)
- Atalaÿ Choreographer: Mario Bermudez Gil (Spain)
- Tundra Choreographer: Marcos Morau (Spain)
- Folk Choreographer: Caroline Finn (UK)
- Animatorium Choreographer: Caroline Finn (UK)
- They Seek to Find the Happiness They Seem Choreographer: Lee Johnston (Australia / UK)
- Parade Choreographer: Caroline Finn (UK)
- Profundis Choreographer: Roy Assaf (Israel)
- The Green House Choreographer: Caroline Finn (UK)
- Walking Mad Choreographer: Johan Inger (Sweden)
- Tupet Choreographer: Alexander Ekman (Sweden)
- A Mighty Wind Choreographer: Jeroen Verbruggen (Belgium)
- Mythology Choreographer: Stephen Shropshire (Netherlands/USA)
- Water Stories Choreographer: Stephen Petronio (USA)
- Purlieus Choreographer: Lee Johnston (UK)
- Dream Choreographer: Christopher Bruce (UK)
- Noces Choreographer: Angelin Preljocaj (France)
- Virtual Descent Choreographer: Eleesha Drennan (Canada)
- B/olero & Black Milk Choreographer: Ohad Naharin (Israel)
- Phantoms of Us Choreographer: Eleesha Drennan (Canada)
- Quixoteland Choreographer: Gustavo Ramirez Sansano (Spain)
- By Singing Light Choreographer: Stephen Petronio (USA)
- Romance Inverse Choreographer: Itzik Galili (Israel)
