= Wales Millennium Centre =

Arts centre in Cardiff Bay, Wales

- The Armadillo
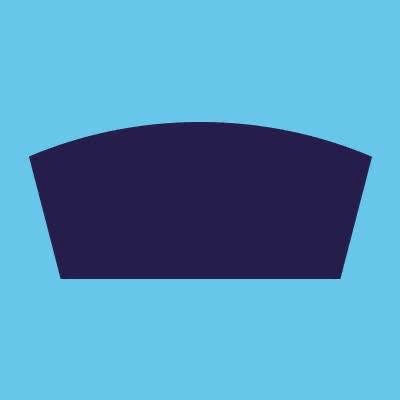

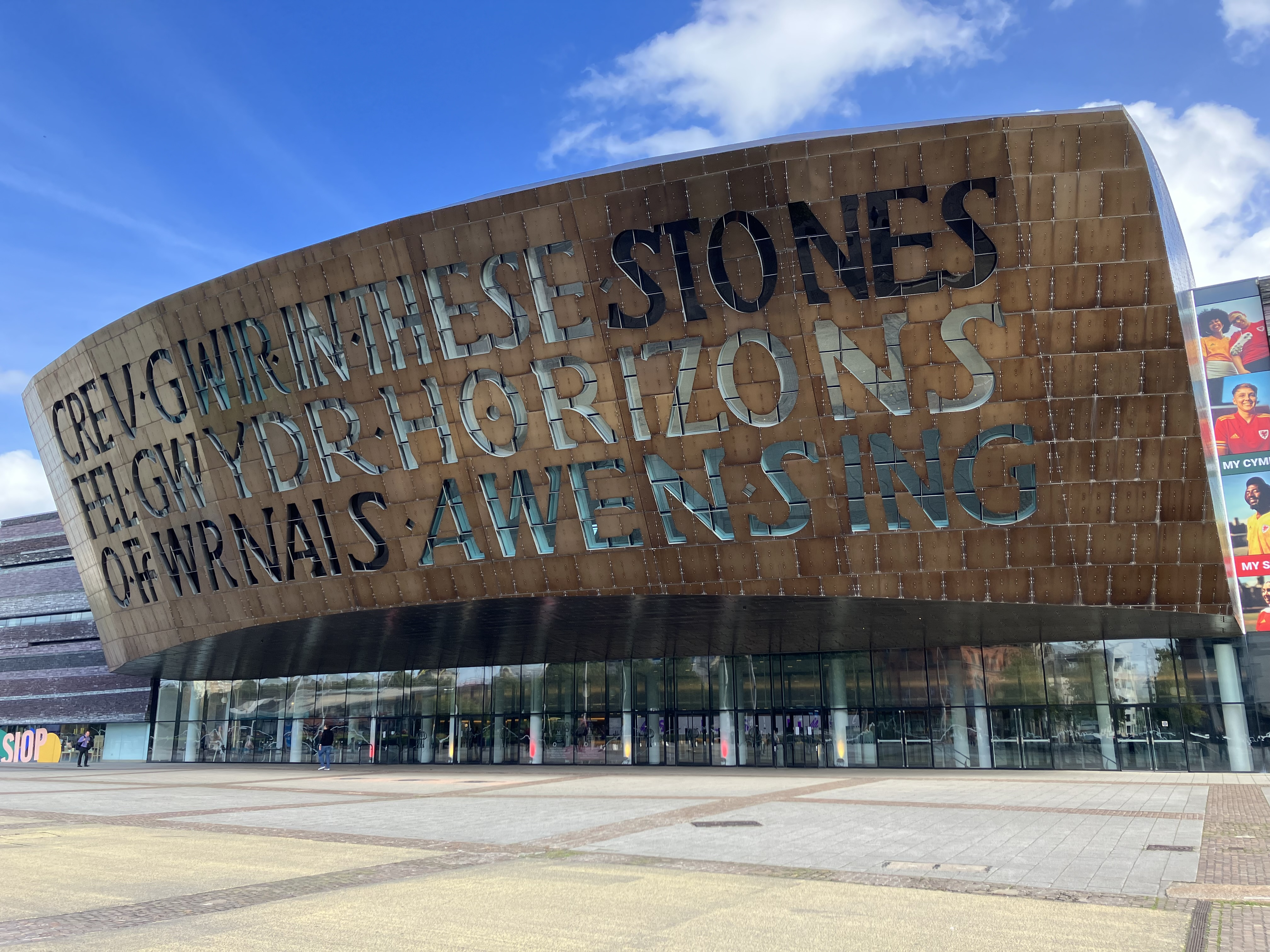
- Main entrance to the Wales Millennium Centre on Roald Dahl Plass
- Interactive map of Wales Millennium Centre
- Location: Bute Place, Cardiff Bay, Cardiff, Wales
- Coordinates: 51°27′54.14″N 3°9′48.72″W
- Owner: Phase 1: Wales Millennium Centre; Phase 2: Lime Property Fund (Aviva Investors)
- Operator: Phase 1: Wales Millennium Centre; Phase 2: BBC
- Capacity: Donald Gordon Theatre: 1,897; BBC Hoddinott Hall: 350; Weston Studio Theatre: 250; Cabaret: 140; Grace Williams Studio: 60
- Type: Company limited by guarantee

Construction
- Groundbreaking: February 2002
- Opened: Phase 1: 26–28 November 2004; Phase 2: 31 January 2009
- Renovated: 2022/3 (Phase 1 Refurbishment)
- Cost: Phase 1: £106.2 million Phase 2: £18 million Phase 1 Refurbishment: £4 million
- Architects: Phase 1: Jonathan Adams (Percy Thomas Partnership); Phase 2: Tim Green and Keith Vince (Capita Percy Thomas); Phase 1 Refurbishment: Richard H Powell (interior designers)
- Structural engineer: Arup Group
- Main contractor: Sir Robert McAlpine

Tenants
- Arts Council of Wales; Literature Wales; National Dance Company Wales; Hijinx Theatre; Two Rhythms; Tŷ Cerdd – Music Centre Wales; Urdd Gobaith Cymru; Welsh National Opera; BBC National Orchestra of Wales

Website
- www.wmc.org.uk
- Building details

Technical details
- Material: 4,500 tonnes of structural steel 2,000 tonnes of recycled Welsh slate (cladding)
- Floor count: 6
- Floor area: 37,000 m^{2} (400,000 sq ft)
- Lifts/elevators: 2

Other information
- Public transit: Cardiff Bay; Baycar; Cardiff Waterbus

Wales Millennium Centre (Welsh: Canolfan Mileniwm Cymru) is Wales's national arts centre located in the Cardiff Bay area of Cardiff, Wales. The site covers a total area of 7.5 acres (3.0 ha). Phase 1 of the building was opened during the weekend of 26–28 November 2004 and phase 2 opened on 22 January 2009 with an inaugural concert.

The centre is Cardiff's principal receiving venue for large-scale opera, ballet, contemporary dance and musicals. It comprises a large theatre and a smaller hall with a shop, bars and a café. It houses the BBC National Orchestra and Chorus of Wales and opera, dance, theatre and literature companies, with a total of eight arts organisations in residence.

In 2012 the Centre announced that it would also be a producing company. Its productions across the genres have been performed in London, Edinburgh and Australia. In 2021 and 2024 it was in co-production with the Royal National Theatre.

The main theatre, the Donald Gordon Theatre, has 1,896 seats, and claims to be the second-largest stage in Europe. The BBC Hoddinott Hall seats 350 and the Weston Studio Theatre seats 250.

In 2001 Lord Rowe-Beddoe was appointed chair of Wales Millennium Centre, a company limited by guarantee. Peter Swinburn is the current chair of Wales Millennium Centre.

== Background ==
=== The failed Cardiff Bay Opera House project ===
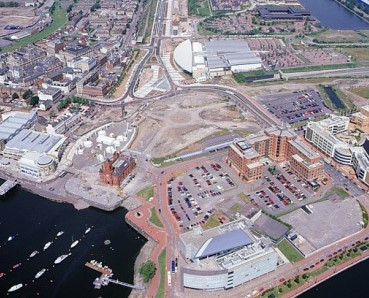
Site of the proposed Cardiff Bay Opera House and later Wales Millennium Centre in the open space in the middle of the image

Wales Millennium Centre replaced an earlier project for the site, the Cardiff Bay Opera House, a plan supported by the Cardiff Bay Development Corporation to construct a permanent home for the Welsh National Opera.

An international design competition attracted 268 international applicants, and was won by Iraq-born architect Zaha Hadid. Her avant-garde design was so radical that she and a selection of other applicants were asked to submit revised designs for a second round of competition—which she again won with "a sleek and dazzling complex of sharp lines and surfaces that she compared to an 'inverted necklace'".

In December 1995 the Millennium Commission, the body which distributed funds from the UK National Lottery, decided against lottery funding for the project. It was suggested that the bid failed because of "the unpopular Conservative government's fear of controversy", favouring the funding of projects perceived as more populist, such as the Millennium Stadium.

=== Origins of Wales Millennium Centre ===
After the Cardiff Bay Opera House project was rejected, a new project was conceived that included more than opera and was felt to be a better reflection of Welsh culture. The change of name symbolised this, but the project still had to overcome many hurdles. Funding from the Welsh Assembly and Millennium Commission took years to obtain. Cardiff Council had to buy the land after the previous owner, Grosvenor Waterside (the property division of Associated British Ports) threatened to build a retail centre there due to the delays. Further boosts were given by large donations from South African businessman Donald Gordon and a loan from the international bank, HSBC. The £20 million donation from Donald Gordon was split evenly between the Royal Opera House and Wales Millennium Centre and was spread over five years. This is believed to be the largest single private donation ever made to the arts in the UK.

== Phase 1 – Donald Gordon Theatre and Weston Studio Theatre ==
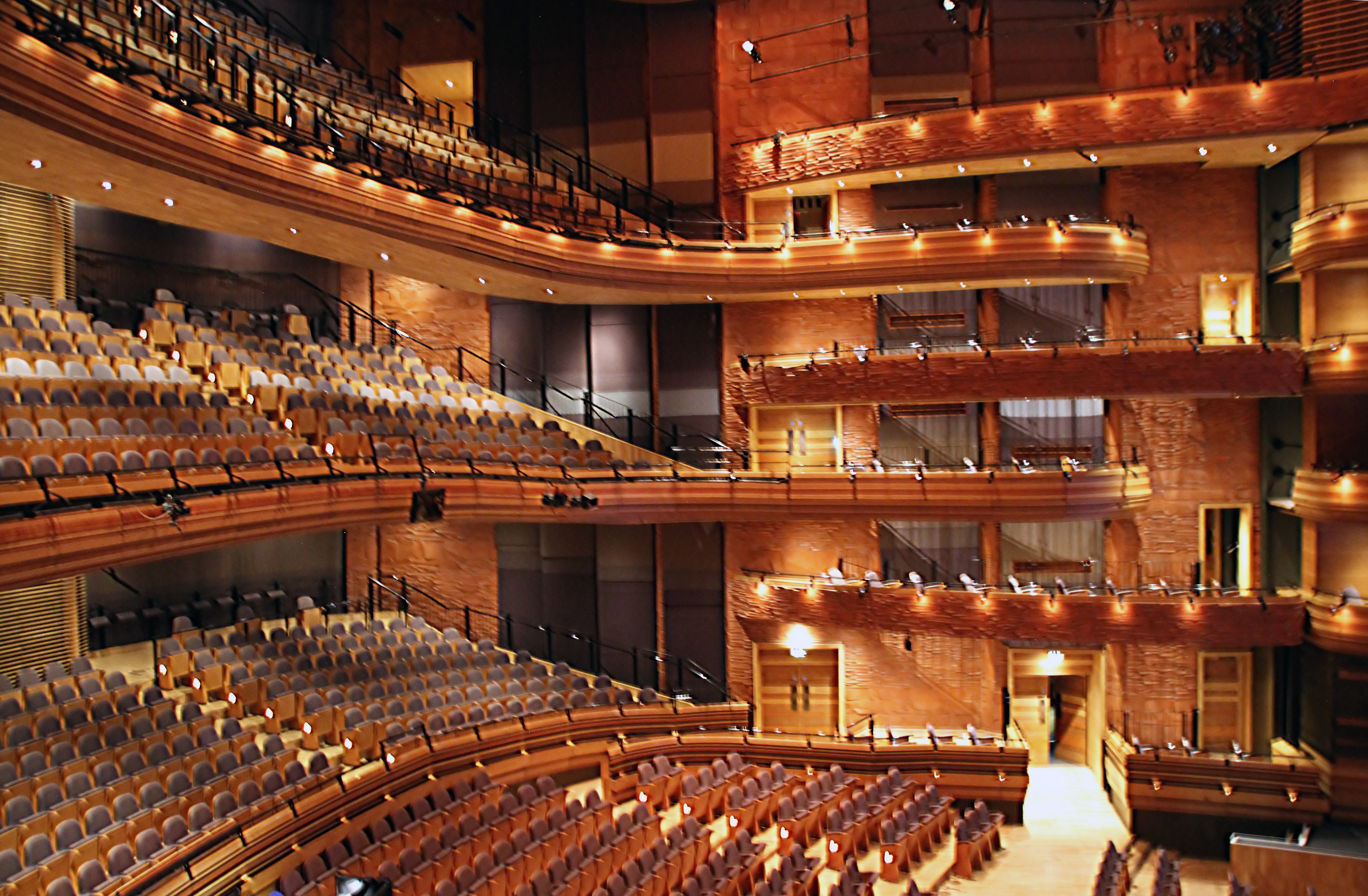
The Donald Gordon Theatre auditorium

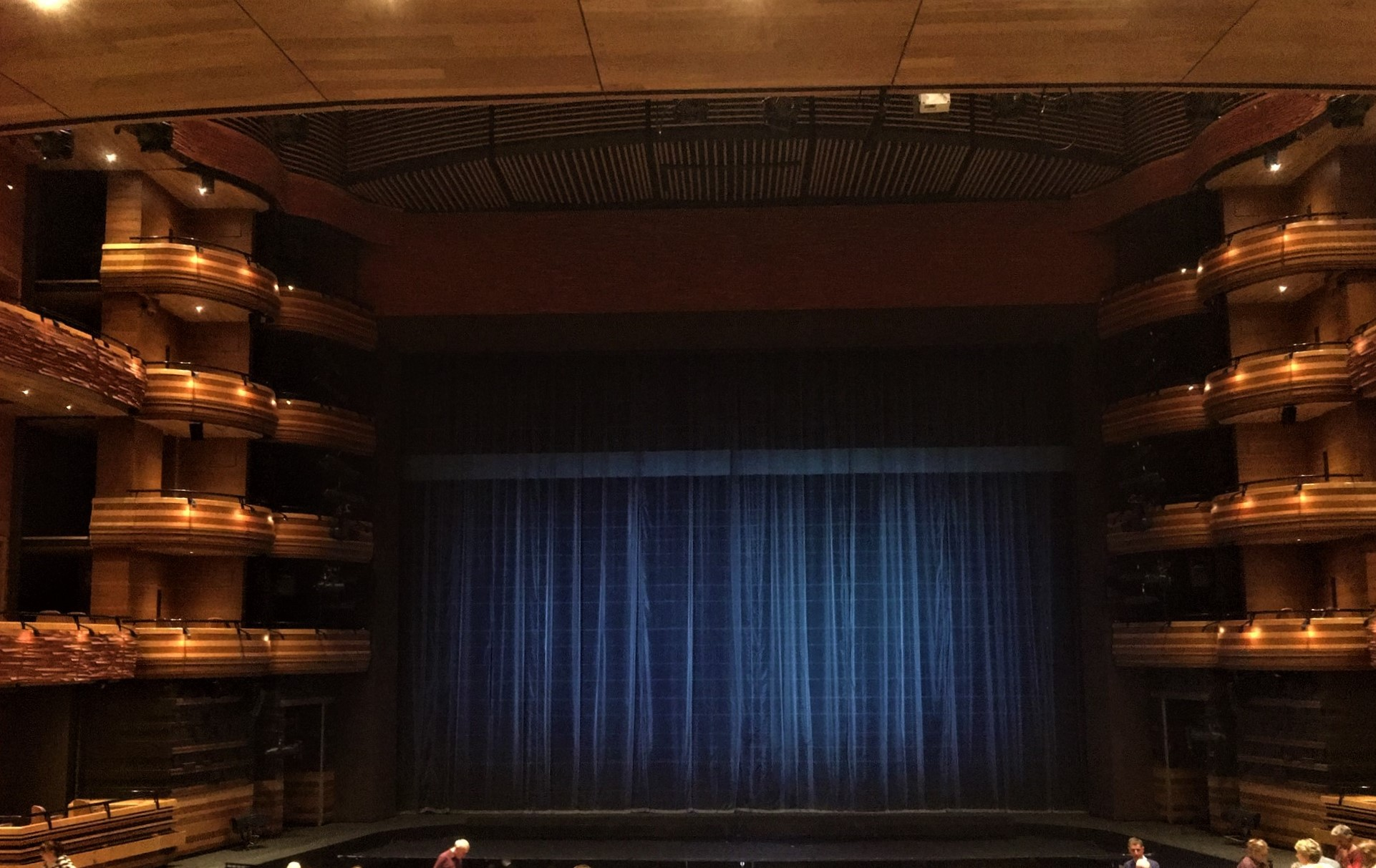
The Donald Gordon Theatre stage

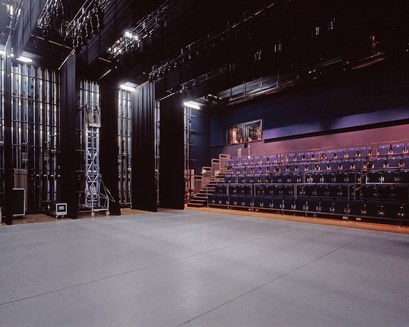
The Blue Room

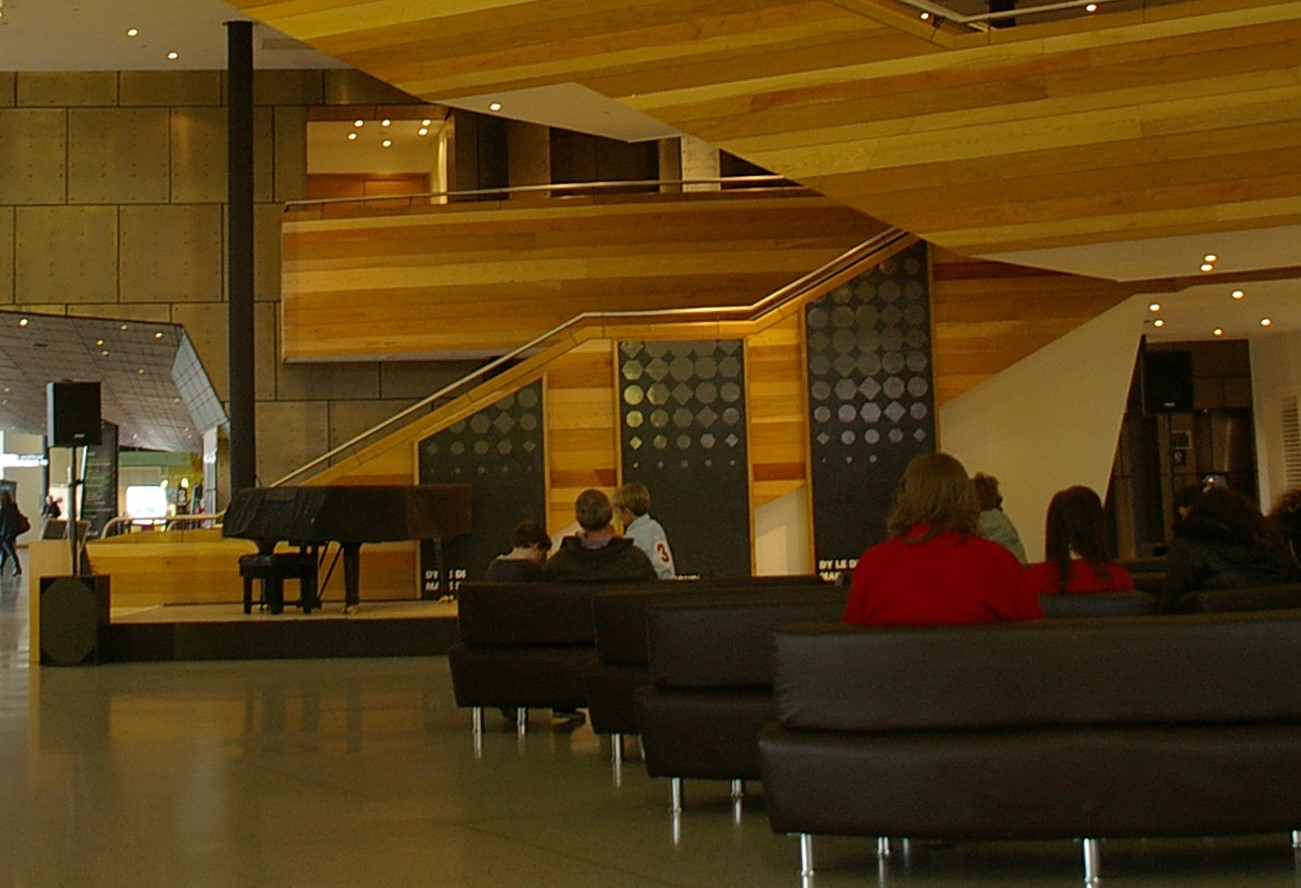
The Glanfa Stage

In addition to the two main theatres, the Donald Gordon Theatre and the Weston Studio, the 37,000-square-metre (400,000 sq ft) phase 1 of Wales Millennium Centre has several function rooms. Urdd Gobaith Cymru has a hostel with overnight accommodation for 153 people in en suite bedrooms, called the Urdd City Sleepover. It also has a performance and teaching space in the Urdd Hall/Theatre, with 153 retractable seats.

The building also includes rehearsal rooms, orchestral facilities for the Welsh National Opera, dance studios and the Blue Room, with seating for up to 100, for National Dance Company Wales in the Dance House.

There are three bars: the Awen Bar on level 2, the Horizons Bar on level 4, and the Stones Bar on level 5. The café-bar Ffwrnais is situated in the foyer, along with the wine bar One. Free performances occasionally take place in the foyer on the Glanfa stage.

=== Design and construction ===
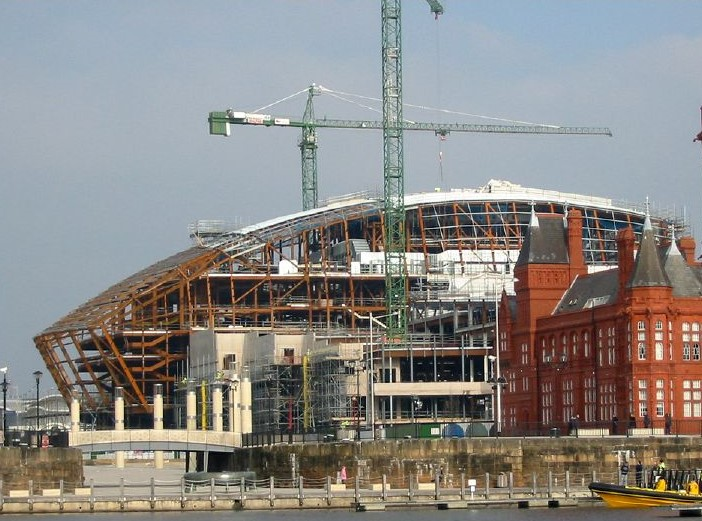
During construction of phase 1

Wales Millennium Centre was designed by Jonathan Adams of local practice Percy Thomas Architects (taken over by Capita Group in 2004), with Arup Acoustics as the acoustic designer and building engineer. His first concept drawings were made in early 1998, and by 1999 his design had started to look more like the building it is today.

Construction began on 25 February 2002. The main contractor was Sir Robert McAlpine Ltd, Kelsey Roofing Industries Ltd was the roofing contractor, and Carr and Angier were theatre consultants. Other contractors included Stent (foundations), Swansea Institute of Higher Education, now part of University of Wales Trinity Saint David (glass), GH James Cyf (stonemasonry), Rimex (stainless steel), Alfred McAlpine (slate), Coed Cymru (wood), Ann Catrin Evans (door furniture) and Amber Hiscott (etchings on glass walls).

The architect's concept was a building that expressed "Welshness" and was instantly recognisable. The building was designed to reflect many different parts of Wales with local Welsh materials that dominate its history: slate, metal, wood and glass. Many of the materials used come from Wales, including 1,350 tonnes of Welsh slate. A million metres of electric cable and 300,000 concrete blocks were also used in construction.

==== Slate ====
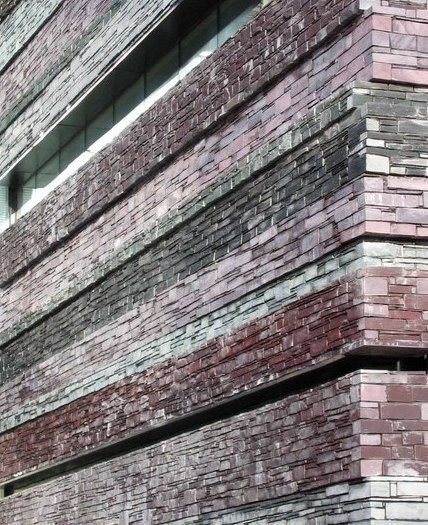
Multi-coloured layers of slate

The exterior of the building is clad in multi-coloured slate collected from Welsh quarries. Narrow windows are built into the layers of slate to give the impression of rock strata in sea cliffs. The purple slate came from the Penrhyn Quarry, the blue from Cwt y Bugail Quarry, the green from the Nantlle Valley, the grey from Llechwedd quarry, and the black from the Corris Quarry.

I always loved going to Ogmore and Southerndown. I thought the cliffs there looked like a building anyway. A building capable of withstanding the roughest weather for hundreds of years. The older they get, the better they look. I wondered if it would be possible to make a building which had the same qualities as these magnificent cliffs. To do that I needed a lot of stone. Normal stone for buildings has to be specially cut into blocks; it takes a long time to make and costs a fortune. But in north Wales the historic slate industry has left behind whole mountains of waste stone that no-one wants. This was stone cut from the mountainside for nearly two hundred years but which wasn't good enough to make roof slates. Over 90% was thrown away. But it was ideal for making walls like the one I had in mind... —architect Jonathan Adams

==== Metal ====
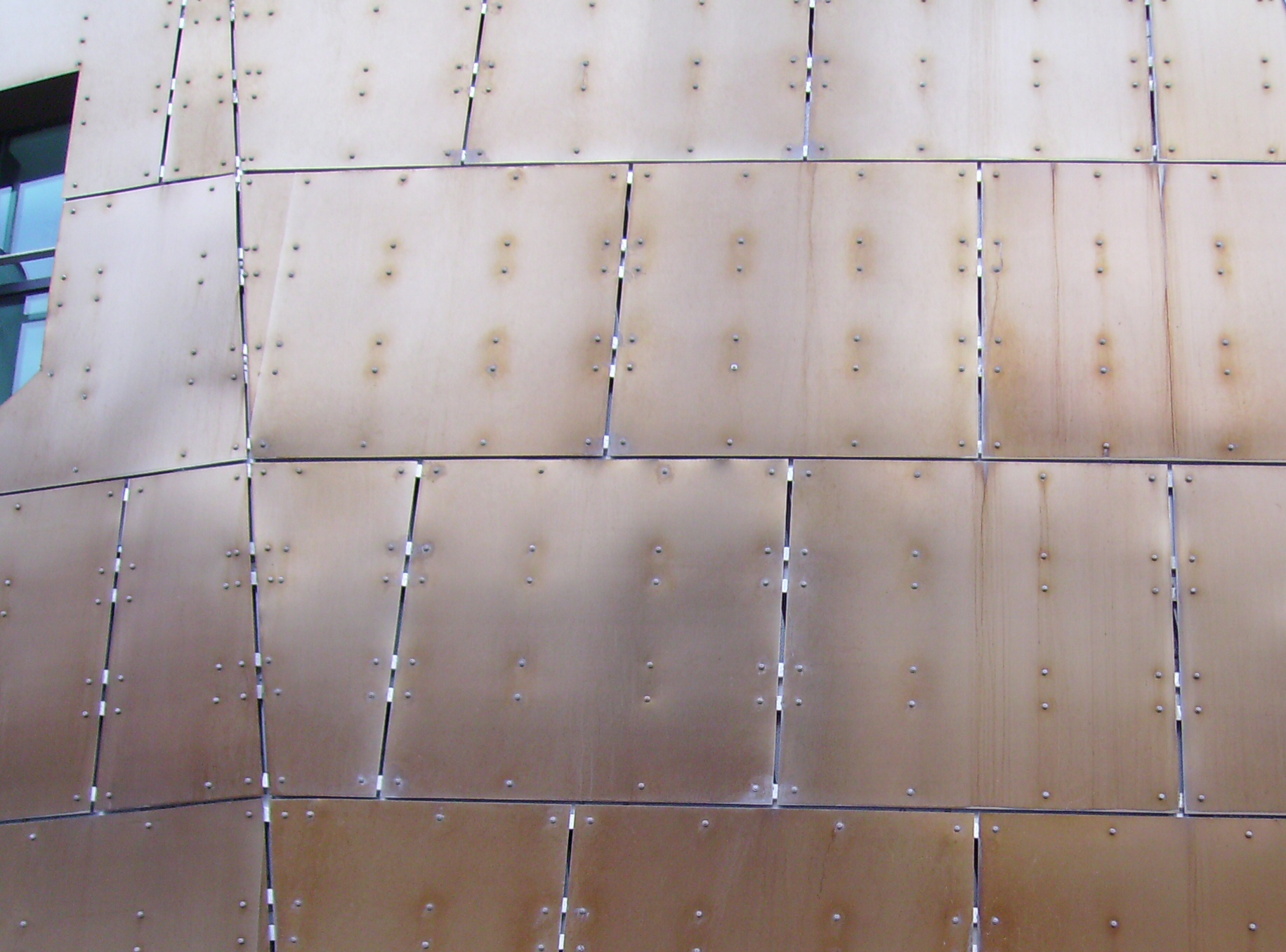
Copper oxide coated sheet steel cladding

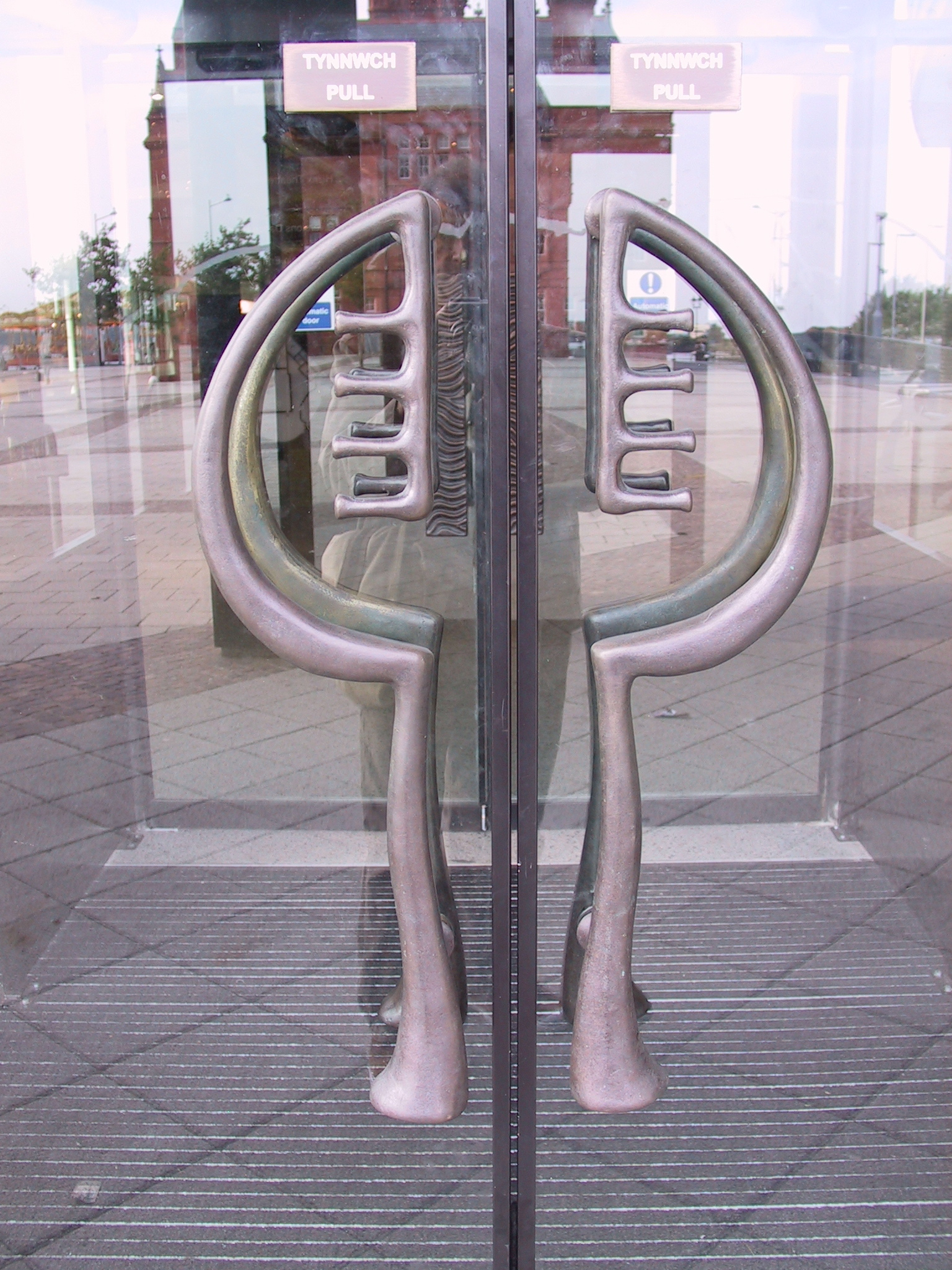
Door furniture designed by Ann Catrin Evans

Wales Millennium Centre's main feature, the bronze coloured dome which covers the Donald Gordon Theatre, is clad in stainless steel. The light bronze colour is an optical effect, rather than an applied colour, and is created by the 'Rimex' chemical process which thickens the transparent oxide coating of the metal to cause light interference, as occurs in natural iridescence. It was designed to withstand the weather conditions on the Cardiff Bay waterfront and to look increasingly better with age. The architect, Jonathan Adams, decided not to use copper and aluminium as they would both change colour with age and weather conditions.

We all know that steel making has been important to south Wales, just as slate making has changed the landscape of the north. We have to use a special type of steel that won't go rusty near to the salt-laden, maritime air of Cardiff Bay. This stainless steel will be made near to Pontypool. For the Wales Millennium Centre I thought it was important that the materials should have a "natural" texture, and that they should be instantly recognisable to anyone seeing them, even from a distance. For this reason I felt it was important that the steel of the shell should have the rough grain and the riveted pattern that we think of as more typical of old industrial structures, such as those that used to be commonplace around the landscape of the industrial south. —Jonathan Adams

==== Wood ====
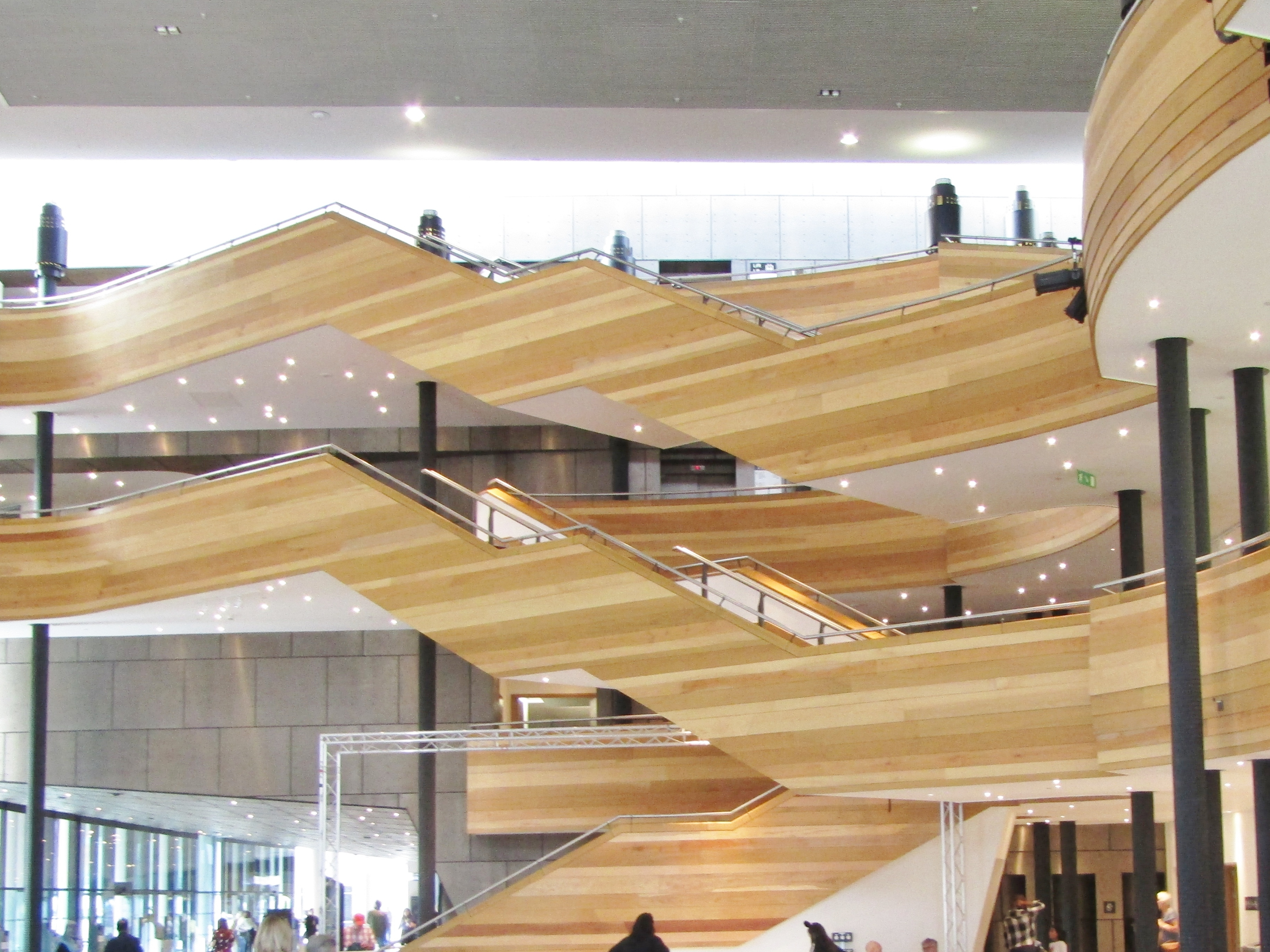
Wood used on the stairs and balconies in the building

Both the inside and outside of the building – including the main Donald Gordon Theatre, the balconies and the rear of the building – are dominated by bands of hardwood lining the walls.

Like the exterior of the building, the principal internal spaces are designed to make the best use of natural materials in their natural state. The structure and detail of the concourse galleries echo the form of the exterior, with the curving strata formed in native hardwoods. Oak, ash, beech, sycamore, alder, birch, chestnut and cherry woods from renewable sources in mid-Wales will be used together in proportions that reflect their relative availability from the forest. The design of the concourse galleries is intended to evoke the image of the edge of the forest, partly as a counterpoint to the coastal nature of the exterior, and partly because the edge of the forest in folklore and mythology represents a line between the real world and the magical world, a line which resembles the front edge of the theatre stage. The form of trees is created by the interweaving curvature of the gallery edges, and by the random positioning of the supporting columns. —Jonathan Adams

==== Glass ====
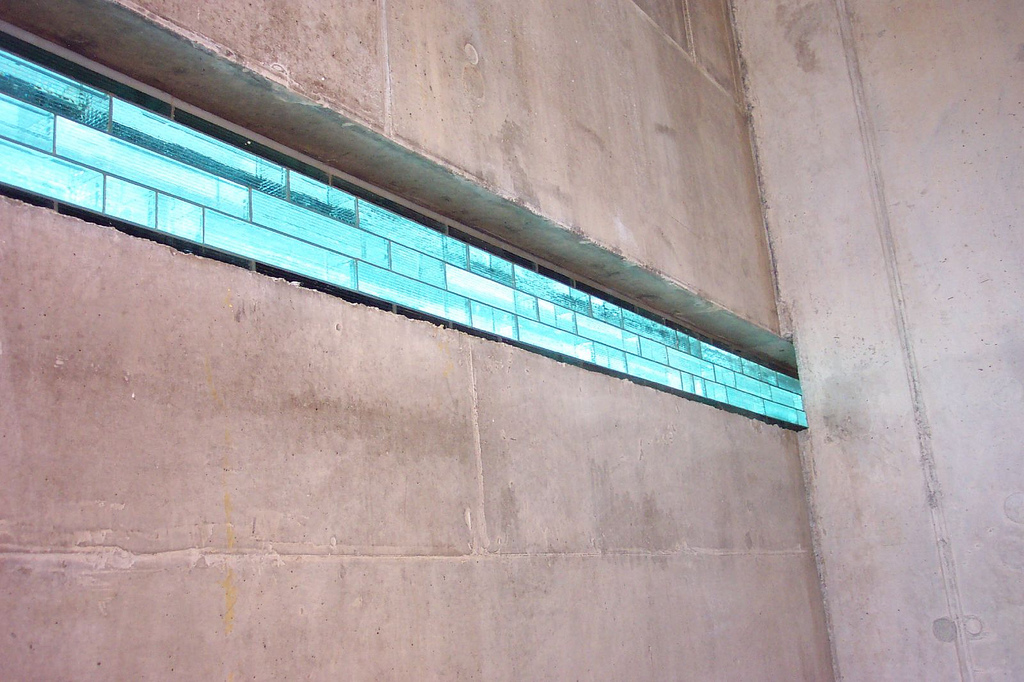
Glass: Bands of glass from the inside

Glass was used to incorporate into the bands of slate. It is 15-centimetre (5.9 in) thick and was cut and installed by the Architectural Glass Department at Swansea Institute of Higher Education. Glass is not used in the contemporary British architectural style of the glass curtain.

Jonathan Adams said, "The glass veins in the external walls of the Wales Millennium Centre make use of conventional glass in a unique way: the sheets of glass are stacked together and fused in a kiln to form solid blocks."

==== Calligraphy ====
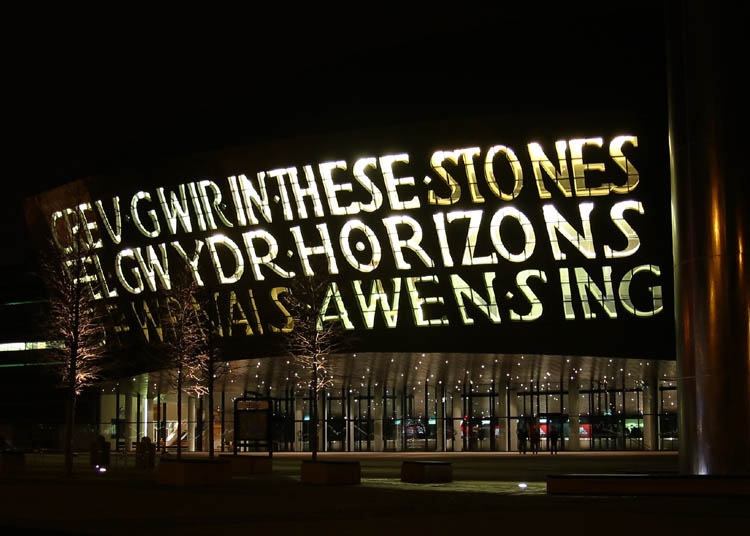
Calligraphy: Wales Millennium Centre illuminated at night

The inscription in the front of the building in Welsh reads:
CREU GWIR
FEL GWYDR
O FFWRNAIS AWEN
The inscription in English reads:
IN THESE STONES
HORIZONS
SING

Inscribed on the front of the dome, above the main entrance are two lines written by Welsh poet Gwyneth Lewis in Welsh and English. The lettering is formed by windows in the upstairs bar areas and is internally illuminated at night.

The idea of this monumental inscription comes from Roman classical architecture. The Romans brought Christianity to these islands, along with the custom of engraving stone. The form of the Celtic cross embodies the cross-fertilisation of indigenous and Roman cultures, from which the Welsh nation first emerged. The monumental inscription is a familiar feature of Roman architecture. The inscription over the entrance of the Wales Millennium Centre is a revival of this classical tradition, and also a recognition of the formative influence of Roman culture upon our nation. We're lucky to have two languages: one that we share with half the world and one which belongs just to us. Words in songs, stories and poems have helped to make Wales the proud country that it is. —Jonathan Adams

The internal and external windows

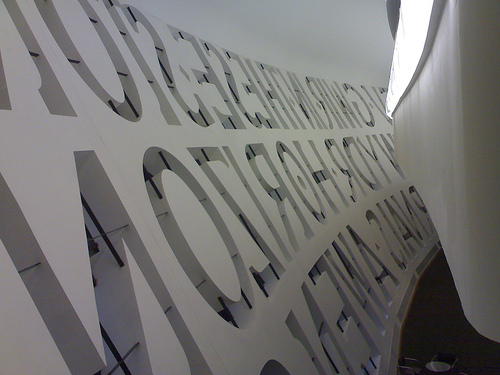
Internal windows in bar area

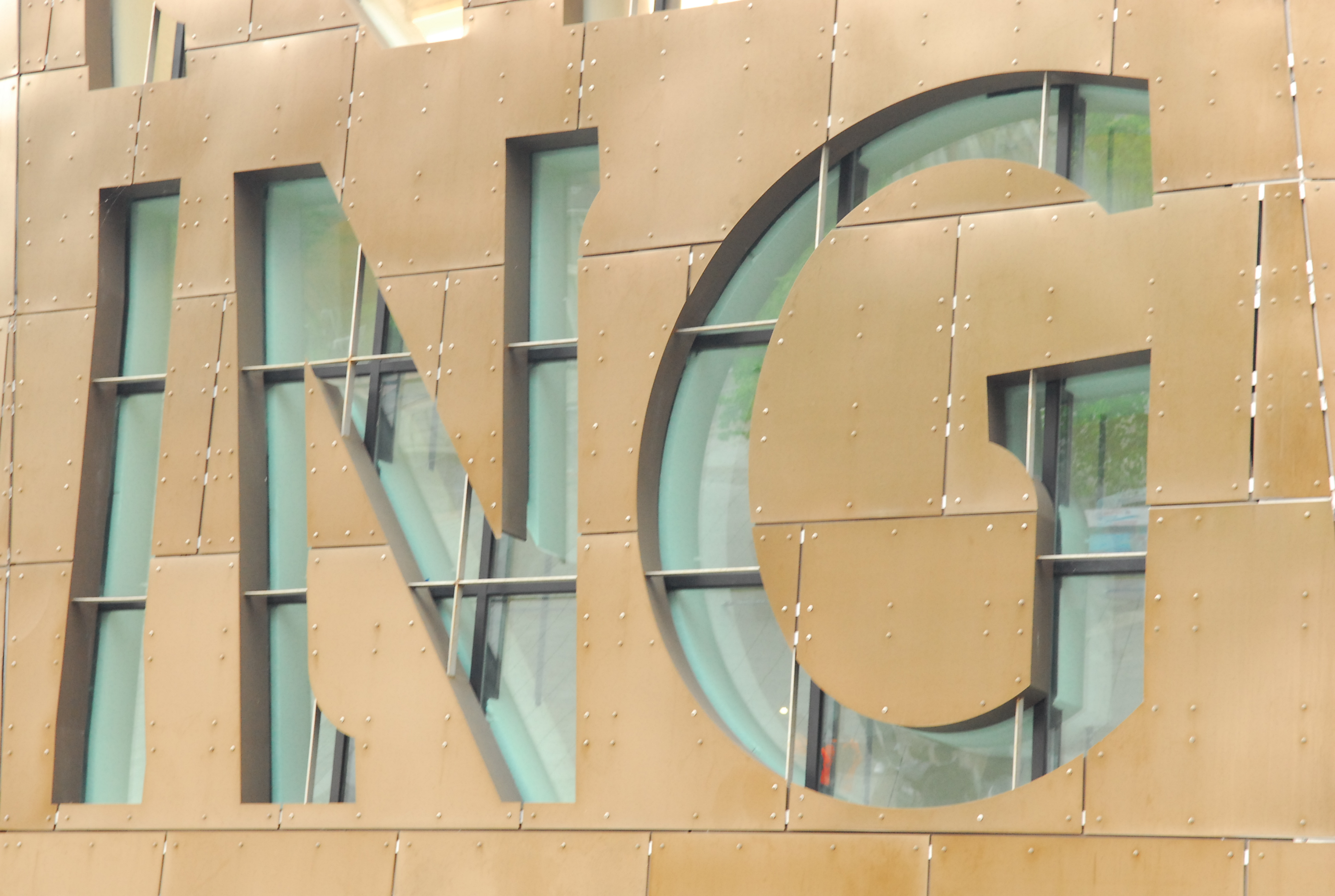
External detail of the windows

Gwyneth Lewis said of the inscription:

I wanted the words to reflect the architecture of the building. Its copper dome reminded me of the furnaces from Wales's industrial heritage and also Ceridwen's cauldron, from which the early poet Taliesin received his inspiration ('awen'). Awen suggests both poetic inspiration and the general creative vision by which people and societies form their aspirations. [...] It was important to me that the English words on the building should not simply be a translation of the Welsh, that they should have their own message. The strata of the slate frontage of the Wales Millennium Centre reminded me of the horizons just beyond Penarth Head. The sea has, traditionally, been for Cardiff the means by which the Welsh export their best to the world and the route by which the world comes to Cardiff. The stones inside the theatre literally sing with opera, musicals and orchestral music, and I wanted to convey the sense of an international space created by the art of music. —Gwyneth Lewis

In These Stones Horizons Sing is also an orchestral work, composed by Karl Jenkins and commissioned by Wales Millennium Centre for the building's opening.

=== Opening weekend ceremony ===
The building was officially opened on the weekend of 26–28 November 2004. Bryn Terfel organised the ceremony and was the creative director of the weekend.

==== Day 1 – 26 November 2004 ====
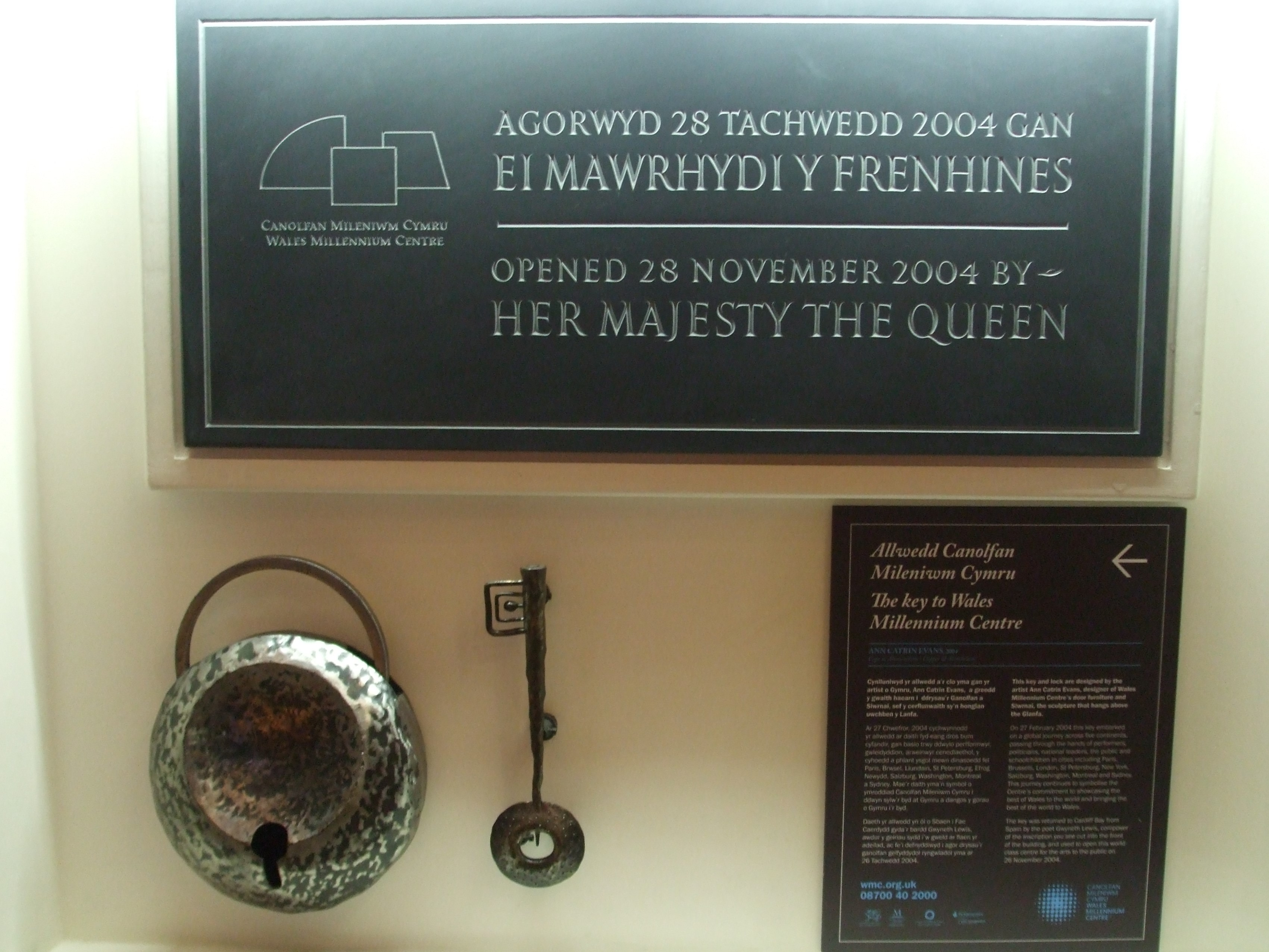
Plaque to commemorate the opening of the Wales Millennium Centre

The day started with a speech from Wales Millennium Centre chairman Lord Rowe-Beddoe, who declared that the proceedings were underway. This was followed by a speech from Rhodri Morgan, the First Minister, who stressed that the new arts centre belonged to the whole nation, that it was for all of the people of Wales and not just for the elite.

The building was opened by Janet Thickpenny, a young mother from Barry, who was chosen because her 40th birthday coincided with the opening day. A human chain delivered the symbolic key, designed and cast by Ann Catrin Evans, to Janet. This was accompanied by a fanfare from the National Youth Brass Band of Wales to Karl Jenkins's specially commissioned work In These Stones Horizons Sing, and Wales Millennium Centre was open.

The evening celebrations began with Cymru for the World, which celebrated the achievements of five leading Welsh artists: Gwyneth Jones, Shirley Bassey, Siân Phillips, Alun Hoddinott and Richard Burton, represented by his daughter Kate Burton. This included tributes from Robert Hardy, Jonathan Pryce, Derek Jacobi, Nana Mouskouri, Catrin Finch, Ruth Madoc and Ian McKellen. The concert was directed by Ken Caswell and conducted by David Charles Abell.

Bryn Terfel started with a short speech and introduced the Wales Millennium Centre singers and dancers, who in hard hats and donkey jackets sang and danced the story of the building's construction. They were later joined by all 322 participants in a chorus, including Gwyn Hughes Jones and Bryn Terfel. Dennis O'Neill sang a duet from Pearl Fishers. Diversions performed a new ballet based on one of Alun Hoddinott's works. The Welsh National Opera performed the final scene of Beethoven's Fidelio in their new home. The evening ranged included many types of music, from popular to classical.

==== Day 2 – 27 November 2004 ====
On the second day, the doors opened for the public to explore the building. A continuous stream of people filled through the building during the day, which concluded with a fireworks display in the Roald Dahl Plass.

==== Day 3 – 28 November 2004 ====
The final day of the opening weekend began with the arrival of Queen Elizabeth II, Prince Philip and the Prince of Wales, who met First Minister Rhodri Morgan and Lord Rowe-Beddoe, and marked the event by unveiling a plaque. A key was presented to the Queen by Richard Burton's granddaughter, Charlotte Frances. Philip Madoc, Siân Phillips, Gaby Roslin, Michael Ball, Charlotte Church, Catrin Finch and Only Men Aloud! were among the artists that entertained the audience during the first act. The second act was opened by Welsh National Opera and later the Kirov Ballet and Cirque Éloize entertained the audience. Bryn Terfel ended the celebrations.

=== 2022/23 Refurbishment of Phase 1 – Cabaret and Bocs ===
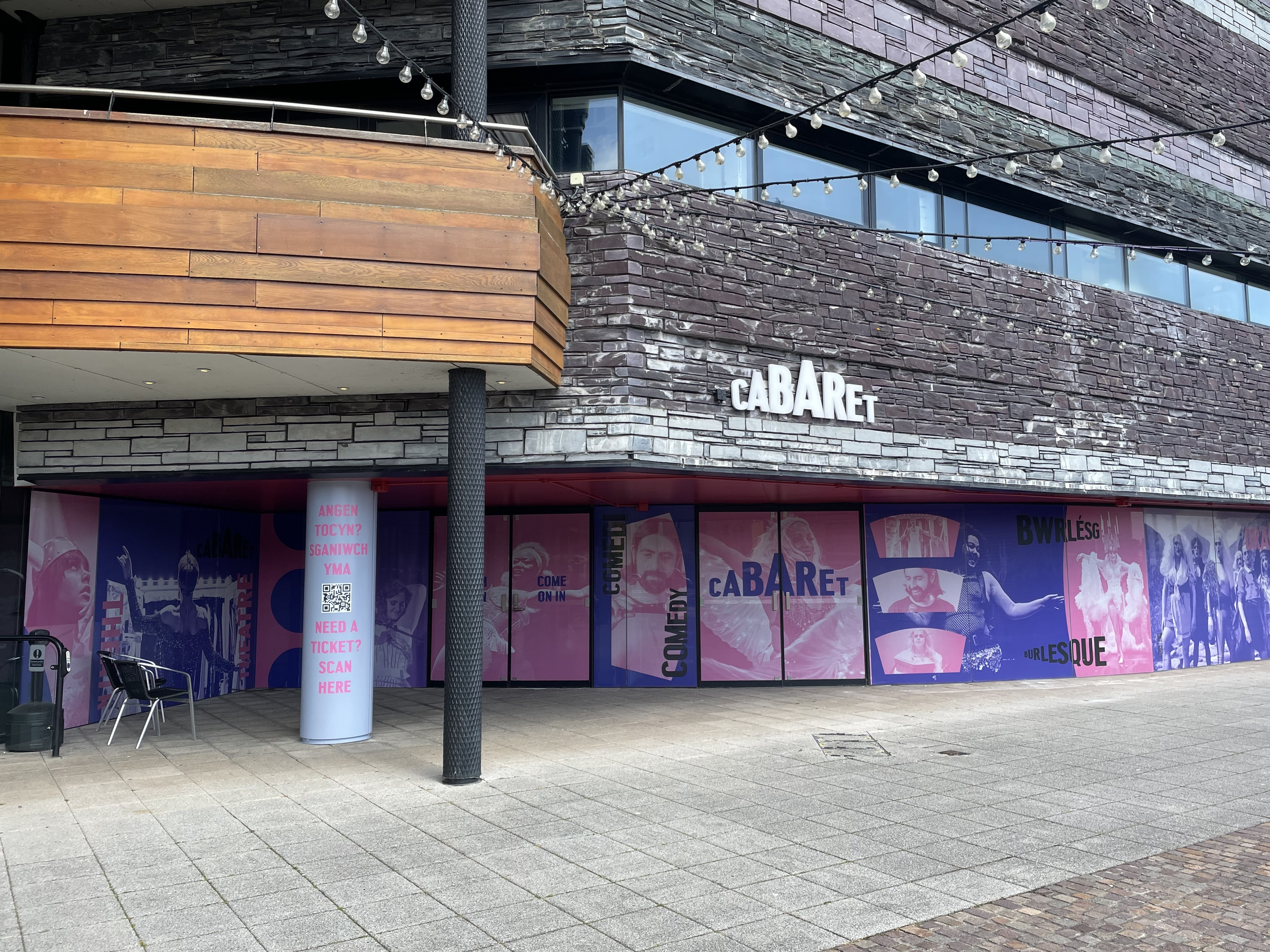
Entrance to Cabaret

The 2022/23 refurbishment of Wales Millennium Centre started with the opening of an immersive theatre space called Bocs (Welsh for box) on 27 August 2022. It has a programme of 360° films and projections, as well as extended reality experiences, including augmented reality, mixed reality and virtual reality. It was announced in September 2022 that a £4 million refurbishment of Wales Millennium Centre would take place and would include an area for cabaret acts, a redesigned foyer and new ticketing office, a 12 m (39 ft) long bar, a members’ bar and lounge, and bespoke seating areas. The new 140-seat cabaret venue, which replaced Ffresh restaurant/bar, is simply called Cabaret. It presents drag, comedy, burlesque, and gig theatre performances and opened in February 2023. The refurbishment was carried out by interior designers Richard H Powell trading as Powell.

=== Awards for Phase 1 ===
- 2005 Gold Medal for Architecture at the National Eisteddfod of Wales
- 2005 RIBA Wales award
- 2005 MIPIM Awards (Hotels & Tourism resorts)
- Sustainability and Environmental Impact award from the British Institute of Facilities Management
- 2005 Interior of the Year award from FX

== Phase 2 – BBC Hoddinott Hall and Grace Williams Studio ==
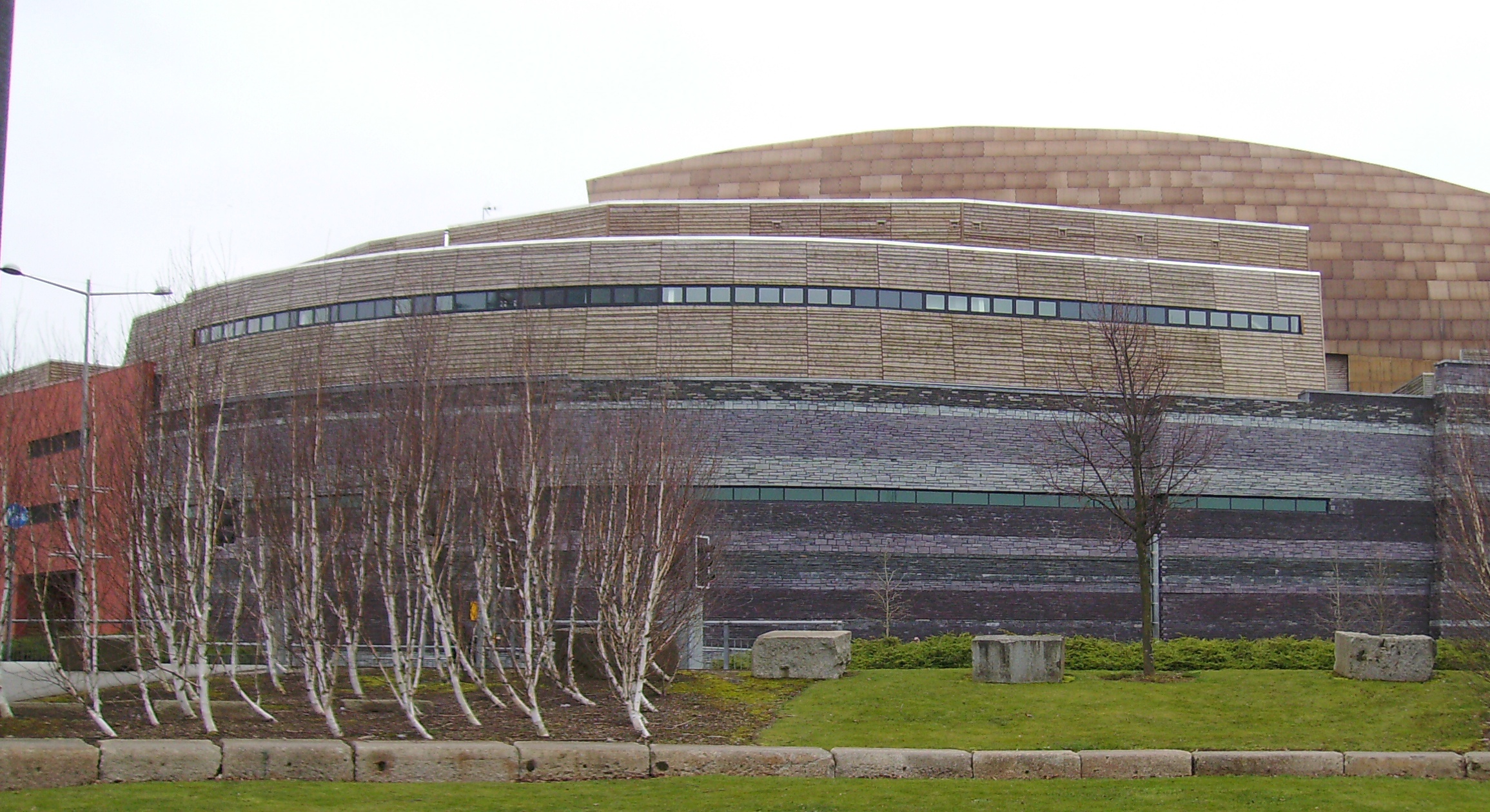
BBC Hoddinott Hall

Phase 2 of Wales Millennium Centre is home to the BBC National Orchestra of Wales (BBC NOW) and the BBC National Chorus of Wales. BBC NOW moved from Studio 1 at Broadcasting House in Llandaff, which the orchestra had outgrown since the late 1960s. Phase 2 opened on 22 January 2009 with an inaugural concert performed by the BBC NOW and conducted by Thierry Fischer. Phase 2 includes the 350-seater BBC Hoddinott Hall (Welsh: Neuadd Hoddinott y BBC), also known simply as Hoddinott Hall, which is named after the late Welsh classical composer Alun Hoddinott (11 August 1929 – 12 March 2008), and the Grace Williams Studio, which is named after another Welsh composer, Grace Williams (19 February 1906 – 10 February 1977), and is used as a centre for education and outreach work. Phase 2 also has space for practice rooms, a music library and backstage facilities, and provides a four-storey office space.

=== Design and construction ===
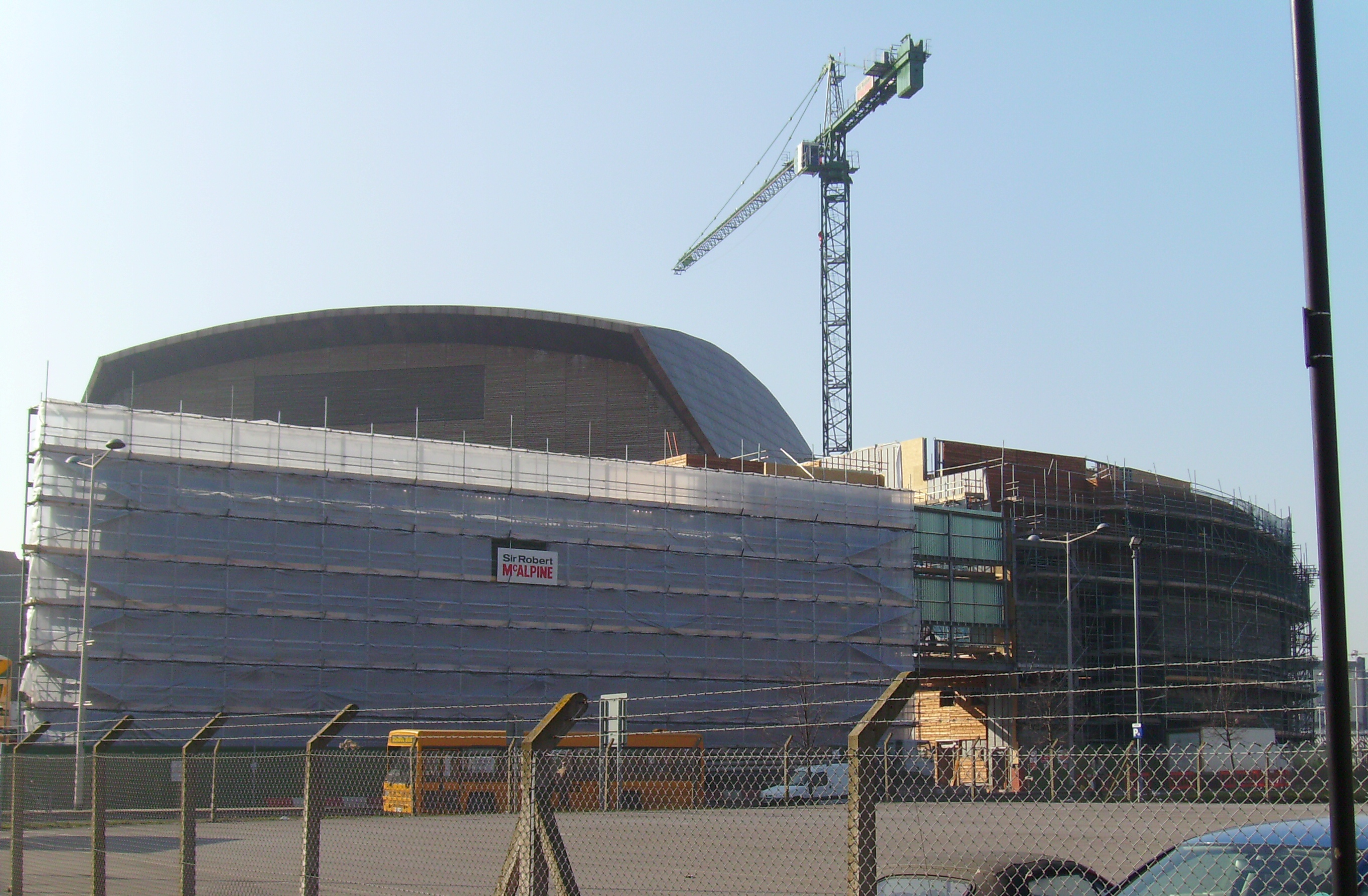
During construction of phase 2 (C Bay)

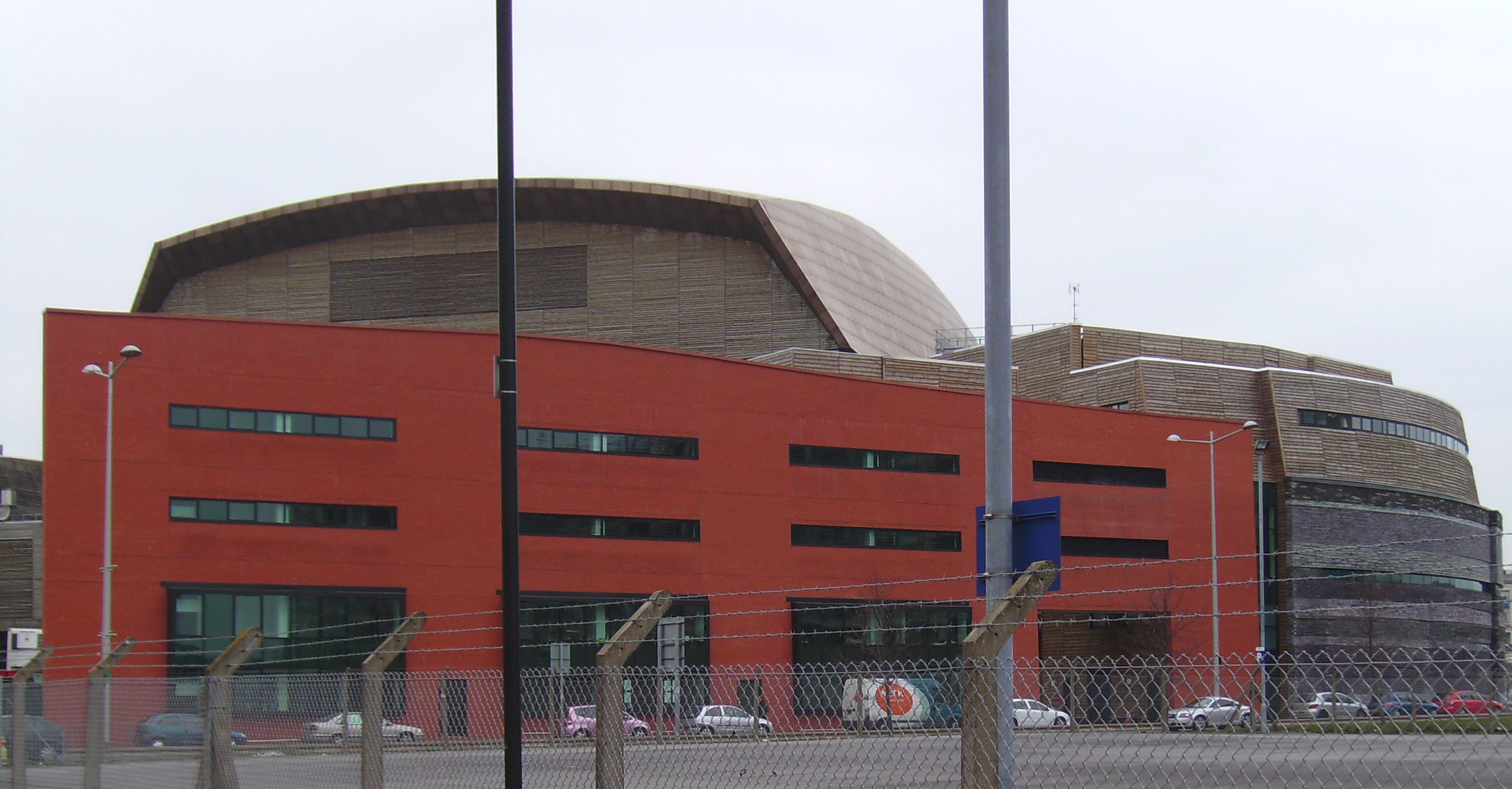
Offices of the Arts Council of Wales (red brick) and BBC Hoddinott Hall (far right – blue slate)

The original plans for Wales Millennium Centre were that it would have a concert hall, but the final design of phase 1 did not include one. Instead, space was left for a concert hall to be built after phase 1 opened in 2004, and construction on phase 2 was then due to begin early in 2005. However, phase 2 construction did not actually begin until April 2007. Phase 2 was designed to fit into Wales Millennium Centre's curved slate frontage, with an upper part constructed from timber.

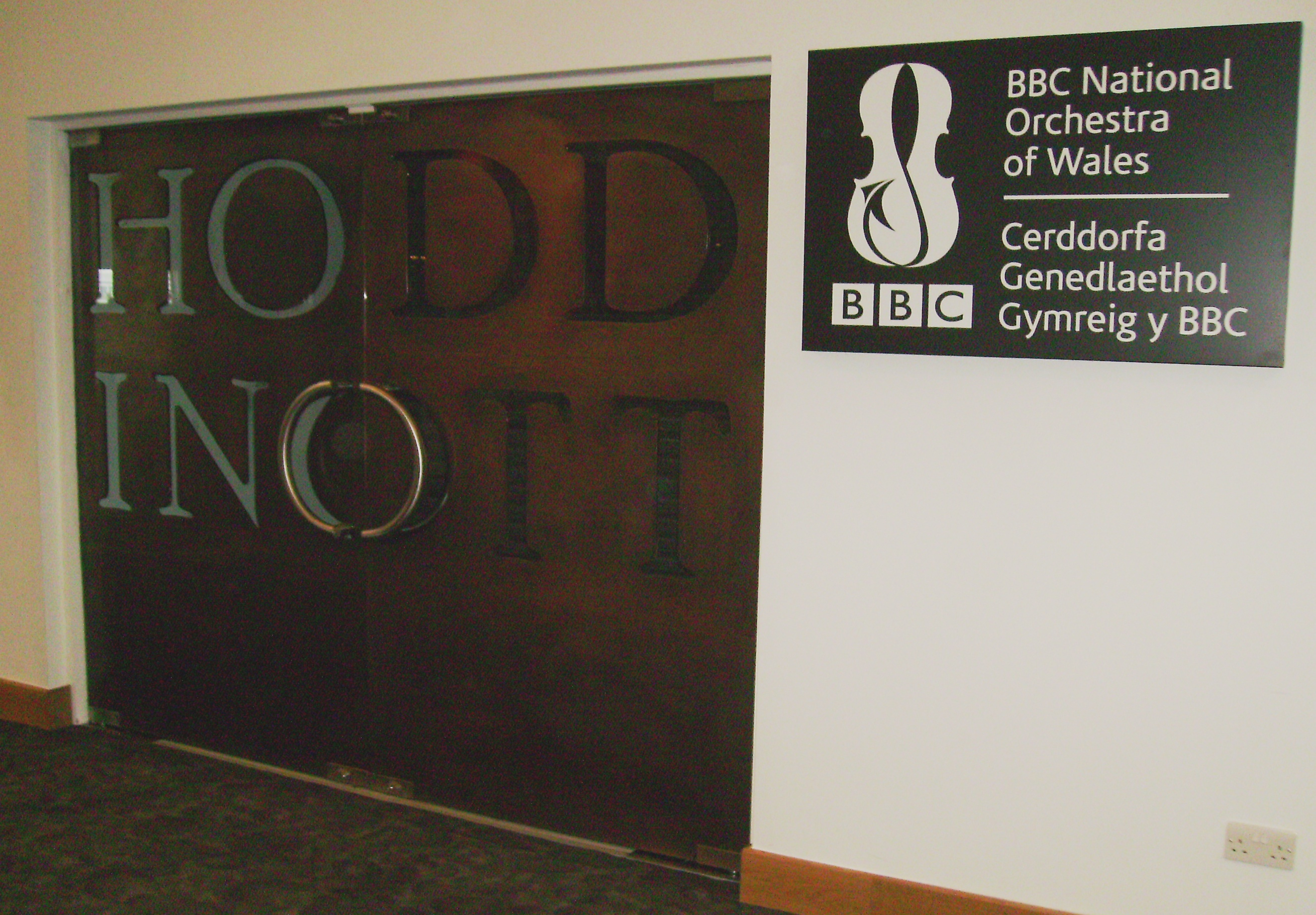
The entrance to the BBC Hoddinott Hall from within the Wales Millennium Centre

Phase 2 of Wales Millennium Centre was designed by the then newly qualified Tim Green and Keith Vince of Capita Architecture, formerly called Capita Percy Thomas and now part of Capita Symonds, with Arup Acoustics again providing the acoustic design. The main contractor was again Sir Robert McAlpine Ltd, with MJN Colston Ltd responsible for the design and installation of all the mechanical, electrical and public health services in the building. Other subcontractors on the project included URS Corporation, Davis Langdon and Hulley & Kirkwood.

Tim Green said that the exterior of phase 2 was designed to be in keeping with phase 1, while the interior had its own theme, that of a traditional Welsh chapel. He said that "The timber treatment at low level is very reminiscent of Victorian chapels and the masonry above. The stonework you would normally get in a stone chapel has been replaced by concrete."

During the design and construction period, the project name for phase 2 was C Bay. Construction began in April 2007. It ended when the keys to the building were handed over at an official ceremony in September 2008, and BBC Wales began to fit out the interior of the Hoddinott Hall.

Phase 2 also includes the 60 seat Grace Williams Studio, which is used by BBC NOW and Chorus for workshops and rehearsals for its outreach work.

=== Opening Festival ===
To commemorate the opening of BBC Hoddinott Hall, an inaugural concert took place on 22 January 2009. It was part of an opening festival which took place between 22 January and 1 February 2009. The concert was performed by the BBC National Orchestra of Wales and was conducted by Thierry Fischer. It included the world premiere of St Vitus in the Kettle by Simon Holt, the orchestra's composer in association, who took over from Michael Berkeley. BBC Hoddinott Hall was officially opened by the Prince of Wales on 31 January 2009, where he unveiled a plaque.

=== Awards for Phase 2 ===
- Engineering Excellence Award from the Association for Consultancy and Engineering.
- 2009 Special Award: Best Use of Panel Products from the Wood Awards

== Phase 3 – The planned digital and immersive arts theatre ==
An artist's impression of the originally proposed digital and immersive arts theatre

The third phase of the development of Wales Millennium Centre is a proposed new stand-alone 550-seater theatre and facilities for production, rehearsal and training, opposite the existing main building (phase 1 and 2). It will be an "immersive" arts theatre and will be located next to the proposed new 15,000-seater indoor arena for Cardiff. Cardiff Council has appointed Goldbeck Construction as the building contractor for the new development.

The new theatre will be located in the car park of the Atlantic Wharf and part of the parking area of Cardiff Council’s County Hall. The building will incorporate the council's new modern headquarters, which will replace the ageing County Hall. The proposed design was revised in August 2026 and is described as a “dual-use civic ensemble”.

== Resident organisations ==
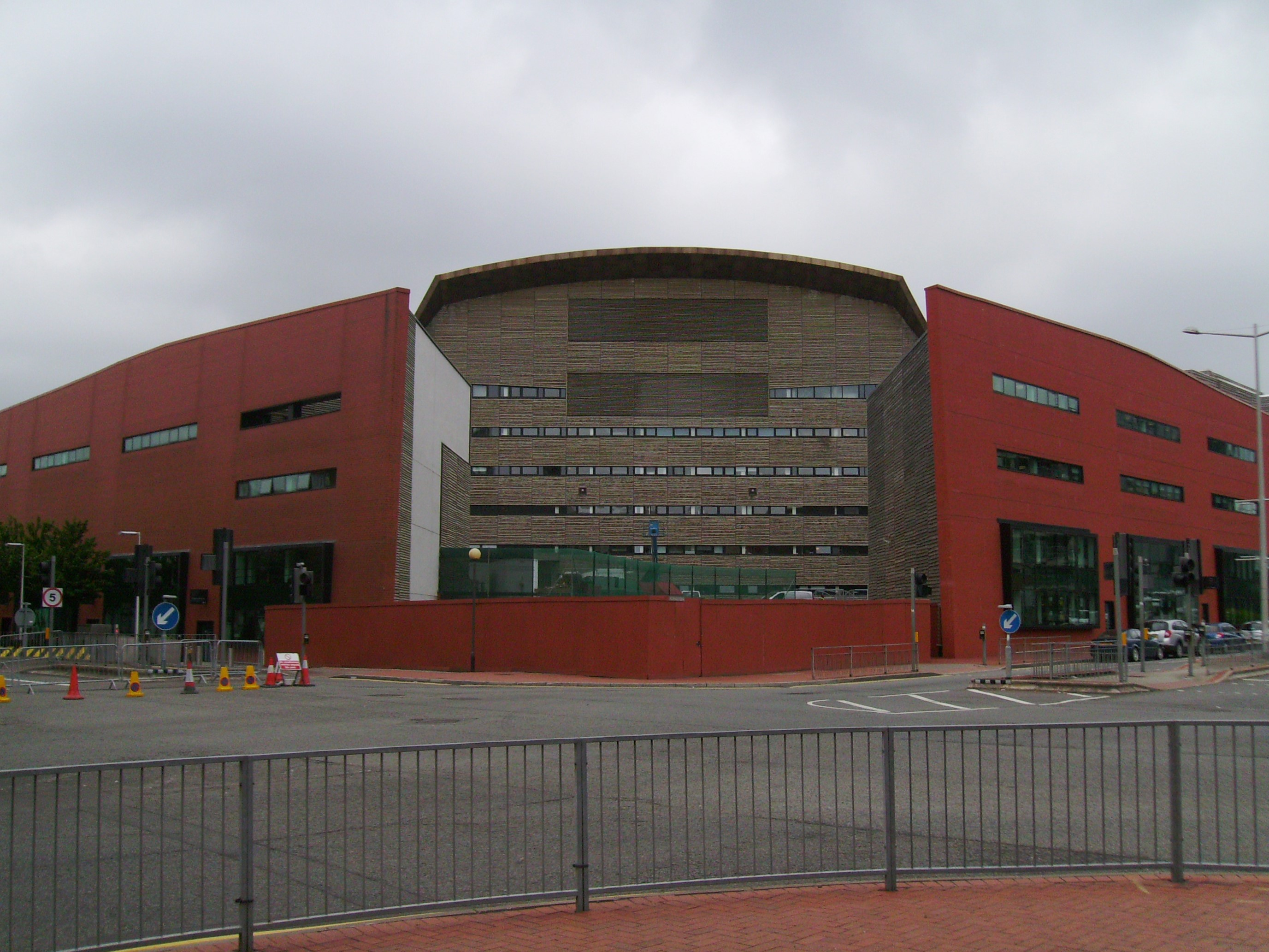
The rear of the building with offices of the National Dance Company Wales, Urdd and Literature Wales (left) and Arts Council of Wales (right))

Wales Millennium Centre is home to eight arts organisations:

- Literature Wales – Welsh national literature promotion agency and society for writers
- National Dance Company Wales – previously known as Diversions
- Hijinx Theatre – one of Europe’s leading inclusive theatre companies
- Two Rhythms – providing multi-sensory, therapeutic arts programmes to people with profound disabilities and autism. Previously known as Touch Trust
- Tŷ Cerdd – music information centre for amateur and professional musicians, including the Welsh Music Information Centre, Welsh Amateur Music Federation, National Youth Arts Wales and Cyfansoddwyr Cymru (Composers of Wales)
- Urdd Gobaith Cymru – Wales's largest youth organisation
- Welsh National Opera – an international touring opera company
- BBC National Orchestra of Wales – the only professional national symphony orchestra for Wales

== Corporate financing and rebranding ==
The total cost of phase 1 of the project was £106.2 million. The National Lottery Millennium Fund provided £31.7 million, a further £37 million came from The National Assembly for Wales and £10.4 million was donated by the Arts Council of Wales. In addition, a private investor, South African businessman Donald Gordon, donated £20 million to be shared equally between the Royal Opera House and Wales Millennium Centre. The Wales Millennium Centre also received a £13.5 million loan from HSBC. The remaining funds for the project came from a major sponsorship deal with the Principality Building Society. The Weston Studio is named after the Garfield Weston Foundation, and is located on Level 1 of the building. Many other corporations and public bodies provide sponsorship to Wales Millennium Centre.

The National Assembly for Wales announced on 6 November 2007 that it was to pay off the outstanding loan of £13.5 million from HSBC and also increase its annual funding. From April 2008, the Assembly gave an annual grant of £3.5 million to Wales Millennium Centre for 3 years. This was intended only to repay the capital debt and not any ongoing operating loss as the organisation remained profitable. The money came from unallocated funds from the Assembly's previous budget and the then Minister for Heritage, Rhodri Glyn Thomas, said that it would not come at the expense of other art projects in Wales.

The cost of phase 2 of the project was approximately £18 million. The BBC does not own the building, but has leased it for 25 years from the Lime Property Fund, a subsidiary of Aviva Investors. Phase 2 was built by Concert Bay Ltd, a subsidiary of Sir Robert McAlpine Enterprises Ltd, which co-funded the scheme along with Lime Property Fund.

In November 2006, Wales Millennium Centre announced that it would begin a two-phase rebranding project. The project was won by a local Cardiff company, Sweet. The first phase of the project involved a new corporate logo; the second phase included the redesign of other marketing tools, such as brochures and advertisements.

== In popular culture ==
=== Doctor Who and Torchwood ===
Wales Millennium Centre has made numerous appearances in film and television, including in Doctor Who (modern-era episodes of which are produced locally by BBC Wales). It has appeared 7 times to date: as itself from outside in the episode "Boom Town"; its marquee momentarily at the end of the episode "Bad Wolf"; its lobby as a hospital lobby in the far future in the episode "New Earth", and again in "The Girl Who Waited"; and briefly in the episodes "Utopia", "The Stolen Earth" and "Last of the Time Lords".

The spin-off series Torchwood has its headquarters, known as "The Hub", set underneath the Water Tower in Roald Dahl Plass, with Wales Millennium Centre's frontage featuring heavily through the show.

=== Jones Jones Jones ===
On 3 November 2006, a record-breaking attempt to gather the most people with the same surname, Jones, took place at Wales Millennium Centre under the show banner Jones Jones Jones, filmed for television by S4C. The record was broken with 1,224 Joneses filling the Donald Gordon Theatre. The previous record was set in Sweden in 2004 when 583 people gathered who had the same surname of Norberg.

=== Gavin & Stacey ===
The airport scene from episode 1 of the second series of the BBC TV show Gavin & Stacey was filmed in Wales Millennium Centre.
