= List of places in Cardiff =

Places in the capital city of Wales

This is a listing of places in Cardiff, county and capital city of Wales.

== Administrative divisions ==
=== Electoral wards ===
This is a list of electoral wards covered by Cardiff Council:

- Adamsdown
- Butetown
- Caerau
- Canton
- Cathays
- Creigiau & St. Fagans
- Cyncoed
- Ely
- Fairwater
- Gabalfa
- Grangetown
- Heath
- Llandaff North
- Llanishen
- Lisvane & Thornhill
- Llandaff
- Llanrumney
- Pentwyn
- Pentyrch
- Penylan
- Plasnewydd
- Pontprennau & Old St. Mellons
- Radyr & Morganstown
- Rhiwbina
- Riverside
- Rumney
- Splott
- Trowbridge
- Whitchurch & Tongwynlais

=== Communities ===
- Adamsdown
- Butetown
- Caerau
- Canton
- Castle
- Cathays
- Creigiau
- Cyncoed
- Danescourt
- Ely
- Fairwater
- Gabalfa
- Grangetown
- Heath
- Lisvane
- Llandaff
- Llandaff North
- Llanedeyrn
- Llanishen
- Llanrumney
- Old St Mellons
- Pentwyn
- Pentyrch
- Pontcanna
- Pontprennau
- Radyr and Morganstown
- Rhiwbina
- Riverside
- Roath (previously Plasnewydd)
- Rumney
- Splott
- St Mellons
- St Fagans
- Thornhill
- Tongwynlais
- Tremorfa
- Trowbridge
- Whitchurch

== City Centre ==
The city centre is Cardiff's main shopping area, the sixth largest in the UK. It is also the location of historical and cultural attractions such as:

- Cardiff Castle
- Millennium Stadium
- New Theatre
- St David's Hall
- Sherman Theatre
- Motorpoint Arena (formerly Cardiff International Arena)
- Victorian arcades (listed under covered shopping malls)
- Queens Arcade
- Capitol Centre
- St. David's Shopping Centre

=== Civic Centre ===
The Civic Centre is built from white Portland stone, and location of much of:

- Cardiff University
- National Museum and Gallery of Wales
- Cardiff City Hall
- Crown Buildings
- Cardiff Crown Court
- Temple of Peace

== Cardiff Bay ==
Formerly called Tiger Bay, this was where the world's first million-pound cheque was signed and was the centre of the global coal industry in the 19th and 20th centuries. In the 1980s the Cardiff Bay Development Corporation was set up to redevelop the area and has since been transformed into a high-profile area of living, shopping, dining and culture attractions, such as:

- Red Dragon Centre
- Mermaid Quay
- Wales Millennium Centre
- Senedd
- Techniquest
- The Coal Exchange
- St David's Hotel & Spa
- Cardiff Bay Wetlands Reserve

=== Cardiff International Sports Village ===
The International Sports Village is a work in progress in Cardiff, with additional sporting and retail sites being added every so often.

- Cardiff International Pool
- Cardiff International White Water
- Cardiff Arena
- Ice Arena Wales

== Buildings ==
=== Covered markets and shopping centres ===
- Cardiff Market
- Capitol Centre
- Queens Arcade
- St. David's Shopping Centre
- Royal Arcade
- Castle Arcade
- Morgan Arcade
- High Street Arcade
- Duke Street Arcade
- Dominions Arcade
- Wyndham Arcade

=== Leisure centres ===
- Eastern Leisure Centre
- Fairwater Leisure Centre
- Llanishen Leisure Centre
- Western Leisure Centre
- Pentwyn Leisure Centre
- Channel View Leisure Centre
- Cardiff International Pool
- Maindy Centre
- Star Centre

=== Public libraries ===
- Canton Library
- Cathays Library
- Central Library
- Ely and Caerau Community Hub
- Fairwater Library
- Grangetown Library
- Llandaff North Library
- Llanedeyrn Library
- Llanishen Library
- Llanrumney Library
- Penylan Library
- Radyr Library
- Roath Library Closed 2015
- Rhiwbina Library
- Rhydypennau Library
- Rumney Library
- Splott Library
- St Mellons Library
- Tongwynlais Library
- Whitchurch Library

=== Police stations ===
- Cardiff Bay (area headquarters)
- Cardiff Central

== Historical ==
=== Communities that no longer exist ===
- Crockherbtown
- Newtown
- Temperance Town
- Tredegarville

=== Notable buildings that no longer exist ===
- Avana Bakery (Grangetown)
- National Stadium, Cardiff Arms Park
- Cardiff Central bus station, Central Square (demolished 2008)
- Central Hotel, Penarth Road/St Mary Street, a Grade II listed hotel which closed after 120 years and was gutted by fire in 2003. The site was later redeveloped.
- Ely Paperworks (Wiggins Teape)
- Ely Racecourse
- Wales Empire Pool, demolished 1998 to make way for the Millennium Stadium
- Fire Station, Westgate Street (notable classical facade)
- JR Freeman cigar factory (Grangetown), later owned by Gallaher Group
- The Friary (foundations were removed to build the Capital Tower)
- Guildford Crescent Baths demolished 1985
- Llandaff fields Lido
- St Mary's parish church (destroyed by flooding 17th century)
- RAF Pengam Moors, formerly Splott Aerodrome and Cardiff Municipal Airport
- Sophia Gardens Pavilion (music and entertainment venue)
- Swiss Bridge at Cardiff Castle (demolished 1963)
- Tram depot, Ely
- Wood Street Congregational Chapel (replaced by Southgate House)
- Cardiff power stations (demolished about 1970)
- The Victorian Queen Street railway station (replaced by the 1973 station)
- Capitol Theatre
- Wales National Ice Rink
- Allders Department Store, former Mackross store, Queen Street
- Thomson House, former home of the Western Mail and South Wales Echo newspapers

== Geographical ==
=== Rivers and waterways ===
Rivers

- River Taff
- River Ely
- Rhymney River

Canals

- Bute Docks Feeder
- Glamorganshire Canal
- Melingriffith Feeder Canal (Whitchurch)

Weirs

- Blackweir
- Llandaff weir
- Radyr Weir

Lakes and reservoirs

- Roath Park Lake
- Llanishen Reservoir
- Pentwyn Lake

=== Woods ===
- Plymouth woods
- Leckwith woods
- Long Wood (Forest farm)

== Educational establishments ==
=== Higher Education ===
- Cardiff University
- Cardiff Metropolitan University (formerly UWIC)
- University of South Wales (formerly University of Glamorgan and University of Wales, Newport)
- Royal Welsh College of Music & Drama
- St. Michael's College, Llandaff (theological college)

=== Further Education ===
- Cardiff and Vale College
- St David's Catholic College
- Cardiff Sixth Form College

=== Primary and Secondary Education ===
Adamsdown

- Adamsdown Primary School
- Stacey Primary School
- Tredegarville Primary School

Birchgrove

- Birchgrove Primary School

Butetown

- Mount Stuart Primary School
- St Cuthbert's Roman Catholic Primary School
- St Mary The Virgin Church in Wales Primary School
- Ysgol Gynradd Gymraeg Hamadryad

Caerau

- Glyn Derw High School
- Woodlands High School
- Riverbank School
- Millbank Primary School
- Trelai Primary School
- Caerau Infant School
- Cwrt-Yr-Ala Junior School

Canton

- Fitzalan High School
- Lansdowne Primary School
- Radnor Primary School
- Ysgol Gymraeg Pwll Coch
- Ysgol Gymraeg Treganna
- Severn Infant School
- Severn Junior School

Cathays

- Cathays High School
- Gladstone Primary School
- Cardiff Muslim Primary School
- St Monica's Church in Wales Primary School

Coryton

- Coryton Primary School

Creigiau

- Cregiau Primary School

Cyncoed

- Cardiff High School
- Lakeside Primary School
- Rhydypenau Primary School

Ely

- Michaelston Community College (Formerly Glan Ely High School)
- Herbert Thompson Primary School
- St Fagan's Church in Wales Primary School
- St Francis Roman Catholic Primary School
- Hywel Dda Infant School
- Hywel Dda Junior School
- Windsor Clive Infant School
- Windsor Clive Junior School

Fairwater

- Bishop Hannon High School (closed 1987)
- Cantonian High School
- Bishop of Llandaff Church in Wales High School
- Ysgol Gyfun Gymraeg Plasmawr
- Fairwater Primary School
- Holy Family Roman Catholic Primary School
- Pentrebane Primary School
- Peter Lea Primary School
- Ysgol Gymraeg Coed-Y-Gof

Gabalfa

- Allensbank Primary School
- Gabalfa Primary School
- Ysgol Mynydd Bychan
- St Joseph's Roman Catholic Primary School
- St Monica's Church in Wales Primary School

Grangetown

- Grangetown Primary School
- Ninian Park Primary School
- St Patrick's Roman Catholic Primary School
- St Paul's Church in Wales Primary School

Heath

- Ton-Yr-Ywen Primary School

Lisvane

- Corpus Christi Roman Catholic High School
- Llysfaen Primary School

Llandaff

- The Cathedral School, Llandaff
- Howell's School, Llandaff
- Bishop of Llandaff Church in Wales High School
- Llandaff Church in Wales Primary School
- Ysgol Pencae
- Danescourt Infant School
- Danescourt Junior School

Llandaff North

- Ysgol Gyfun Gymraeg Glantaf
- Meadowbank School
- Hawthorn Infant School
- Hawthorn Junior School

Llanedeyrn

- Llanedeyrn High School
- Llanedeyrn Primary School

Llanishen

- Llanishen High School
- Cefn Onn Primary School
- Christ the King Roman Catholic Primary School
- Coed Glas Primary School
- Ysgol Y Wern
- The Court School

Llanrumney

- Llanrumney High School
- Bryn Hafod Primary School
- Glan-yr-Afon Primary School
- Pen-y-Bryn Primary School
- St Cadoc's Roman Catholic Primary School
- St Mellon's Church in Wales Primary School
- Ysgol Bro Eirwg

Pentwyn

- All Saints Primary School
- Bryn Celyn Primary School
- The Hollies School
- Springwood Primary School
- St Bernadette's Roman Catholic Primary School
- St David's Church in Wales Primary School
- St Peter Evan's Roman Catholic Primary School
- Ysgol Y Berllan Deg
- Glyncoed Infant & Nursery School
- Glyncoed Junior School
- St Philip Evans Roman Catholic Primary School

Pentyrch

- Pentyrch Primary School
- Ysgol Gynradd Gwaelod Y Garth Primary School

Penylan

- St Teilo's Church in Wales High School
- Ysgol Gyfun Gymraeg Bro Edern
- Ty Gwyn School
- Marlborough Infant School
- Marlborough Junior School

Pontprennau

- Pontprennau Primary School

Radyr & Morganstown

- Radyr Comprehensive School
- Bryn Deri Primary School
- Radyr Primary School

Rhiwbina

- Greenhill School
- Llanishen Fach Primary School
- Rhiwbeina Primary School
- Greenhill School

Riverside

- Kitchener Primary School
- St Mary's Catholic Primary School

Roath

- Albany Primary School
- St Peter's Roman Catholic Primary School
- Taibah Muslim Primary School
- St Anne's Church in Wales Infant School

Rumney

- Eastern High School, Cardiff
- St Illtyd's Catholic High School
- Greenway Primary School
- Rumney Primary School

Splott

- Baden Powell Primary School
- Moorland Primary School
- St Alban's Roman Catholic Primary School
- Ysgol Glan Morfa

Thornhill

- Thornhill Primary School

Tongwynlais

- Tongwynlais Primary School

Tremorfa

- Willows High School

Trowbridge

- Bishop Childs Church in Wales Primary School
- Meadowlane Primary School
- Oakfield Primary School
- St John Lloyd Roman Catholic Primary School
- Willowbrook Primary School
- Trowbridge Primary School

Whitchurch

- Whitchurch High School
- Eglwys Newydd Primary School
- Eglwys Wen Primary School
- Ysgol Gymraeg Melin Gruffydd

== Parks ==
- Adamsdown community gardens
- Africa Gardens
- Bute Park
- Caedelyn Park
- Cathays Park
- Cefn Onn Country Park
- Coopers Field
- Despenser Gardens (Riverside)
- Fairwater Park
- Forest Farm Country Park (Whitchurch)
- Gorsedd Gardens
- Grange Gardens
- Grangemoor Park
- Hamadryad Park
- Hailey Park (Llandaff North)
- Heath Park
- Hill Snook Park
- Insole Court
- Llandaff Fields
- Llanishen Park
- Maitland Park
- Nant Fawr Corridor
- Pontcanna Fields
- Plasnewydd Gardens
- Roath Park
- Sanatorium Park
- Sevenoaks Park (Grangetown)
- Sophia Gardens
- Splott Park
- St John's Gardens
- Thompson's Park
- Trelai Park (the former Ely Racecourse)
- Tremorfa Park
- Victoria Park
- Waterloo Gardens
- Wern Goch Park
- Whitchurch Common

== Archaeological sites ==
- Cardiff Castle
- Castell Coch
- Morganstown Castle Mound
- Twmpath Castle
- The Priory (Bute park)
- The Friary (foundations removed to build the Capital Tower)

== Retail parks ==
- Wenvoe Retail Park, Culverhouse Cross
- Valegate Retail Park, Culverhouse Cross
- Brooklands Retail Park, Culverhouse Cross
- Cardiff Lifestyle Shopping Park, Llanishen
- Capital Retail Park, Leckwith
- Cardiff Bay Retail Park, Cardiff Bay.
- Dragon Retail Park, Newport Road
- Dunleavy Drive Retail Park, Dunleavy Drive
- The Avenue Retail Park, Newport Road
- Seager Retail Park, Newport Road
- Newport Road Retail Park, Newport Road
- City Link Retail Park, Newport Road
- Cardiff Gate Retail Park, Pontprennau
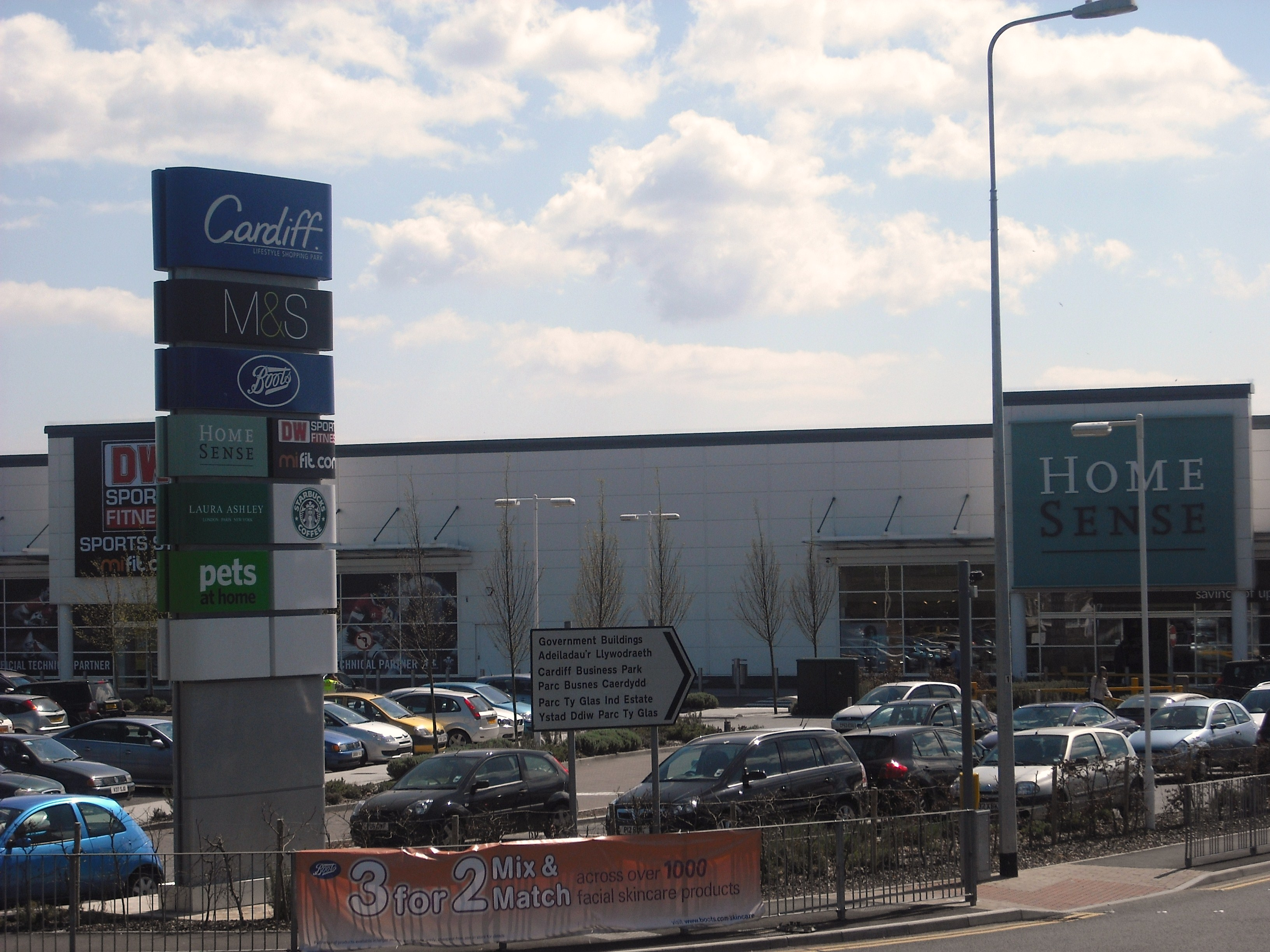
Cardiff Lifestyle Shopping Park, Llanishen

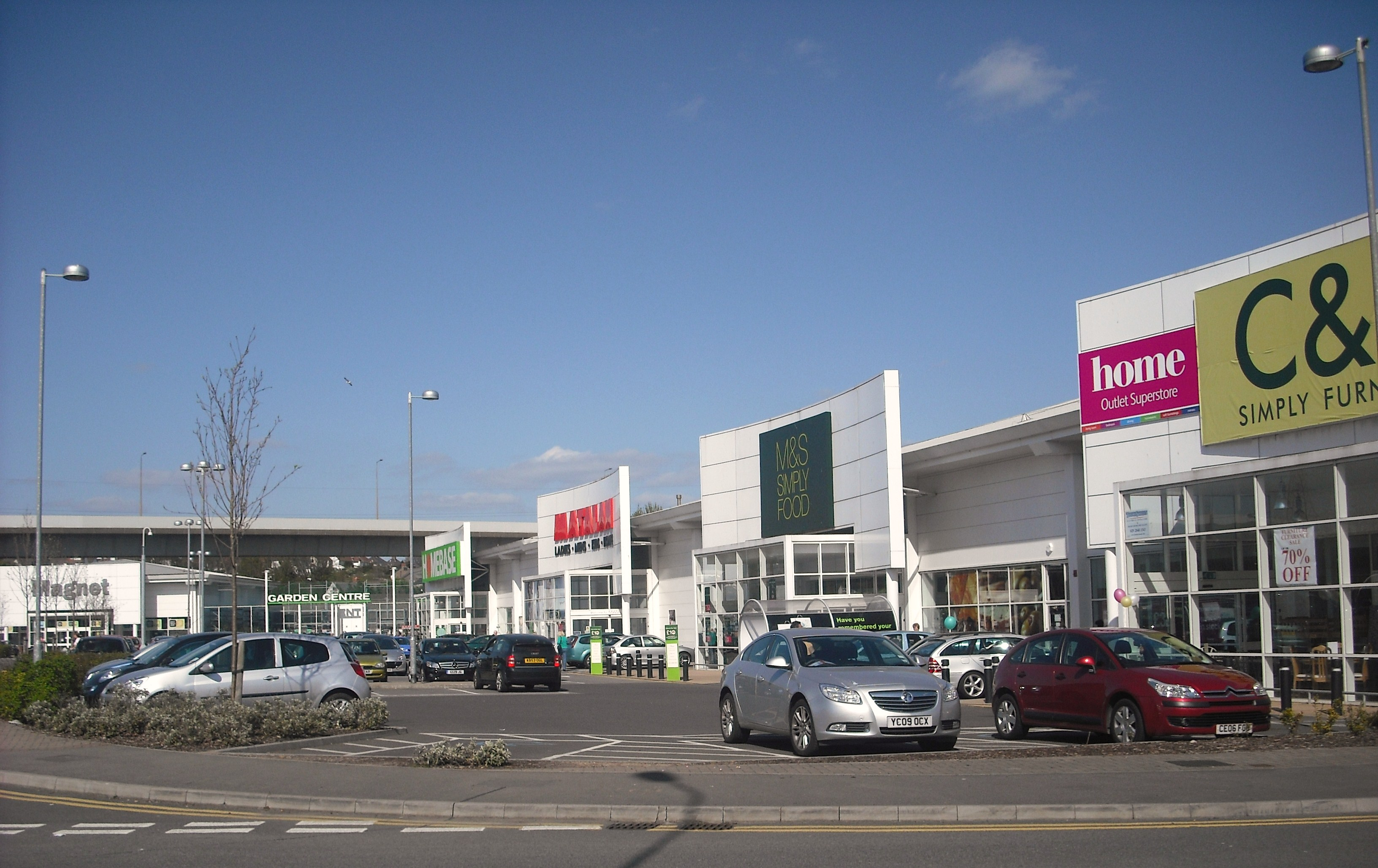
The Avenue Retail Park, Rumney

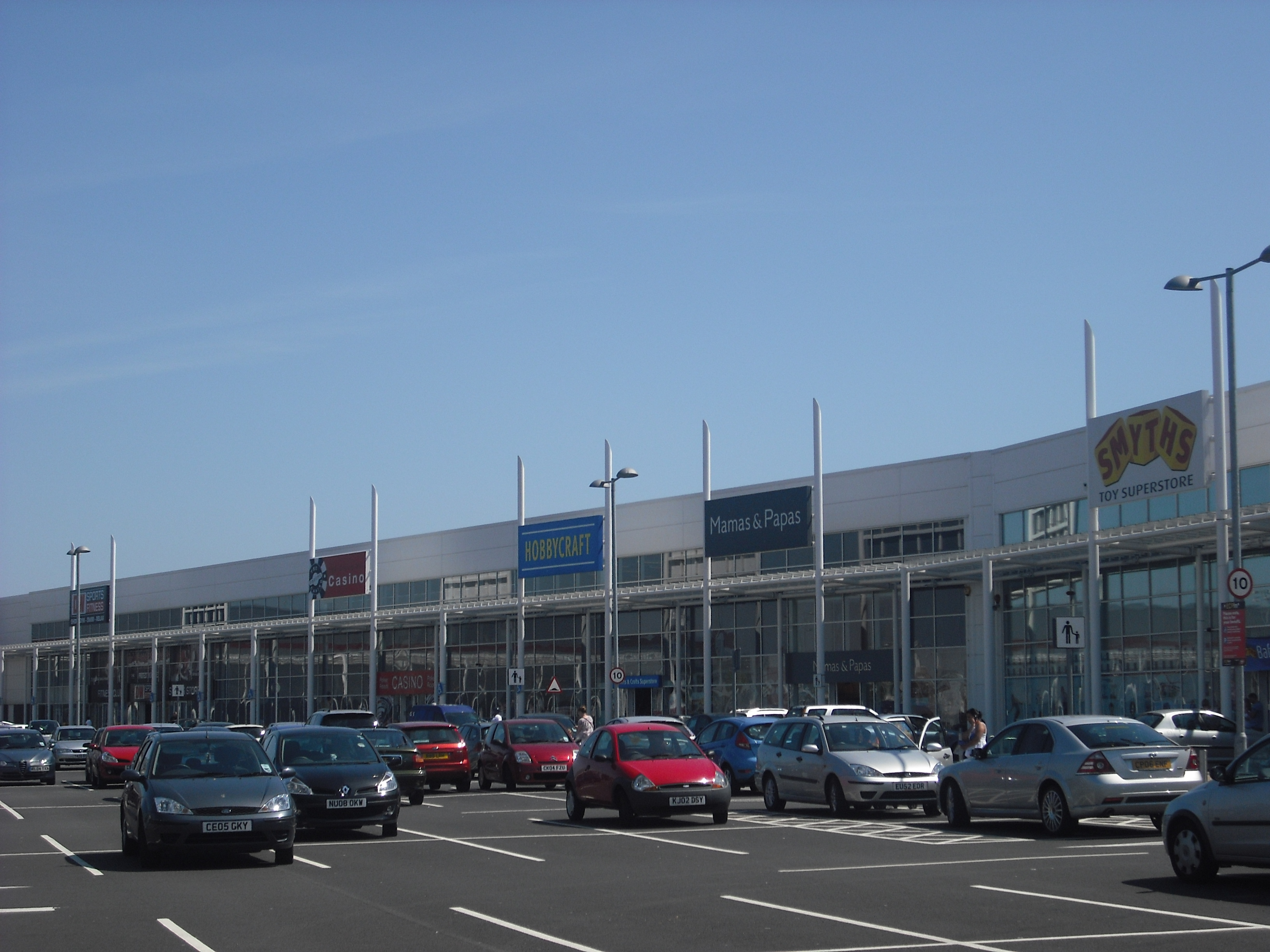
Capital Retail Park, Leckwith

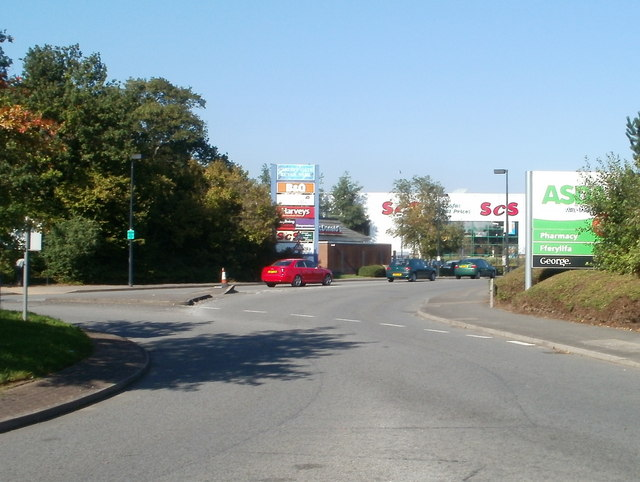
Cardiff Gate Retail Park

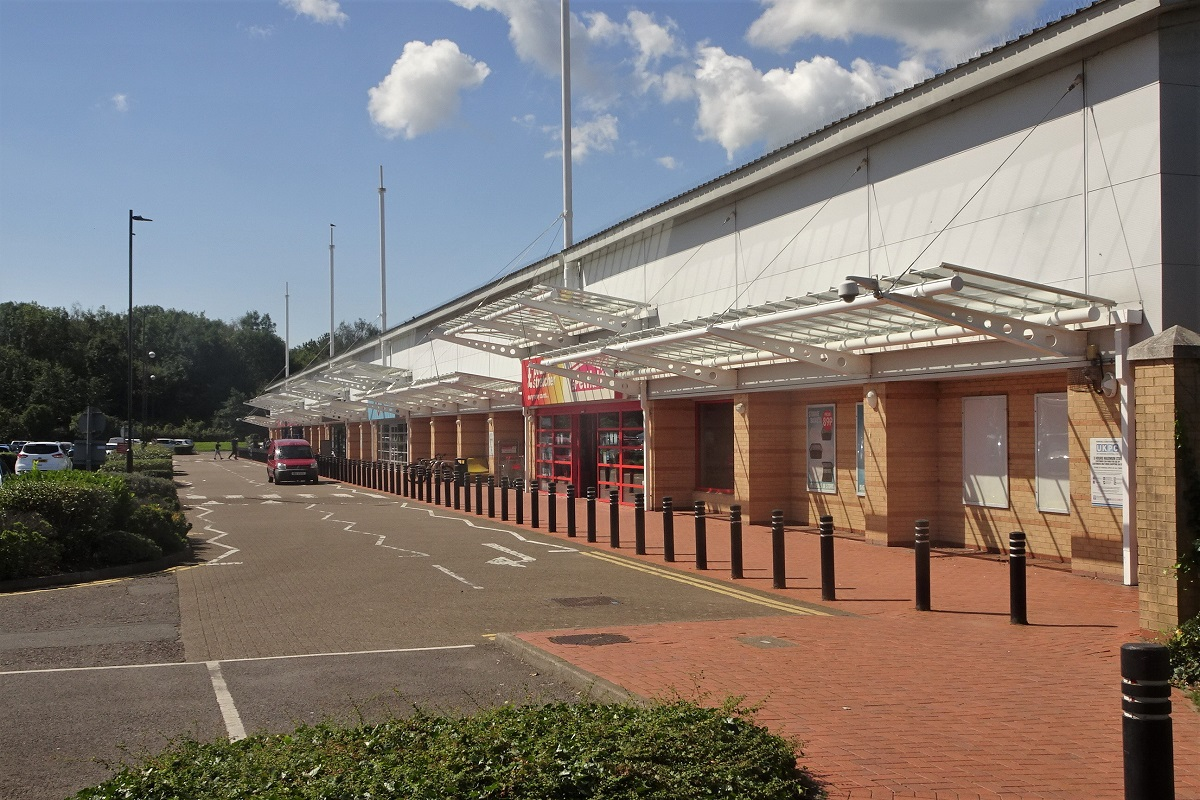
Cardiff Bay Retail Park

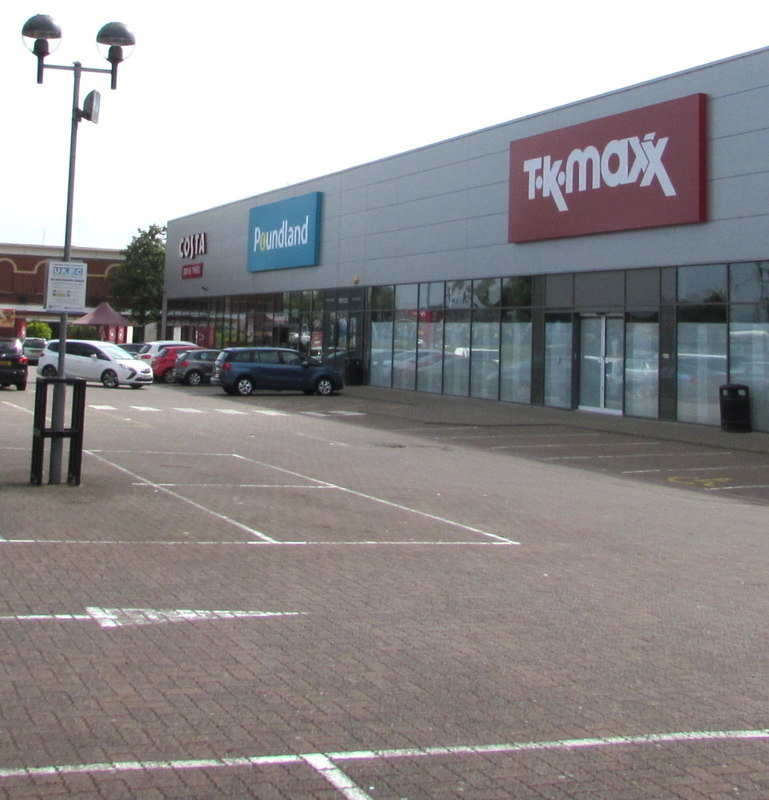
City Link Retail Park

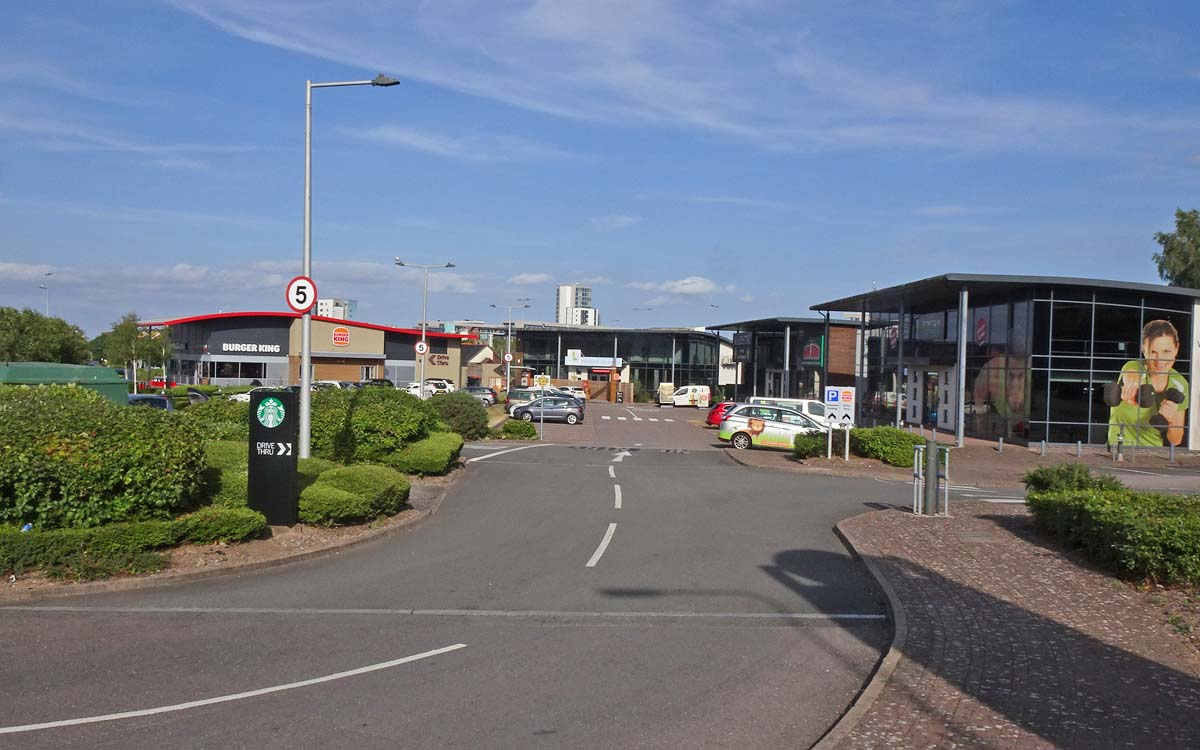
Dunleavy Drive Retail Park

== Transport ==
=== Public transport hubs ===
- Cardiff Central railway station
- Cardiff Queen Street railway station
- Radyr railway station
- Cardiff Bus Interchange
- Cardiff Coach Station, Sophia Gardens

=== Major roads ===
- A4055 road
- A4232 road
- A470 road
- A48 road
- A4161 road
- A48(M) motorway
- Cowbridge Road East/West
- M4 motorway
- Newport Road

=== Railway lines ===
- South Wales Main Line
- Valley Lines
- Maesteg Line
- Vale Line
- City Line
- Rhondda Line
- Merthyr Line
- Coryton Line
- Rhymney Line
- Butetown Branch

=== Railway stations ===
- Birchgrove
- Bay
- Central
- Queen Street
- Cathays
- Coryton
- Danescourt
- Fairwater
- Grangetown
- Heath High Level
- Heath Low Level
- Lisvane and Thornhill
- Llandaf
- Llanishen
- Ninian Park (for Cardiff City FC)
- Radyr
- Rhiwbina
- Ty Glas
- Waun-Gron Park
- Whitchurch

=== Cycle routes ===
- Taff Trail
- Ely Trail
- Rhymney Trail
- Lôn Las Cymru (National Cycle Network: Route 8)
- National Cycle Network: Route 88

=== Walking routes ===
- Cardiff Centenary Walk

=== Bridges ===
- A4055 Bridge (River Ely)
- A48 Bridge (River Taff)
- Blackweir footbridge
- Brains Bridge (railway, Grangetown)
- Cable Bridge (foot, Roath Basin)
- Cardiff Bridge (River Taff) - also known as Canton Bridge
- Cardiff Intersection Bridge (railway, Valley Lines crosses over the South Wales Main Line
- Clarence Bridge (River Taff)
- Crwys Road Bridge (Over Railway, Cathays)
- Ely Bridge
- Fairoak Road Bridge (Under Railway, Cathays)
- Leckwith Bridges (River Ely), a medieval bridge and its 20th century replacement
- Llandaff Bridge (River Taff)
- Lowther Road Bridge (railway)
- Millennium Footbridge (River Taff)
- Monthermer Road (Over Railway, Cathays)
- M4 bridge (River Taff)
- Penarth Road Bridge (River Taff)
- Pont y Werin (foot/cycle, River Ely)
- Rumney River bridge (road)
- A4232 Taff Viaduct (River Taff)
- Three Arches Railway Bridge (railway, Heath)
- Virgil Street bridge (railway, Grangetown)
- Windsor Road Bridge (railway, Adamsdown)

=== Shipping ===
- Cardiff Bay (leisure boats and local ferries)
- Penarth Marina

=== Airports ===
- Cardiff Heliport

(Cardiff International Airport and the military base RAF St Athan are both located in the neighbouring Vale of Glamorgan)

== See also ==
- List of cultural venues in Cardiff
- List of places in Wales
- List of standardised Welsh place-names in Cardiff
