= List of schools in Cardiff =

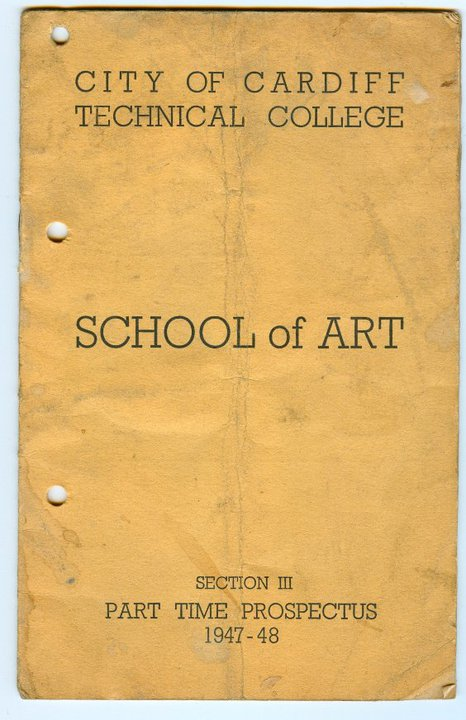
Cover of the 1947 CSAD Prospectus

This is a list of schools in Cardiff in Wales. It includes state schools, independent schools and further education colleges that provide sixth form education.

CW is an abbreviation for Church in Wales and RC for Roman Catholic.

== State English-medium primary schools ==
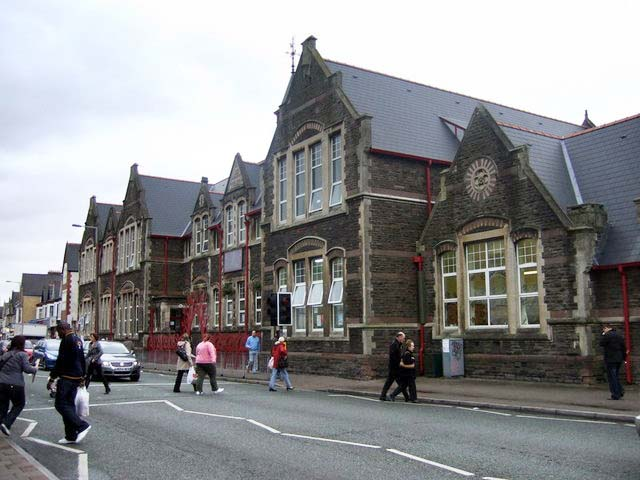
Albany Road Primary School, Roath

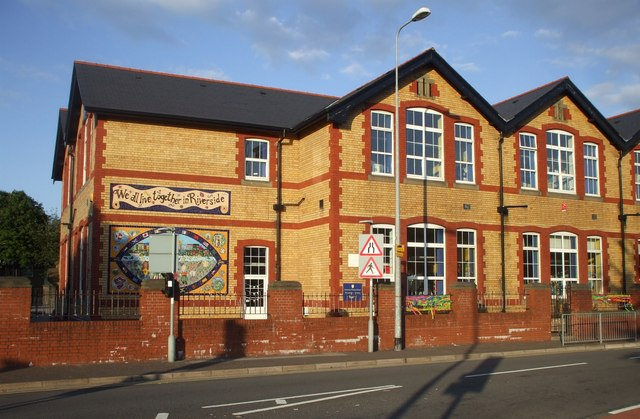
Kitchener Road Primary School, Riverside

- Adamsdown Primary School
- Albany Primary School
- All Saints CW Primary School
- Allensbank Primary School
- Baden Powell Primary School
- Birchgrove Primary School
- Bishop Childs CW Primary School
- Bryn Celyn Primary School
- Bryn Deri Primary School
- Bryn Hafod Primary School
- Christ The King RC Primary School
- Coed Glas Primary School
- Coryton Primary School
- Danescourt Primary School
- Fairwater Primary School
- Gabalfa Primary School
- Gladstone Primary School
- Glan-Yr-Afon Primary School
- Glyncoed Primary School
- Grangetown Primary School
- Greenway Primary School
- Hawthorn Primary School
- Herbert Thompson Primary School
- Holy Family RC Primary School
- Howardian Primary School
- Hywel Dda Primary School
- Kitchener Primary School
- Lakeside Primary School
- Lansdowne Primary School
- Llandaff CW Primary School
- Llanedeyrn Primary School
- Llanishen Fach Primary School
- Llysfaen Primary School
- Marlborough Primary School (formerly known as Marlborough Junior and Infants School until 2011)
- Meadowlane Primary School
- Millbank Primary School
- Moorland Primary School
- Mount Stuart Primary School
- Ninian Park Primary School
- Oakfield Primary School
- Pen-Y-Bryn Primary School
- Pencaerau Primary School
- Pentrebane Primary School
- Pentyrch Primary School
- Peter Lea Primary School
- Pontprennau Primary School
- Radnor Primary School
- Radyr Primary School
- Rhiwbina Primary School
- Rhydypenau Primary School
- Roath Park Primary School
- Rumney Primary School
- Severn Primary School
- Springwood Primary School
- St Alban's RC Primary School
- St Bernadette's RC Primary School
- St Cadoc's RC Primary School
- St Cuthbert's RC Primary School
- St David's CW Primary School
- St Fagan's CW Primary School
- St Francis RC Primary School
- St John Lloyd RC Primary School
- St Joseph's RC Primary School
- St Mary The Virgin CW Primary School
- St Mary's RC Primary School
- St Mellons CW Primary School
- St Monica's CW Primary School
- St Patrick's RC Primary School
- St Paul's CW Primary School
- St Peter's RC Primary School
- St Philip Evans RC Primary School
- Stacey Primary School
- Thornhill Primary School
- Ton-Yr-Ywen Primary School
- Tongwynlais Primary School
- Tredegarville C.W Primary School
- Trelai Primary School
- Trowbridge Primary School
- Whitchurch Primary School
- Willowbrook Primary School
- Windsor Clive Primary School

== State Welsh-medium primary schools ==
- Ysgol Bro Eirwg
- Ysgol Glan Ceubal
- Ysgol Glan Morfa
- Ysgol Gymraeg Coed-Y-Gof
- Ysgol Gymraeg Melin Gruffydd
- Ysgol Gymraeg Nant Caerau
- Ysgol Gymraeg Pwll Coch
- Ysgol Gymraeg Treganna
- Ysgol Gynradd Gymraeg Hamadryad
- Ysgol Gynradd Gymraeg Pen-y-Groes
- Ysgol Mynydd Bychan
- Ysgol Pen Y Pil
- Ysgol Pencae
- Ysgol Y Berllan Deg
- Ysgol-Y-Wern

== State dual-stream (English and Welsh) primary schools ==
- Creigiau Primary School
- Ysgol Gynradd Groes-Wen Primary School
- Ysgol Gynradd Gwaelod Y Garth Primary School

== State English-medium secondary schools ==
- Bishop of Llandaff CW High School
- Cantonian High School
- Cardiff High School
- Cardiff West Community High School
- Cathays High School
- Corpus Christi RC High School* (does not have a sixth form)
- Eastern High* (does not have a sixth form)
- Fitzalan High School
- Llanishen High School
- Mary Immaculate High School* (does not have a sixth form)
- Radyr Comprehensive School
- St Illtyd's Catholic High School*(does not have a sixth form)
- St Teilo's CW High School*
- Whitchurch High School
- Willows High School (does not have a Sixth Form)

== State Welsh-medium secondary schools ==
- Ysgol Gyfun Gymraeg Bro Edern, Penylan
- Ysgol Gyfun Gymraeg Glantaf, Llandaff North
- Ysgol Gyfun Gymraeg Plasmawr, Fairwater

== Independent schools ==
- Cardiff Steiner School, Llandaff North
- Cardiff Muslim Primary School, Cathays
- Howell's School
- Kings Monkton School
- Llandaff Cathedral School
- St John's College
- Cardiff Sixth Form College, Newport Road

== State special schools ==
- Ty Gwyn Special School
- Riverbank School
- Meadowbank School
- The Hollies School
- The Court School
- Woodlands High School
- Greenhill School

== Independent special schools ==
- Ty Coryton School
- Craig y Parc School
- Red Rose School

== Further and higher education establishments ==
- Cardiff and Vale College
- Royal Welsh College of Music & Drama
- St David's Catholic College
- Cardiff Metropolitan University
- Cardiff University
- University of South Wales

== Defunct schools and colleges ==
- Howardian High School – a secondary school originating in 1885, closed in 1990
- Llanrumney High School – closed in 2013 and merged with Rumney High School to create Eastern High School
- Llanedeyrn High School – closed in 2014 and its pupils dispersed to Llanishen High School or Cardiff High School
- Glyn Derw High School - closed in 2017 to make way for Cardiff West Community High School
- Michaelstone Community College - also closed in 2017 to make way for Cardiff West Community High School
- Taibah School
- St. Michael's College, Llandaff
