= Pwll-coch =

Area and former hamlet of Cardiff, Wales

Coordinates: 51°29′02″N 3°13′26″W

Pwll-coch is an area part of the district of Canton in Cardiff, Wales. It was formerly a separate hamlet in the parish of Llandaff near Cardiff. It was located on the junction of Windway Road and the main road from Cardiff to Ely (the modern A4161 at Cowbridge Road East), a short distance from Ely Bridge.

== Name ==
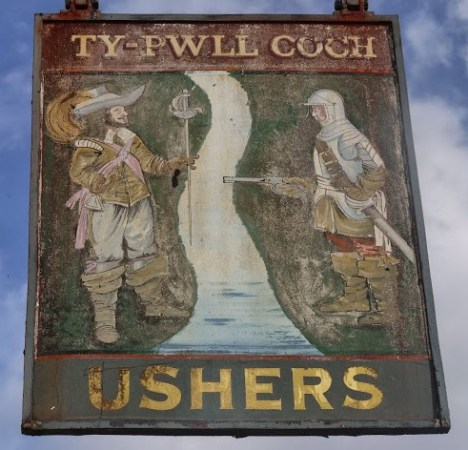
Tŷ Pwll Coch public house sign

The name is from the Welsh 'pwll coch' which means 'red pool'. The 'Pwll Coch' was originally a pool in the river Ely that supposedly filled with blood following the Battle of St Fagans in 1648. Due to straightening of the river's course (the 'new cut') the pool no longer exists. Ysgol Gymraeg Pwll Coch, a Welsh-medium primary school in the nearby Leckwith district of Canton, is also named after the pool.

== History ==
Until the late nineteenth century, Pwll-coch was part of the township of Ely. It was located on the western edge of Ely Common (formerly Llandaff Common), which roughly corresponds to the modern Victoria Park area of Canton. Pwll-coch was included in Canton when the latter was incorporated into Cardiff in 1875. The rest of Ely was not included within the city boundary until 1922.

== People, commerce and industry ==
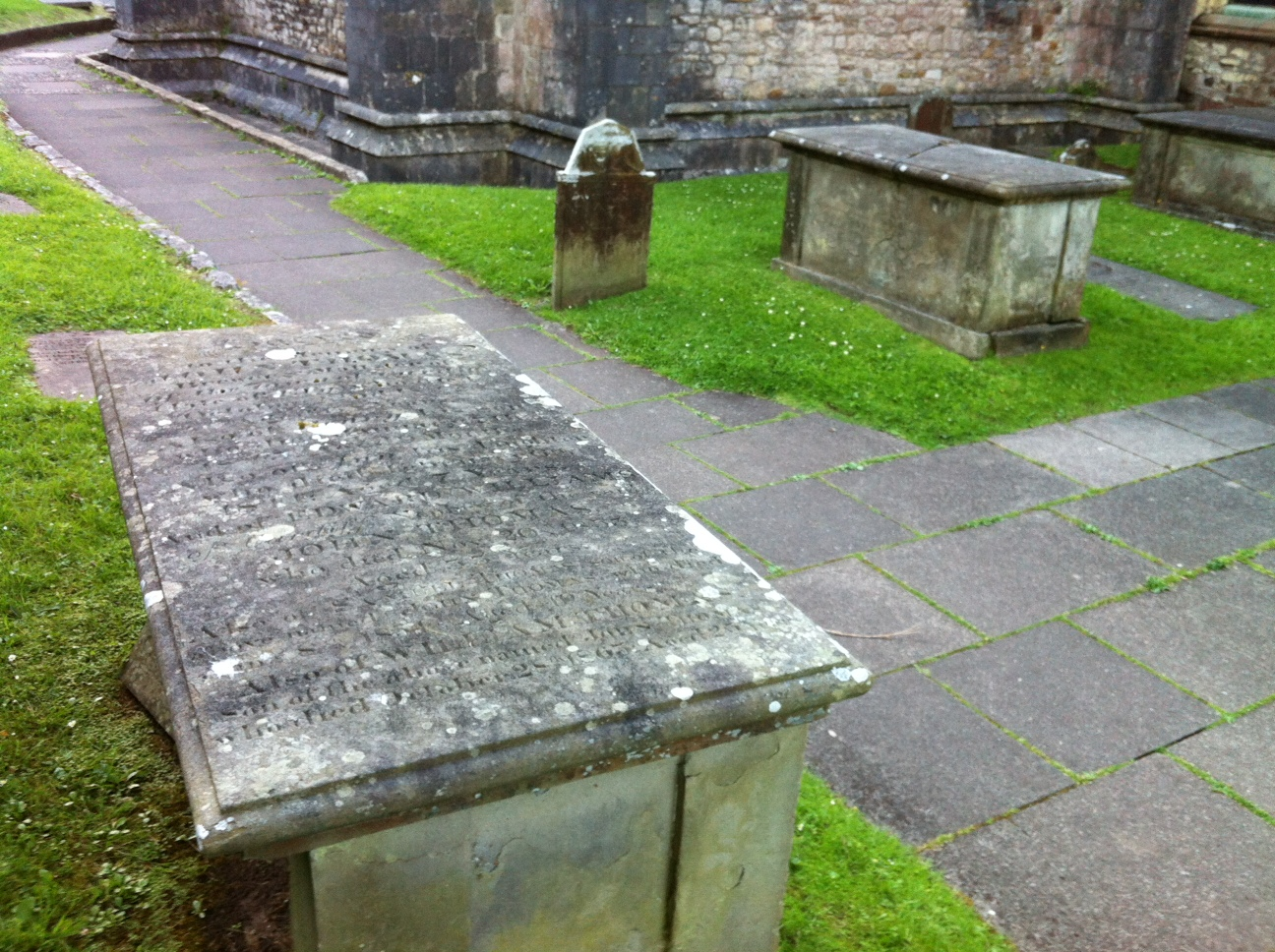
Chest tombs of Thomas and Jonas families at Llandaff

Until the middle of the nineteenth century, Pwll-coch consisted in the main of a farm, a public house (Tŷ Pwll Coch, which closed in 2012) and some cottages. There was also a workshop used by the Jonas family of Pwll-coch, who were well known as carpenters and wheelwrights. Elizabeth Jonas (1806–1865) was a noted businesswoman and supporter of Methodism in Ely and Cardiff. She married John Thomas (1804–1842), a brewer from across the river in Ely. After his early death she continued to operate the Castle Brewery in Cardiff for over twenty years (it was later taken over by Hancocks Brewery). She was a generous donor to the Welsh-speaking Methodist chapels in Ely and Cardiff. Elizabeth is buried with her husband and children at Llandaff Cathedral; the Jonas family tomb is close by.

In 1865 a paper mill opened on land between the old Pwll Coch pool on the river Ely and the hamlet of Pwll-coch. Located between the river and the South Wales Railway, the Ely Paper Company was liquidated in 1875 and taken over by Samuel Evans and Thomas Owen (uncle and half-brother of Liverpool businessman Owen Owen). Following Evans' death the company was reformed as Thomas Owen & Co. Paper manufacturing continued at the site until 2000. A large housing estate is currently being built on the old mill site.

During the 1870s Stephen Treseder (1834–1909) opened a nursery at Pwll-coch. Originally known as the Ely Road Nursery, it was later called Pwll Coch Nurseries. The nursery supplied plants for many local estates, including that of the Bute family at Cardiff Castle. The nursery also gave its name to the Pwll Coch Dahlia.
