= James Pyke Thompson =

British philanthropist

James Pyke Thompson (1846–1897) was a British corn merchant who is best known for his philanthropic work towards the people of Cardiff and Penarth in South Wales. Born into a wealthy family in Bridgwater, Somerset, Thompson joined his father as director of Spiller & Co., Cardiff, one of the largest milling companies in Britain.

Thompson was an art collector and was a particular admirer of British watercolours. To allow the public to view his collection, he built the Turner House Gallery, named after artist Joseph Turner, in Penarth in 1887. It opened to the public in 1888. He also gave thousands of pounds to both Cardiff's Municipal Museum and National Museum. The Thompson family carried on his philanthropic work after his death and the Turner House gallery was donated to the National Museum in 1921. In 1924 the land surrounding the family house in Canton, Cardiff was also presented to the city; it was renamed Thompson's Park.

== Bibliography ==
- Davies, John; Jenkins, Nigel (2008). The Welsh Academy Encyclopaedia of Wales. Cardiff: University of Wales Press. ISBN 978-0-7083-1953-6.
