= Sanatorium Park =

Public park in Cardiff, Wales

Coordinates: 51.478°N 3.218°W

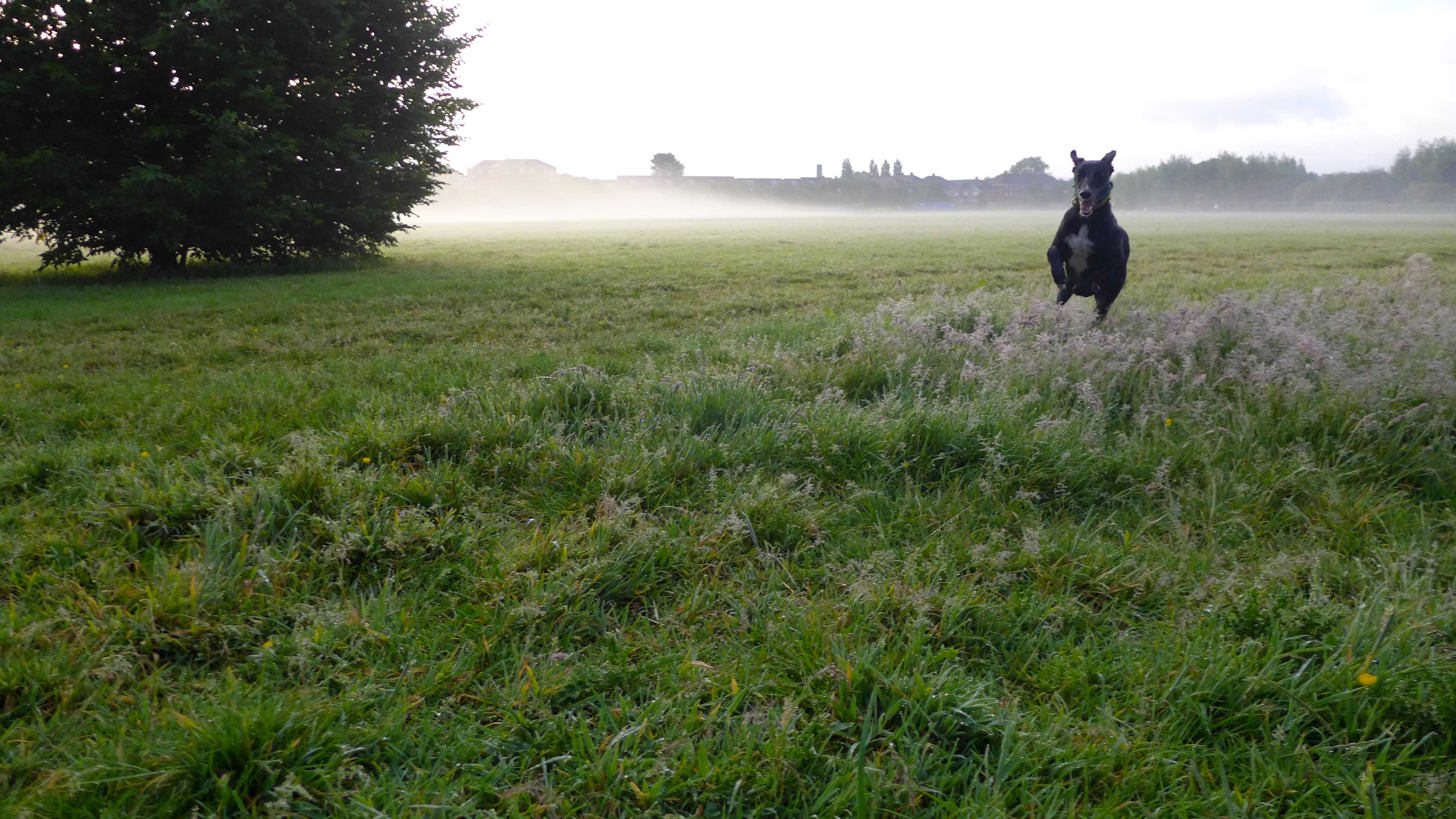
Sanatorium Park includes open areas that are used for exercise

Sanatorium Park (Welsh: Parc Sanatorium) is a public park in the Canton district of western Cardiff, Wales. It includes open green space, wildflower hedgerows, two play areas, and a football goal with a half basketball court.

== Description ==
The entrances to the park are from Treganna Street and Lawrenny Avenue, and from the Ely Trail footpath that runs through the park. The River Ely runs along the western side of the park; Trelai Park (the site of former Ely Racecourse) is on the other side of the river, but there is no pedestrian bridge between the parks. The Grangetown Viaduct carries the A4232 road over the southern edge of the park. Ysgol Gymraeg Treganna, a Welsh-medium primary school, is on the northern edge of the park.

== History ==
Lansdowne Hospital was located to the northeast of the park; the buildings have been demolished and the site is now used for housing.

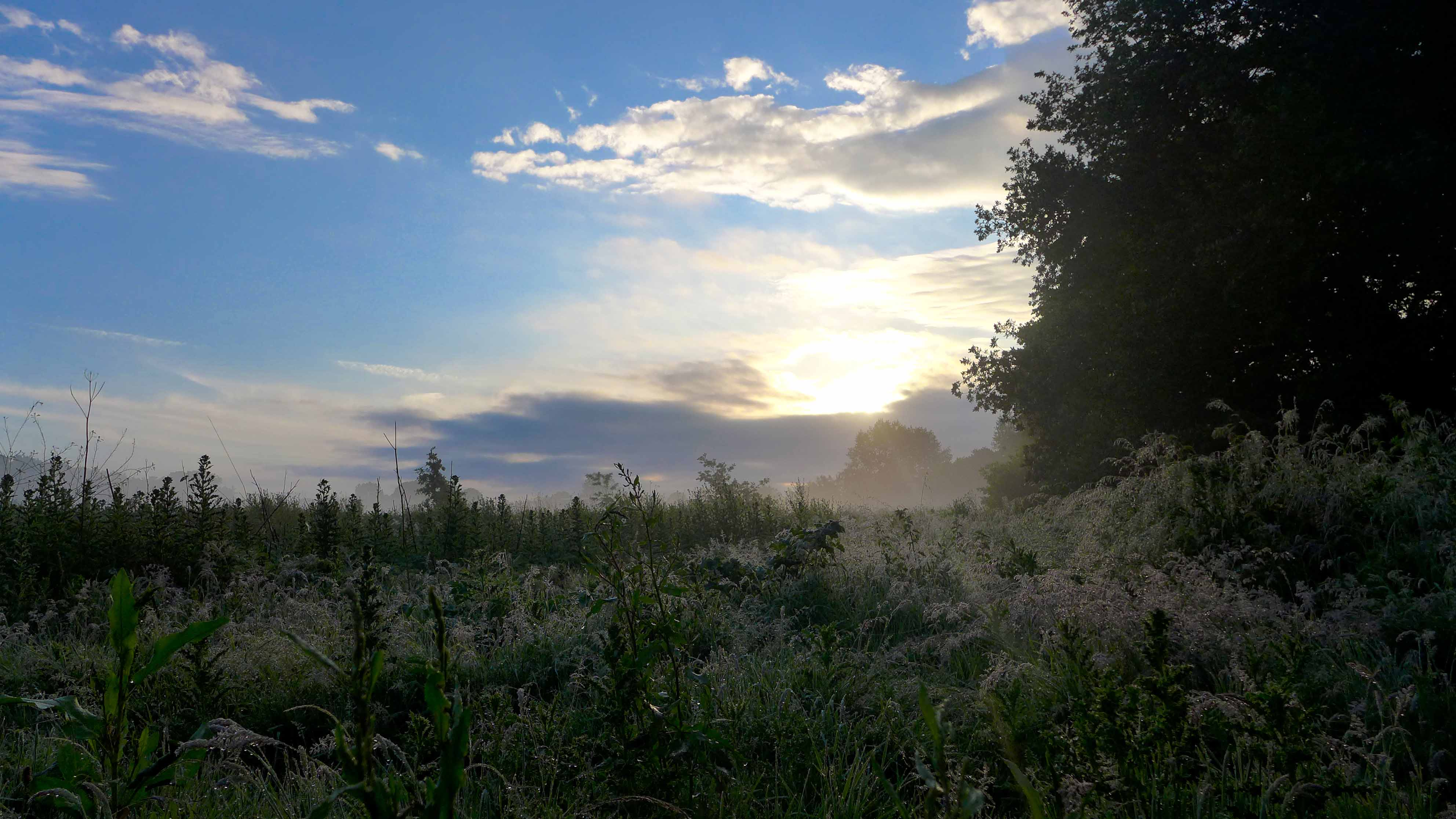
Sanatorium Park at sunrise in June 2020

Sanatorium Park adjoins of the site of the former Ely Paper Works, latterly known as the Arjo Wiggins Teape Paper Mill, which opened in 1865 and closed in 2000. Samuel Evans and Thomas Owen took over the works in 1877, and by 1889 the works was producing between 145 and 150 tons of paper per week. After the works closed, the site was cleared in preparation for redevelopment. Work started on a new housing development of the 53-hectare site in 2015, named The Mill.

Canton Brickworks adjoined the park and was situated at the end of Sanitorium Road. It is shown on maps published between 1898 and 1938, but by 1947 it had been demolished.

== Controversy ==
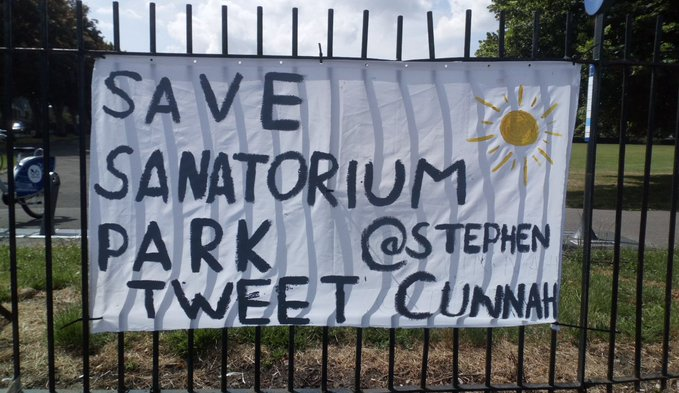
Protest sign, June 2020

In April 2020, Cardiff City Council started construction of a football pitch in the east of the park, near to the children's play area; the pitch was to be enclosed in a 3-metre (10 ft) high fence. There was opposition from local residents who had been unaware of the plans, and in May 2020 work was suspended pending further consultation.

In early June 2020, residents were informed that work was about to resume. The pitch was now to be in a different area of the park, and the work would have restricted access to areas of the park which was then being extensively used due to the COVID-19 pandemic restrictions then in force. The resumption of work was strongly opposed by local residents some of whom obstructed the construction workers. The renewed protests resulted in the council suspending work for a second time.

The development was eventually completed, and in December 2020, it was reported that the new football pitch regularly flooded after heavy rain, leaving it waterlogged and unplayable. The pitch is used by Fitzalan High School and by Ysgol Gymraeg Treganna, the local primary school.
