= Ysgol Gymraeg Pwll Coch =

Coordinates: 51.475238°N 3.210872°W

Location
- Lawrenny Avenue; Cardiff, CF11 8BR; Wales

Information
- Type: Welsh-medium state school
- Motto: Teulu Mawr Ym Ni i Gyd ("We Are All One Big Family")
- Established: 1996
- Local authority: Cardiff Council
- Headteacher: Dewi Rees
- Gender: Both
- Age: 3 to 11
- Enrolment: 520 (in September 2019, including 64 part-time pupils in the nursery class)
- Houses: Cadair Idris, Epynt, Preseli, Yr Wyddfa
- Colour: Red
- Website: http://www.ygpc.cymru

Ysgol Gymraeg Pwll Coch is a large Welsh-medium primary school in the Canton area of western Cardiff, in Wales.

== General ==
Ysgol Gymraeg Pwll Coch is a Welsh-medium primary school which provides education for pupils from a wide and diverse area of west Cardiff, including Riverside and parts of Canton, Pontcanna and Victoria Park. There are 520 pupils between 3 and 11 years old on roll, including 64 part-time nursery age pupils. Pupils are divided into 18 single-age classes.

The school feeds Ysgol Gyfun Gymraeg Glantaf and Ysgol Gyfun Gymraeg Plasmawr Welsh-medium secondary schools.

Welsh is the main medium of the school's life and work, although in 2019 only 10% of the pupils came from Welsh-speaking homes. About 25% of pupils came from ethnic minority backgrounds.

The name "Pwll Coch" means "red pool"' in Welsh, and refers to a pool in the River Ely and a hamlet which grew nearby, close to the modern Tŷ Pwll Coch public house. Tradition states that the pool filled with blood following the Battle of St Fagans in 1648. The area is no longer part of the school's catchment area.

The Estyn inspection report on the school in 2018 and 2024 classified the school as good in all five areas that were inspected. It commented that "The staff create a happy, caring and inclusive ethos at the school, where everyone is respected and appreciated ... The quality of teaching is good ... most pupils make sound progress, achieve well and use their skills to a high standard by the end of key stage 2 ... Leaders are extremely effective ... Standards of behaviour are consistently high."

== History ==
Ysgol Gymraeg Pwll Coch was founded in 1996, co-located with Fitzalan High School. In September 1999, the school moved to a new building on land opposite Fitzalan High on Lawrenny Avenue, which was the first purpose-built Welsh-medium school in Cardiff.

By September 2000, due to the school's popularity, the number of pupils had increased significantly, with two classes per year group (two-form entry). To house the larger numbers, temporary accommodation was erected on the school grounds. In 2006, a significant extension of the junior department was built and the school operated two classes for all years by 2008.

By September 2011 the school had temporarily expanded further, with three-form entry for the years 2011, 2012 and 2013. In 2014 the intake reverted to two-form entry. There were over 520 pupils on roll in 2019.

In February 2019, a new Welsh-medium specialist resource base, Yr Hafan, was opened at the school for pupils with complex learning needs from across the city. Yr Hafan was officially opened by the First Minister of Wales, Mark Drakeford, on 22 November 2019.

In September 2020, Cylch Meithrin Pwll Coch opened on the school site providing Welsh-medium nursery sessions and wrap-around provision for the main school nursery classes. In June 2021 a new building was opened for Cylch Meithrin Pwll Coch, funded by the Welsh Government and Cardiff Council with support from Mudiad Meithrin.

=== Head teachers ===
- 1996: Anna Roberts
- 2009: Meinir Howells
- 2016: Christopher Newcombe
- 2022: Dewi Rees
