= Tenby Davies =

Welsh athlete

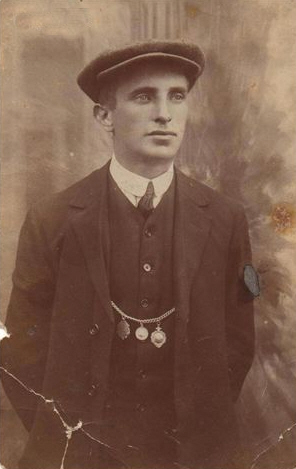
Tenby Davies.

Frederick Charles "Tenby" Davies (12 April 1884 – 23 July 1932) was a Welsh athlete who became the half-mile world professional champion in 1909 after a race against Irishman Beauchamp Day.

== Biography ==
Frederick Charles Davies was born at South Parade in Tenby, Pembrokeshire, Wales, the son of John Gwynne Davies (1854–1910), a stonemason and builder, and Sarah Phillips (1852–1935). Freddy Davies went on to achieve recognition as one of the greatest runners Wales has yet produced and was regarded as one of the finest half-milers ever seen, winning the World 880 yds championship at Pontypridd in 1909.

Fred Davies’ versatility as a world-class athlete is underlined by the fact that as well as excelling at the half-mile, he also won events throughout Britain at distances from 100 yds up to a mile. He was a regular competitor in the Welsh Powderhall 130 yds handicap sprints, organised by the Pontypridd Athletic Club and held at Taff Vale Park in the town during the early part of the twentieth-century. But ‘Tenby’ is probably best remembered for taking on his great rival, Irishman Beauchamp R. Day of Blackpool, at Pontypridd on Monday 23 August 1909 where he decisively beat him over the half-mile distance, clocking an impressive 1 min. 57.6 seconds in the process, which was one of the fastest times recorded in the World for that year.

In 1911 he married Agnes Emily Ferguson (1888–1945) at the parish church of St Mary the Virgin in Tenby, and in the years that followed the couple moved to Cardiff where they had three children. F. C. Davies died at his home of 9 Preswylfa Street in Canton, Cardiff, Glamorgan, aged only 48.

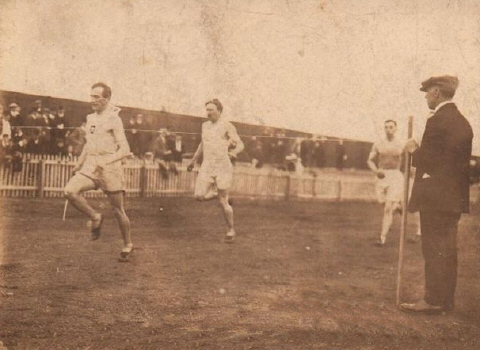
Fred Davies beating Bert Day. Photograph by kind permission of Richard Davies

== Bibliography ==
- Collins, John; Currie, Alan & Brenda; Walters, Mike & Williams, Clive (2002). The History of Welsh Athletics. Dragon Sports Books Ltd, Llanelli. ISBN 0-9524041-5-X
