= Phillip Wien =

Sir Phillip Solly Wien (7 August 1913 – 11 June 1981) was a British barrister and judge. He was a High Court judge, sitting in the Queen's Bench Division judge, from 1970 until his death in 1981.

Wien was educated at Canton High School, Cardiff and the University College of South Wales and Monmouthshire. He then studied at the University of London. Wien practiced as a solicitor between 1938 and 1946.

During the Second World War, Wien served as a major with the 22nd Dragoon Guards and was mentioned in despatches. He took part in war crimes trials, where his performance was noted and which led to him being encouraged to transfer to the English bar, which he did in 1946, being called by the Inner Temple. He became a Queen's Counsel in 1961.

He represented the National Coal Board at the tribunal into the Aberfan disaster. Despite his advice, the NCB refused to admit liability for an extended period of time.

He was Recorder of Birkenhead from 1965 until 1969. He was appointed Recorder of Swansea in 1969. He was appointed to the High Court in 1970 and was assigned to the Queen's Bench Division. He served on the bench until he died in 1981.

Wien was Jewish.
