= Thompson's Park =

Park in Cardiff, Wales

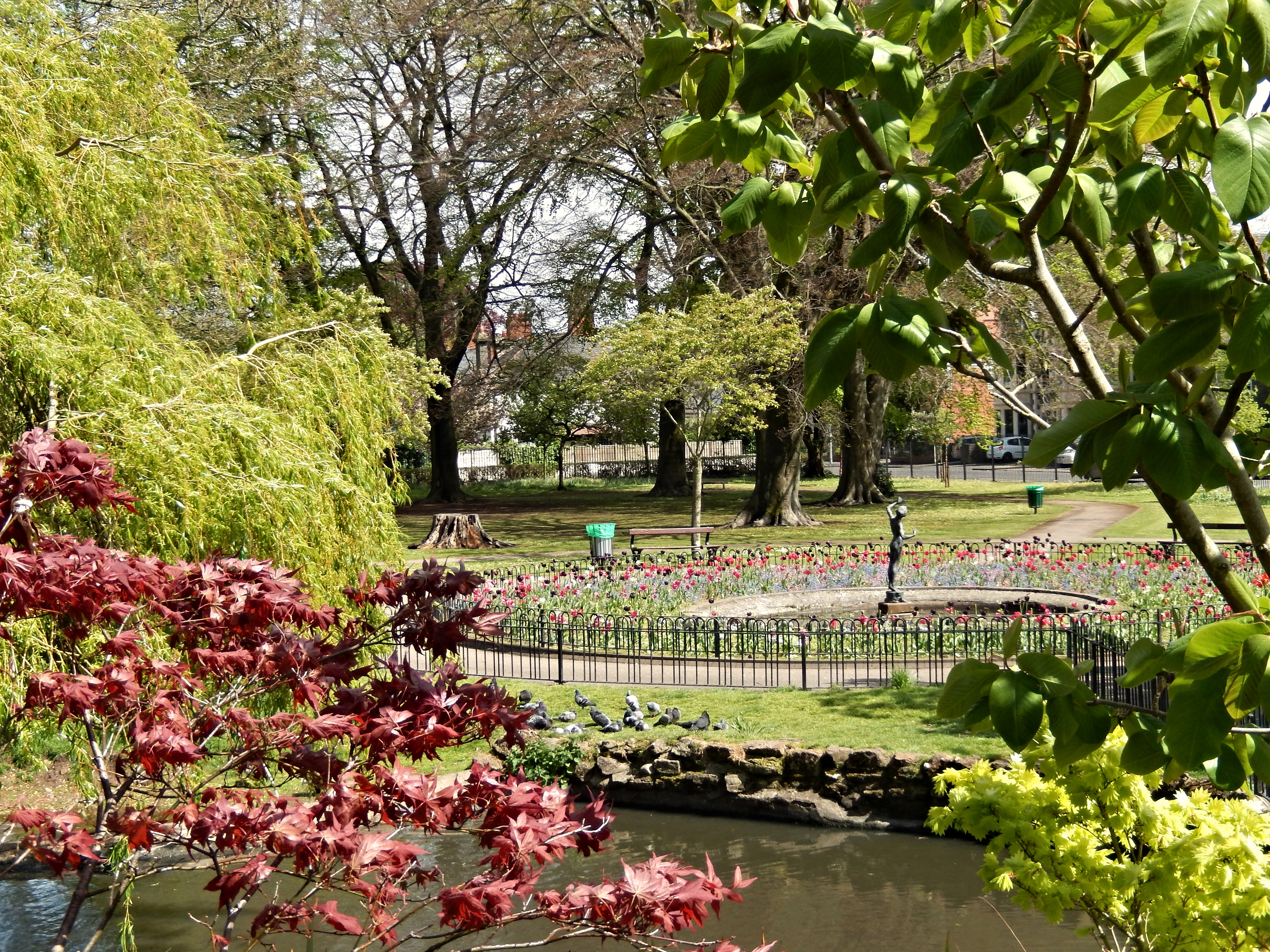
- Thompson's Park in 2015
- Interactive map of Thompson's Park
- Location: Syr Davids Avenue, Canton
- Nearest city: Cardiff
- Coordinates: 51.4861°N 3.2090°W
- Established: 1891
- Owner: Cardiff Council

Cadw/ICOMOS Register of Parks and Gardens of Special Historic Interest in Wales
- Official name: Thompson's Park (Sir David's Field)
- Designated: 1 February 2022; 4 years ago
- Reference no.: PGW(Gm)71(CDF)
- Listing: Grade II

Thompson's Park, originally known as Sir David’s Field, is a park in Cardiff, Wales, located in the Canton area. It is one of the city's oldest parks, featuring areas of woodland mixed with open grassed areas and ornamental planting. The park is named after the influential family of James Pyke Thompson who owned it before it was acquired by Cardiff Council who continue to own and maintain the park.

== Landscape ==
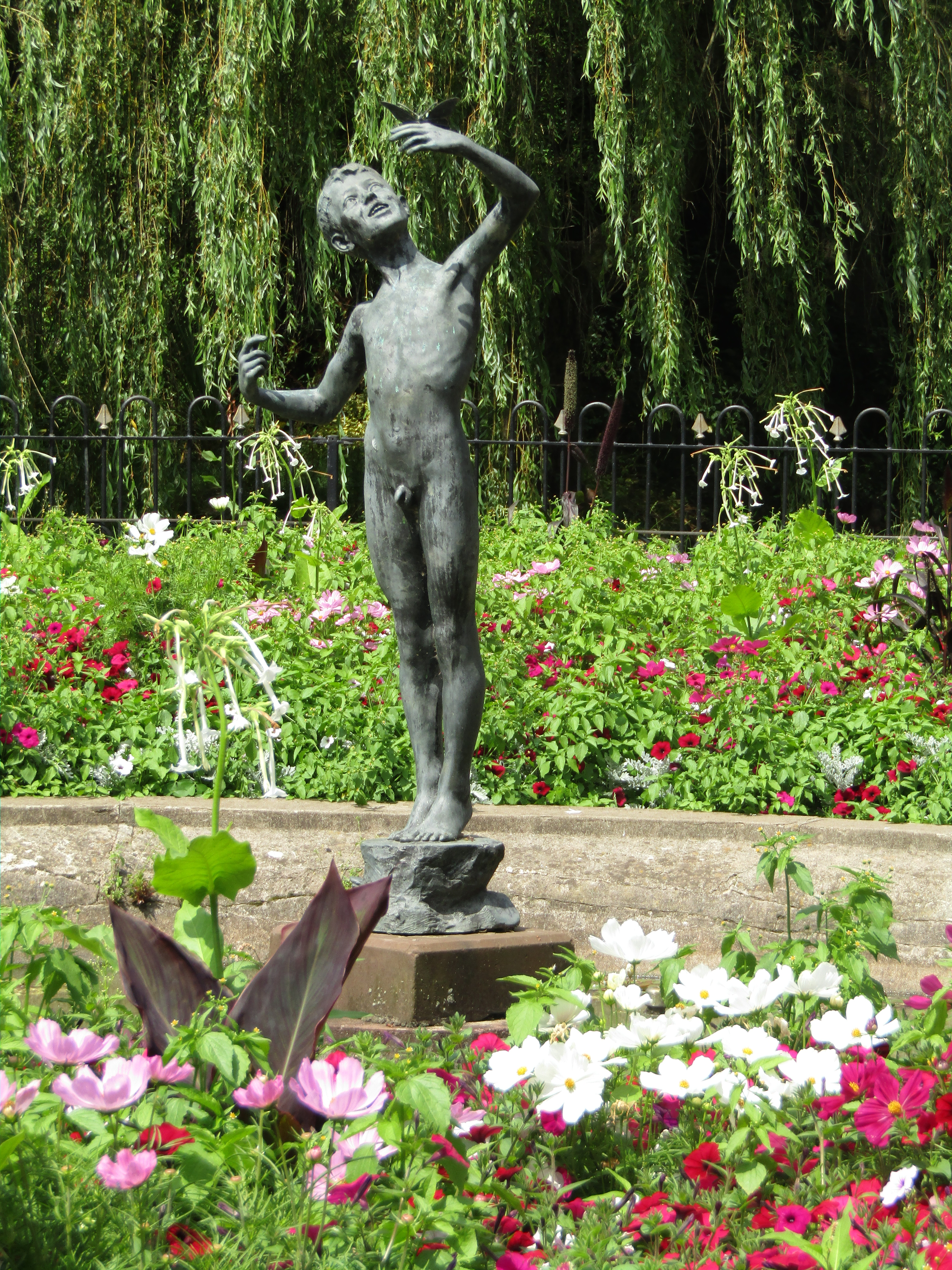
'Joyance' at Thompson's Park

Located on a hill, there is a large mixture of trees and shrubs in the park which is bordered by flowering plants. Woodland and pond areas are habitats for wildlife. Near the pond there are a number of ornamental planted areas with wild flower bulb areas. Thompson's Park no longer has a bowling green and pavilion, but has large open grassed areas and a surfaced network of paths. The park holds a giant tree carving of the 'green man' (cut down to a stump in the summer of 2013) and a bronze statue of 'Joyance', which forms the centrepiece of the fountain. and has many facilities.

== Location ==
Thompson's Park is located near the A4119 road in the Canton area of west Cardiff, close to the larger Victoria Park and Llandaff Fields. Cardiff Bus services stop at the northern and southern end of the park.

== In popular culture ==
The Boy Azooga track "Walking Thompson's Park" is named in reference to the park, as frontman Davey Newington hails from Cardiff. The park is also referenced in their track "Jerry".
