= Mel Rees =

Welsh footballer (1967–1993)

Personal information
- Full name: Melvyn John Rees
- Date of birth: 25 January 1967
- Place of birth: Cardiff, Wales
- Date of death: 30 May 1993 (aged 26)
- Place of death: Derby, England
- Height: 6 ft 2 in (1.88 m)
- Position: Goalkeeper

Senior career*
Years	Team	Apps	(Gls)
1984–1987	Cardiff City	31	(0)
1987–1990	Watford	3	(0)
1989	→ Crewe Alexandra (loan)	6	(0)
1989	→ Southampton (loan)	0	(0)
1990	→ Leyton Orient (loan)	9	(0)
1990–1992	West Bromwich Albion	18	(0)
1992	→ Norwich City (loan)	0	(0)
1992–1993	Sheffield United	8	(0)
Total		75	(0)
- * Club domestic league appearances and goals

Melvyn John Rees (25 January 1967 – 30 May 1993) was a Welsh professional footballer who made 75 appearances in the Football League as a goalkeeper before he died from cancer at the age of 26.

== Career ==
Rees was born in Cardiff, where he attended Fitzalan High School. During his time there, he was a member of the squad that was the first to take the English Schools' FA Cup out of England. He later joined his hometown club, Cardiff City, signing on a YTS scheme. He made his professional debut on 8 September 1984 in a 4–2 defeat to Brighton & Hove Albion. Rees did not make another league appearance for the club until the following year when he was on the receiving end of eight defeats in nine appearances during the 1985–86 season. A wrist injury kept him sidelined for nearly a year and, on his return, the presence of Graham Moseley meant he was sold to First Division club Watford for a fee of £60,000.

At Watford, Rees spent three years as understudy to Tony Coton, as well as spending time on loan at Crewe Alexandra, Southampton and Leyton Orient, before leaving to join West Bromwich Albion after David James was named as Watford's first-choice goalkeeper following the departure of Coton. In March 1992, Rees joined Sheffield United for a fee of £25,000 due to a goalkeeping crisis at the club, making his debut for the club in a 2–0 victory over Liverpool on 28 March 1992. He played in eight league games that season, helping them win five and draw two, which ensured their survival as they finished in a secure ninth place and confirmed their place in the new FA Premier League.

When he made his First Division debut for Watford, on 28 December 1987 at the age of 20 years, 337 days, Rees set a record for the youngest footballer to play in all four divisions of the English Football League.

== Illness and death ==
Rees was diagnosed with cancer of the bowel in the summer of 1992. He underwent surgery in August of that year and was believed to have overcome the disease shortly afterwards. However, by March 1993 it had returned and he underwent further surgery.

On 3 April 1993, Rees took a lap of honour prior to a FA Cup semi-final match between Sheffield United and their Steel City rivals Sheffield Wednesday after leading the two sides out. Former teammate Kevin Gage later recalled the moment, stating:

"Wembley was fantastic for him. Both sets of supporters, 80,000, stood and applauded him. Football paled in significance while he walked round. It was very brave."

Rees died at the end of the following month, aged 26.

== Legacy ==
The 'Mel Rees Tournament' is held every summer at the Sheffield United academy to raise money for St Luke's Hospice.
