= Glamorganshire Canal local nature reserve =

Nature reserve in Cardiff, Wales

Coordinates: 51.521°N 3.245°W

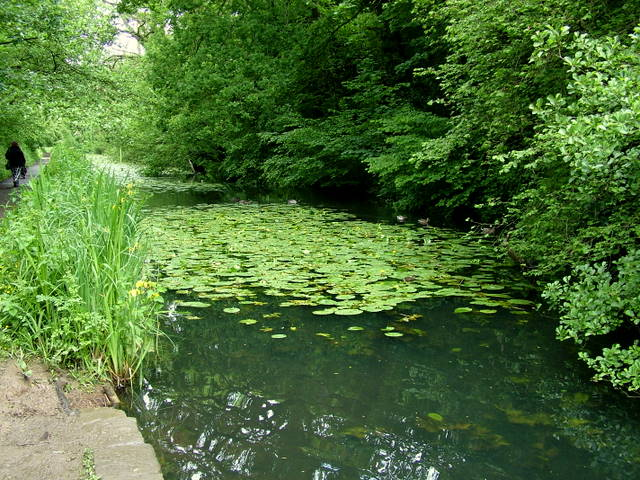
The Glamorganshire Canal in the nature reserve

The Glamorganshire Canal local nature reserve is a nature reserve in Whitchurch, Cardiff, Wales. Formed in 1967, it comprises a disused section of the Glamorganshire Canal (constructed 1794), the Long Wood (designated as a Site of Special Scientific Interest) and an area of the flood plain of the River Taff. The reserve is also known as Forest Farm, and the old farm buildings are used to support the reserve.

The water in the canal is relatively clean for an ex-industrial area, and supports several species of waterbirds, including kingfishers and grey herons. It is one of the few British nest sites of the Eurasian bittern. The Long Wood is chiefly oak and beech, with several trees over 200 years old.

In 1992 the reserve was included in the newly declared Forest Farm Country Park which covered approximately 150 acres (60 ha).

The reserve is supported by the Friends of Forest Farm, who organise educational events and support Cardiff Council in the protection and maintenance of the nature reserve.

== See also ==
- List of Sites of Special Scientific Interest in Mid & South Glamorgan
