= Canton, Cardiff =

District and community in Cardiff, Wales

Canton: Welsh: Treganna
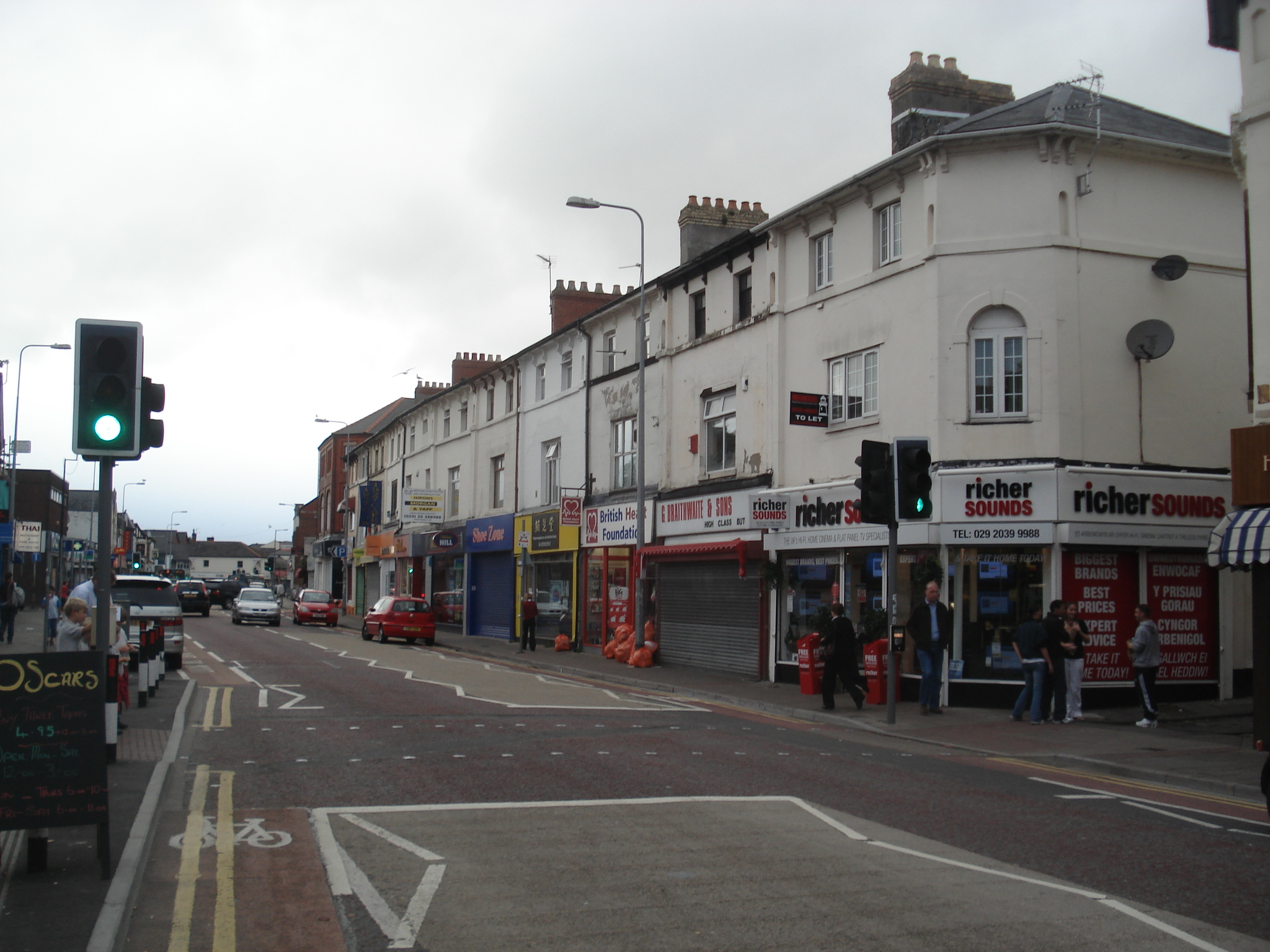
- Cowbridge Road East

- Location within Cardiff
- Population: 16,138 (2021)
- OS grid reference: ST164767
- Community: Canton
- Principal area: Cardiff
- Preserved county: Cardiff
- Country: Wales
- Sovereign state: United Kingdom
- Post town: CARDIFF
- Postcode district: CF5 and CF11
- Dialling code: 029
- Police: South Wales
- Fire: South Wales
- Ambulance: Welsh
- UK Parliament: Cardiff West
- Senedd Cymru – Welsh Parliament: Cardiff West
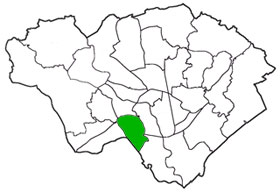
- List of places UK Wales Cardiff 51.48°N 3.21°W

Canton (Welsh: Treganna) is an inner-city district and community in the west of Cardiff, capital of Wales, lying 2 miles (3.2 km) west of the city's civic centre. It is located adjacent to Pontcanna. Canton is one of the most ethnically diverse of Cardiff's suburbs, with a significant Pakistani and Indian population. The total population of Canton increased to 16,138 at the 2021 census. It is also the most Welsh-speaking ward in Cardiff, with 24% of the population aged three years old and over being able to speak Welsh.

== Description ==
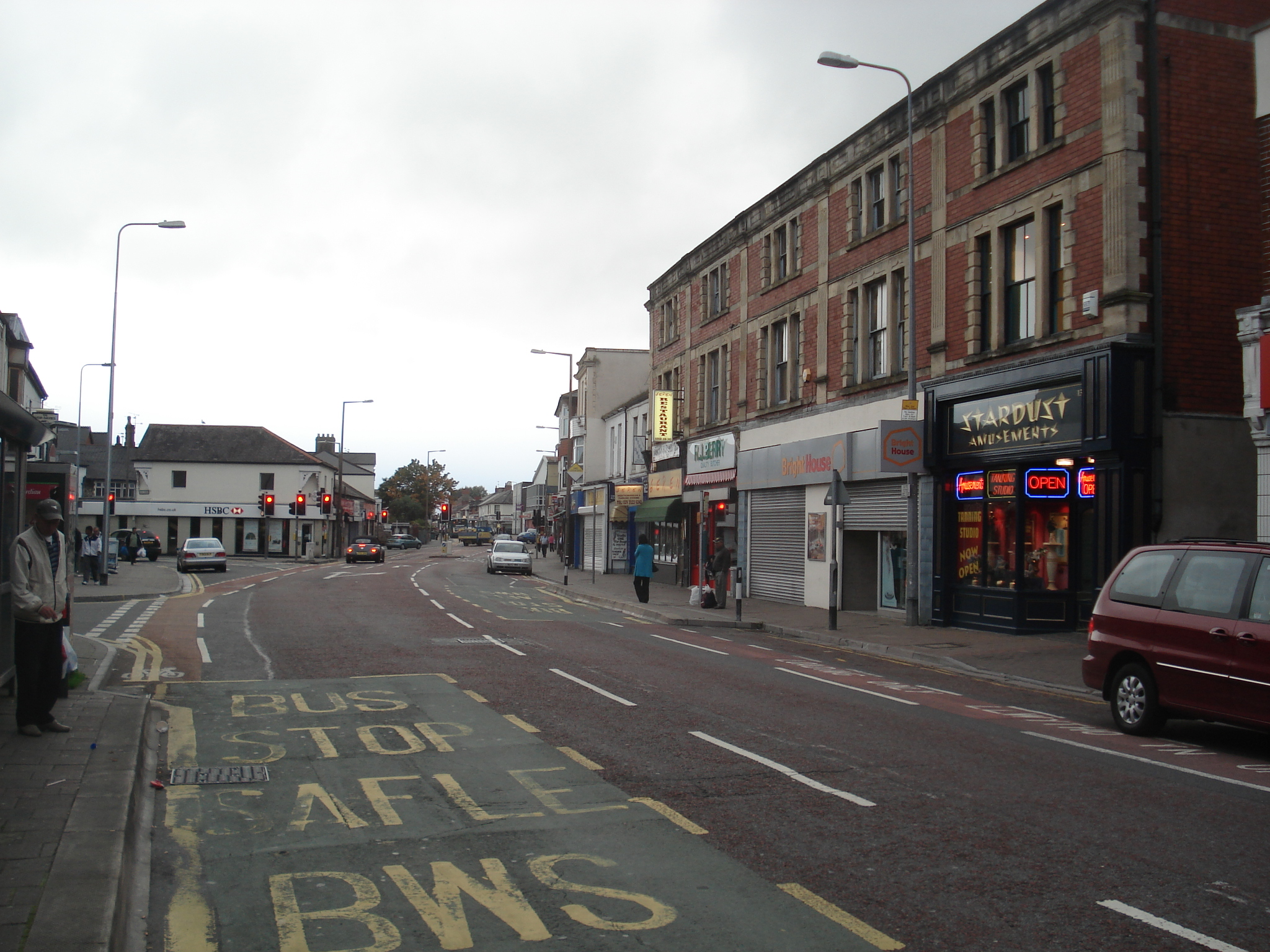
Cowbridge Road East

The main road through the district is Cowbridge Road East, a busy thoroughfare with many shops and cafes as well as pubs and restaurants and independent retailers. . This is known locally as "The Strip". Canton is home to Thompson's Park, Victoria Park, and Sanatorium Park, to the education centre Llanover Hall, and to the Chapter Arts Centre, which is housed in the former buildings of Canton High School.

Though the area has strong working-class roots, many artists and young professionals have found the proximity to the city centre and the number of arts venues and pubs an attraction.

== Name ==
The English name is a contraction of "Saint Canna's Town", a calque of the original Welsh language name, Treganna. While both Treganna and nearby Pontcanna ultimately derive from the 6th-century saint, they may both be more directly named after the stream that also bares her name, the Nant Canna, a brook that flowed through the area and into the Taff at the modern Brook Street. Following the rapid growth of Cardiff in the nineteenth century the Canna was culverted in the 1860s.

== History ==
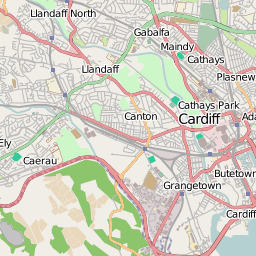

=== Middle Ages ===
Canton, or Treganna in the Welsh language, was formed around a 13th-century Manor in Cardiff and assumed lands from nearby Llandaff parish under the stewardship of an Earl (or Baron) de Kanetune, although today the manor comes under the jurisdiction of the Manor of Llandaff. It is believed that Canton is named after Saint Canna, the holy matron in the Celtic age of Saints, and Canna herself is reputed to have been a relative of King Arthur.

In 1215, a parishioner called Lucia de Kanetune is recorded as occupying a field ‘near the Earl's wall’. In 1230, a man named as Walter de Canetune is named in the Cardiff charter, and signed the charter, obviously as a resident of quite high status. In 1262, a doctor or ‘Physicus’ called Nicholas de Kanetone gave evidence in a legal dispute between the Abbeys of Margam and St. Peter's, Gloucester. In 1290, Richard de Canetone is recorded as a witness on the new Cardiff charter. Also in 1290 (Cartae 1 page 294) records:

“John, son of Robert de Landaf, granting to Milo de Regny a rent of sixpence arising out of three acres of land with the appurtenances, which John de Lake, formerly bailiff of la Lekwiffe, had of my fee under Kanetone, in Sudcrofte. As also one penny rent from John, son of John Godman of Kaerdif, for three other acres in the same Sudcrofte under Kanetone." (Richard de Kaneton was also one of the witnesses to this charter.)

=== A medieval market ===
From around 1250, for several hundred years Canton Cross was the site of the largest and most significant trading market in the South Wales area. The market was open daily except Sundays on the extensive Canton common lands at the junction where Llandaff Road and Leckwith Road now cross Cowbridge Road East, opposite where the Canton Cross Vaults public house still stands.

Goods, including all manner of fresh food stuffs, live animals and household items were brought from all over Cardiff and the South Wales Valleys to be traded at the market. Items that were to be exported were then transported or herded to the docks at Cardiff, Penarth and Swanbridge. Imports of fresh foods and tradeable goods were also brought to the market from those ports.

In the year 1450, stewardship of the Manor of Caneton is recorded as having been granted to Sir David ap Mathew, Lord of Llandaff manor but a resident of Radyr.

=== 19th and 20th centuries ===
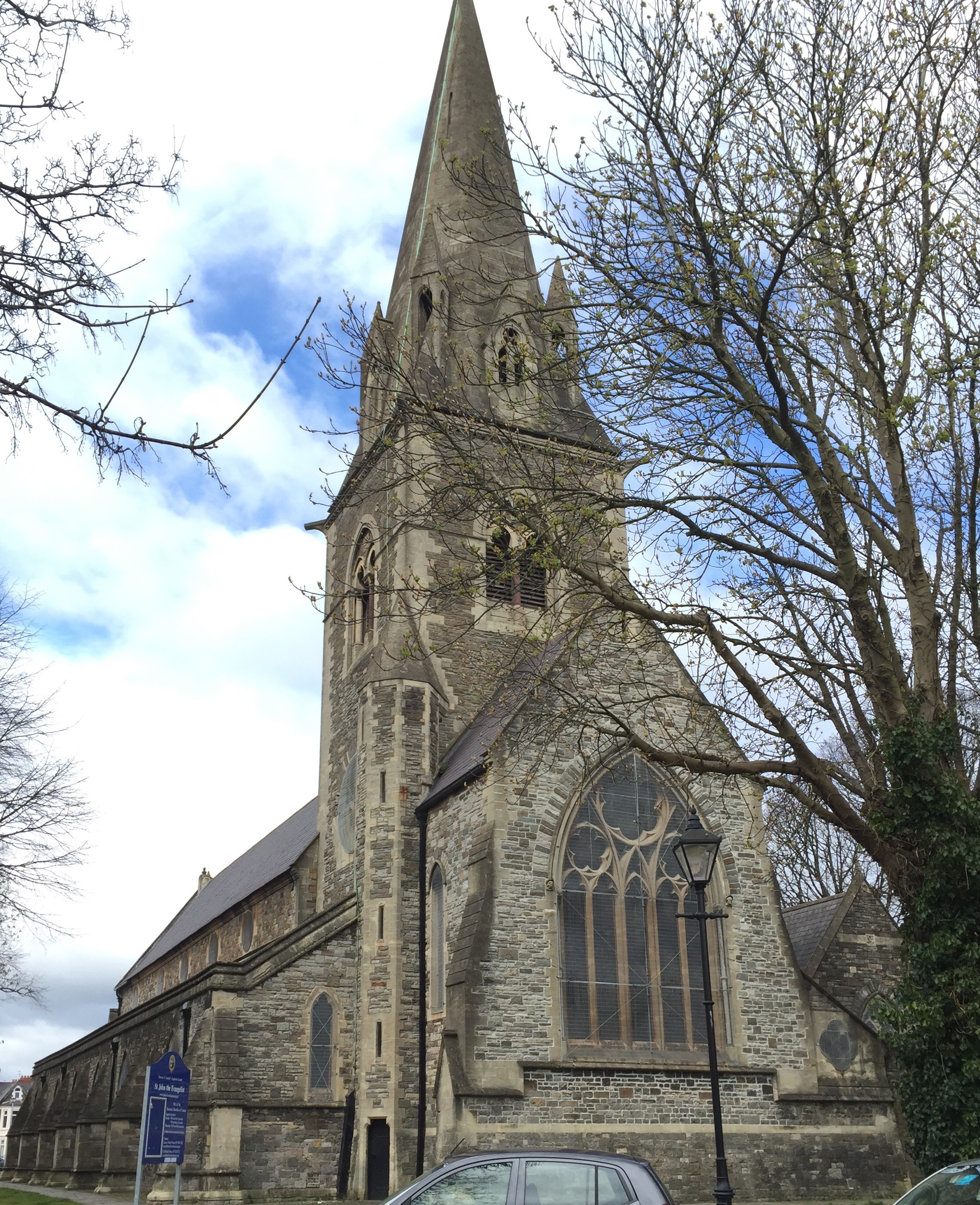
St John's Church, Canton

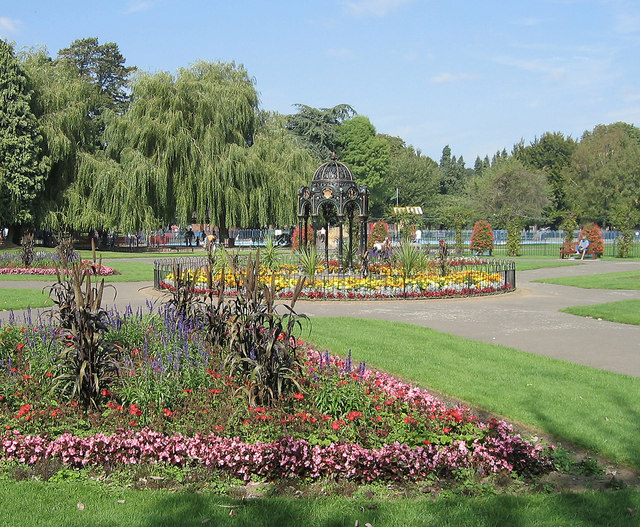
Victoria Park, Canton, in summer

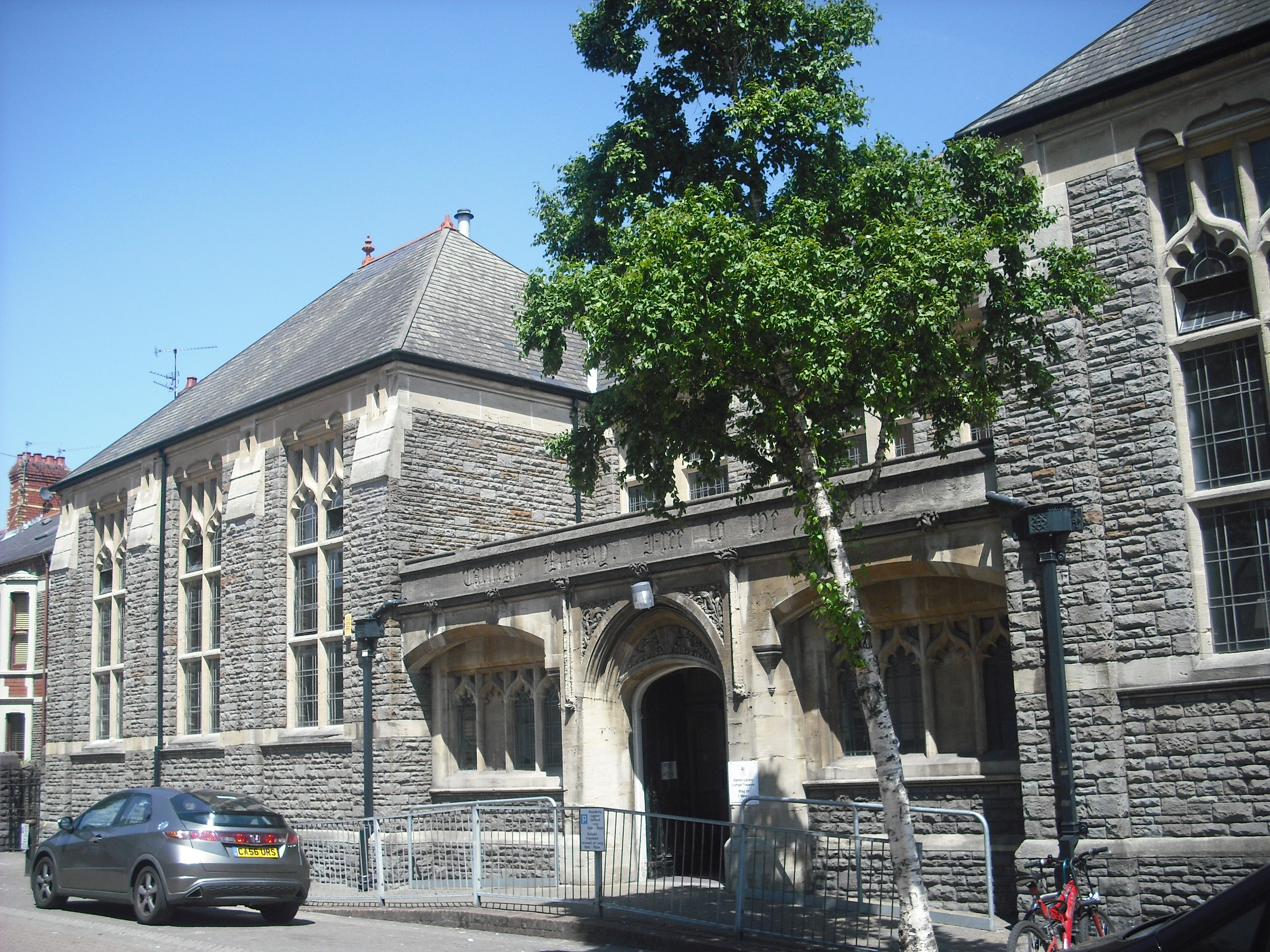
Canton Library

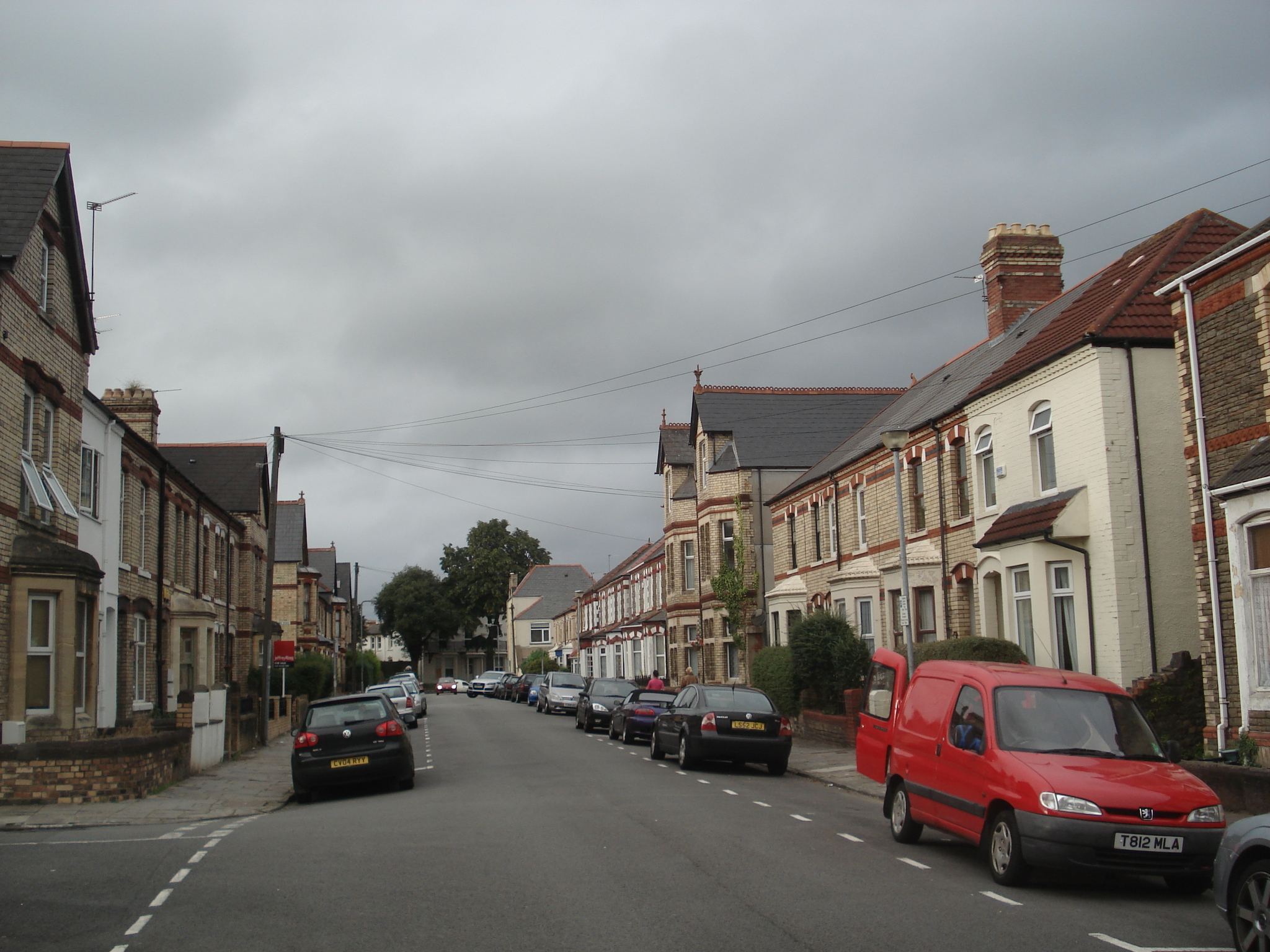
A typical Canton Street

In 1853 St. Johns, Canton was completed and opened as a local chapel annexe of nearby Llandaff Cathedral. From around 1840, Halket Street, Canton, became home to many Irish families, indeed Canton was the recognised centre of Cardiff's increasing Irish community, most of whom were fleeing the potato famines in their own country and seeking work and housing in the ports of Liverpool and Cardiff. In 1870 the large Atlas Engineering works was built in Canton and opened its doors, creating many new skilled jobs in the area.

The independent hamlet of Canton was incorporated as a district of the City of Cardiff by charter in 1875. Included in Canton was Pwll-coch, which had previously been considered part of Ely.

In 1899, the Manor House was recorded as still standing, on the west side of Canton Common, but it was in a poor condition and in danger of falling down. At that time it was under the occupation of a Mr Richard Williams, but there is no record of when the Manor House was eventually demolished.

The extensive common lands at Ely Common were already in the process of being converted into a municipal recreation ground called Victoria Park and new housing by the city council in 1899. The market near Canton Cross, which by then had wound down to a weekly cattle market, had been relocated to lands that now house Cantonian High School in adjacent Fairwater. The market yard and rows of stables would be full of the farmers’ carts and traps from all over the Vale of Glamorgan. The market dealt with sheep and pigs as well as cattle and the market buildings also included a slaughterhouse, so the animals could be butchered on site ready for transporting to the many butchers shops all over Cardiff. The market's tram depot and stabling was also next to Severn Road Council School, trams ran on rails with overhead electric power from the depot and Victoria Park to the city centre and on to other locations in Cardiff from 1902, until they were replaced by Cardiff's electric trolleybuses in 1950. The traditional Canton Cross common land now has Cardiff City FC's Cardiff City Stadium football ground and Cardiff International Sports Stadium built on it, with the last remnant of the medieval market represented only by Bessemer Road fruit market. In recent years many commercial car dealerships have moved into the area.

=== 21st century ===
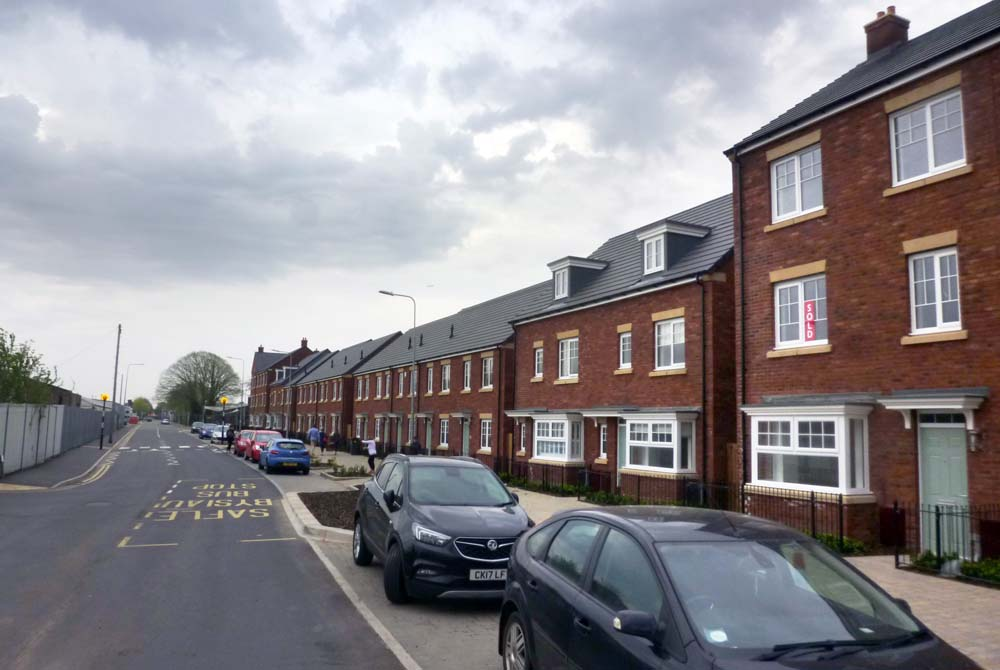
'The Mill' housing development

In 2016, work started to redevelop the old Arjo Wiggins Teape Paper Mill site adjoining Sanatorium Park, on the other side of the mainline railway. Eight hundred houses were expected to be completed, with the 'urban village' being marketed as The Mill.

== Transport ==
The main road running through the heart of Canton is Cowbridge Road East, which is served by many bus services. The following bus services all run through Canton:

Provided by New Adventure Travel:

- C1: Culverhouse Cross (Tesco) to Pontprennau (Asda) via Canton, Cardiff city centre, Albany Road and Pentwyn

Provided by Cardiff Bus:

- 1: City Circle via Cardiff Bay, Canton, Heath Hospital, Roath and Splott
- 2: City Circle via Splott, Roath, Heath Hospital, Canton and Cardiff Bay
- 13: City Centre to Drope via Canton and Ely
- 17: City Centre to Caerau/Ely via Canton
- 18: City Centre to Ely/Caerau via Canton
- 32: City Centre to St Fagans via Canton and Fairwater

Cowbridge Road East links the area with Culverhouse Cross, Ely, Caerau, Cardiff and Fairwater to the west and the city centre to the east.

Canton is served by Waun-Gron Park railway station in the west and Ninian Park railway station in south which are both on the Cardiff City Line between Central and Radyr railway stations.

Cardiff Canton TMD is home to the main depot of Transport for Wales.

== Welsh language ==
According to the 2021 Census, 3,729 or 24.0% of Canton residents (over 3 years old) could speak Welsh. This represented an increase from the 2011 census, which recorded 2,625 Welsh speakers (19.1%). The number and proportion of Welsh speakers had also risen from the 2001 census, when 1,964 residents (15.6%) reported being able to speak Welsh.

Canton has two Welsh-medium primary schools, Ysgol Gymraeg Pwll Coch and Ysgol Gymraeg Treganna. In 2024, 24.6% of pupils at Pwll Coch were reported to speak Welsh at home. In November 2025, 50.1% of pupils at Treganna came from Welsh-speaking households.

It has one Welsh-language place of worship: Salem (Presbyterian Church of Wales) on Market Road (founded 1856, current building built in 1910). The current Cardiff Chinese Christian Church on Llandaff Road was originally a Welsh-language Baptist chapel (opened 1853), but the language of the services was changed to English in the late nineteenth century.

== Education ==
Schools include Lansdowne Primary School, Radnor Primary School, St Mary's Primary, Ysgol Gymraeg Pwll Coch, Ysgol Gymraeg Treganna, and Fitzalan High School. It also has the large Canton Library.

== Sport ==
Canton Rugby Football Club is a rugby union team from the district of Canton, Cardiff, South Wales (established 1877). The club play their home games at Lawrenny Avenue, off Leckwith Road, Cardiff. It is a member of the Welsh Rugby Union and is a feeder for the Cardiff Blues. Canton RFC was founded and commenced playing in 1876 and was one of three clubs that founded the Cardiff & District Union. Only Canton RFC remain from the three teams that played within the Canton boundary during this time. The original ground was located at Alexandra Park, using the Boar's Head as the club headquarters (both on Leckwith Road). The teams of the 1880s provided a steady supply of players to Cardiff RFC, some of whom gained international caps for Wales.

Canton Rangers Football Club formerly known as Canton & Riverside and formed by cousins Mauro Caresimo and Vito Valluzzi, now in its 25th anniversary is Affiliated to the South Wales Football Association since 1999. The FAW Platinum accredited club operates Mini, Junior, Youth and Senior football teams from Under 5s through to Adults who play their games in the Cardiff and District Football League. The club also operates a Senior men's team who play in the South Wales Alliance Division. The club has won a number of League and Cup competitions across a range of different age groups. In May 2015 the club won the Welsh Community Football Award for Club of the Year for South Wales, then winning FAW Community Club of the year for Wales in May 2016.

Canton Liberal also reside from the Canton Area. The Liberal's were formed in 2006 and are affiliated to the South Wales Football Association. The Club since their formation have risen through the welsh pyramid system. The Senior 1st Team sit one promotion away from the Newly Formed Welsh Football League and play their home games at the Cardiff International Sports Campus as the host community club associated with the facility. The Senior Reserve side play their games within the Cardiff & District Football League.

In the Cardiff City Stadium (home of football club Cardiff City F.C.), the West Stand is now named as the 'Canton Stand' of the stadium.

== Government ==
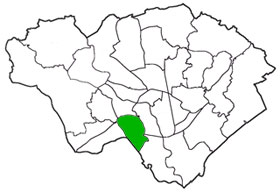
Canton electoral ward of Cardiff

Canton is both an electoral ward, and a community of the City of Cardiff. There is no community council for the area. The electoral ward of Canton is located in the constituency of Cardiff West. It is bounded by Fairwater and Llandaff to the north; Riverside and Grangetown to the east; the Vale of Glamorgan to the south; and Caerau and Ely to the west.

Canton Ward is represented by three County Councillors on Cardiff County Council. Since Cardiff became a unitary authority in 1996 Canton has been represented by Labour Councillors. Currently they are Stephen Cunnah, Susan Elsmore and Jasmin Chowdhury. They hold an advice surgery every other Saturday morning (except in August) at Canton Library, Library Street from 10.00 - 11.00am.

== Notable people ==
- Charlotte Church, singer, resident of Canton.
- Frederick Charles Davies, half-mile world champion runner better known as ‘Tenby Davies’, lived at Preswylfa Street.
- Ryan Giggs, former Manchester United F.C. footballer, Welsh capped international footballer.
- James Childs Gould Industrialist and Member of Parliament for Cardiff Central, 1918-1924.
