= Pontcanna =

District and community in Cardiff, Wales

Coordinates: 51°29′26″N 3°12′08″W

- Community
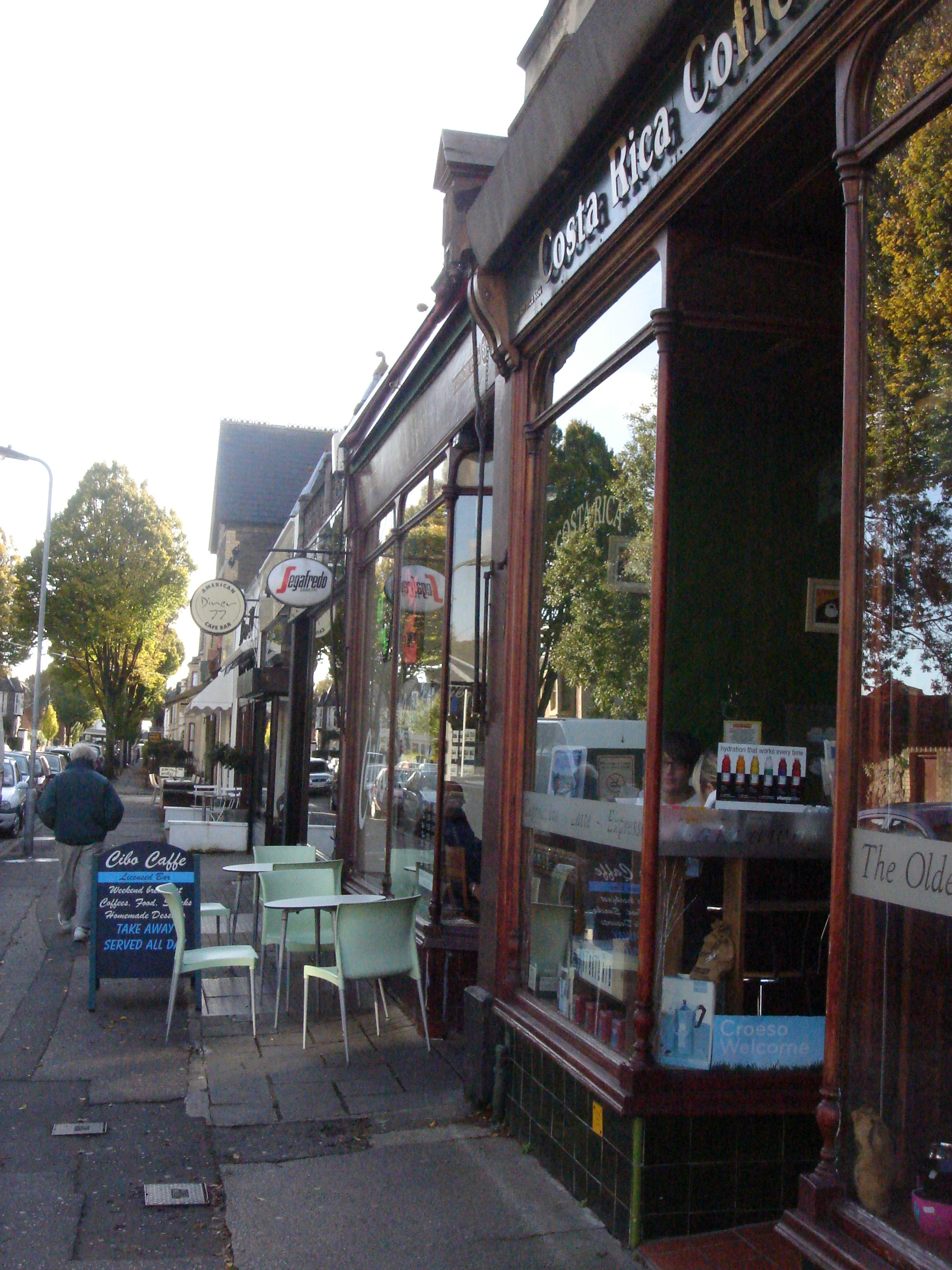
- Row of cafés on Pontcanna Street.

- Location within Cardiff
- Principal area: Cardiff
- Country: Wales
- Sovereign state: United Kingdom
- Police: South Wales
- Fire: South Wales
- Ambulance: Welsh
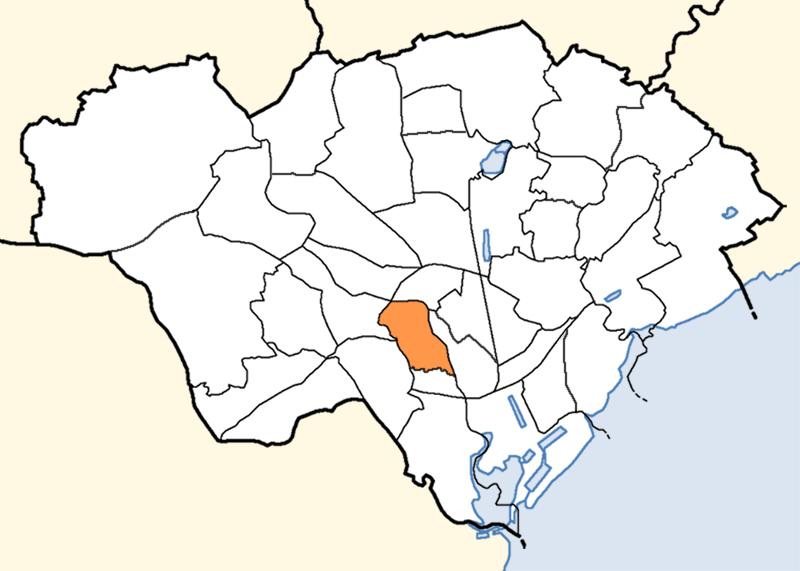
- List of places UK Wales Cardiff Map of the community

Pontcanna (Welsh for 'pont bridge + Canna') is an inner-city district and community in the west of Cardiff, Wales. It is located adjacent to Canton and a short distance from the city centre. Its borders are approximately indicated by Western Avenue, the River Taff, Cowbridge Road East and Llandaff Road.

== Description ==
Pontcanna is an area of wide tree-lined streets and large houses. It is a relatively wealthy area with numerous cafes and independent retailers centred on Pontcanna Street and Cathedral Road. There is both a large English-born population (roughly 25%) and a smaller Welsh-speaking population (roughly 20%). The area was formerly home to the television studios of TWW, Teledu Cymru, HTV and S4C's headquarters; the BBC Wales's Broadcasting House was nearby in Llandaff.

Many of the larger villas (particularly on Cathedral Road) have been converted into flats, guest houses or business premises. Located on the edge of Cardiff city centre, Pontcanna gives easy access to the centre for professionals, as well as access via the Gabalfa Interchange to the A48(M) motorway.

== History ==
The name Pontcanna stems from Pont Canna Farm, which in turn was named after a bridge across the Whitehouse Brook, a one-time tributary of the River Taff which ran between Llandaff Fields and Riverside. The bridge is believed to have stood near the junction of what, today, are Teilo Street and Cathedral Road. The bridge was removed (and the brook covered up) in 1896. Saint Canna is said to have been a 6th-century saint, although there is little early evidence of her existence.

What is nowadays Pontcanna was almost completely open farmland until the late nineteenth century. The main route, Cathedral Road, was previously known as Pontcanna Lane, running between Plasturton Farm in the south and Pontcanna Farm to the north. In 1854 Sophia, widow of the 2nd Marquess of Bute began to finance the creation of a 41-acre garden on the site of Plasturton Farm, next to the River Taff and Cardiff Bridge. This is now a public amenity known as Sophia Gardens and was a catalyst for the development of Pontcanna.

Between 1885 and 1900 the large villas along Cathedral Road were constructed. Plasturton Avenue and Plasturton Gardens were then added at the turn of the twentieth century.

A large synagogue, designed by Delissa Joseph of London, was constructed and opened at the south end of Cathedral Road in 1896–7. After Cardiff's Jewish community had largely moved to the suburbs, it was closed in 1989. It has been converted into luxury offices.

A chapel belonging to the Presbyterian Church of Wales, designed by Edgar G.C. Down of Cardiff, was built at the north end of Cathedral Road in 1903. It has since ceased to be a chapel and has been subdivided into office accommodation.

In 1951 the Sophia Gardens Pavilion was opened. This was a major entertainment venue for the city, hosting top stars such as Danny Kaye and Tommy Steele. In 1982 the roof collapsed after a heavy snow storm and the Pavilion was closed.

Some of the large villas along Cathedral Road have been replaced by modern office buildings. For example, No. 8 Cathedral Road was rebuilt in the 1970s to create offices for Alex Gordon & Partners, architects of Transport House (see below).

Transport House, prominently located at the south end of Cathedral Road, was designed by the Alex Gordon Partnership and opened in 1978. It is 5 storeys in height, constructed using pre-cast concrete panels. It is the headquarters for the Wales TUC and other trade union organisations.

== Parks and leisure facilities ==
Sophia Gardens and Pontcanna Fields form a large strip of parkland between Pontcanna and the River Taff. Pontcanna Fields was acquired by the Cardiff Council from the 5th Marquis of Bute in 1947. The parkland includes the Cardiff City Riding School, football pitches and allotments.

Plasturton Gardens is a small public park between Plasturton Avenue and Plasturton Place.

The SWALEC Stadium (home to Glamorgan County Cricket Club) and the Sport Wales National Centre are located on Sophia Close, just north of Sophia Gardens Park.

== Government ==
Pontcanna is part of the Cardiff electoral ward of Riverside, and in the Cardiff West UK parliamentary constituency.

In 2016 Pontcanna became a local government community in its own right, having previously been part of the Riverside community. However, it does not have a community council.
