= Lansdowne Primary School =

School in Cardiff, UK

Coordinates: 51.481°N 3.214°W

Lansdowne Primary School (Welsh: Ysgol Gynradd Lansdowne) is a Victorian primary school that opened in 1898 in Canton, Cardiff, Wales.

== History ==
The school was designed by architects Veall & Sant and opened in January 1898.

During the First World War the school was commandeered and used as a military hospital, before reopening as a school again in 1918. The school was badly damaged by incendiary bombs during the Second World War, when a bombing raid hit Cardiff in January 1941.

In the last 20 years the school has seen the fabric of the building being renovated with new double glazing on the first floor of the Juniors building In the mid-1990s a nursery school was added and about a year after the schools centenary year the overgrown and neglected nature garden was removed. On the cusp of the new Millennium the long-standing headmaster, Mr Davies retired and was presented with a wooden garden bench as a mark of gratitude from staff and pupils.

In 2001 Lansdowne School and School House were granted grade 2 Listing as historic buildings.

== Present day ==
There are currently 382 children attending the school from nearly 200 local families. 71% of the children attending the school are from the local area and within walking distance. Lansdowne also has a Nursery Unit.

In November 2007 Cardiff Council proposed to close Lansdowne Primary School to provide a new site for the local Welsh medium primary school, Ysgol Treganna. This proposal culminated in a campaign by parents and children, with two bus loads of protesters arriving outside the Senedd in March 2010 to petition Education Minister, Leighton Andrews, to reject the closure.

On 17 January 2008 Lansdowne Primary celebrated its 110th Birthday. School pupils created a Victorian fair to mark the occasion.

In November 2011 the school received the CILT Cymru Award for their foreign language teaching and international links.
