= Cowbridge Road East =

Road in Cardiff, Wales

Coordinates: 51.4824°N 3.2093°W

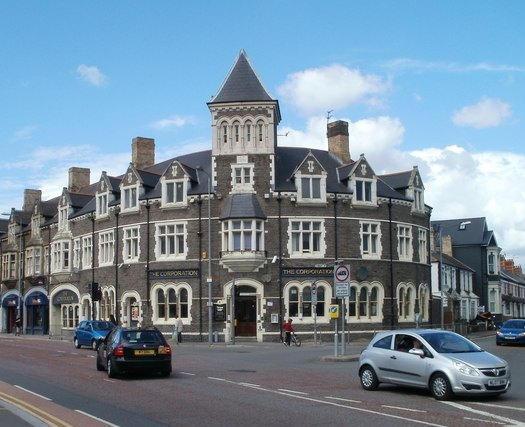
The Corporation pub, 188 Cowbridge Road East

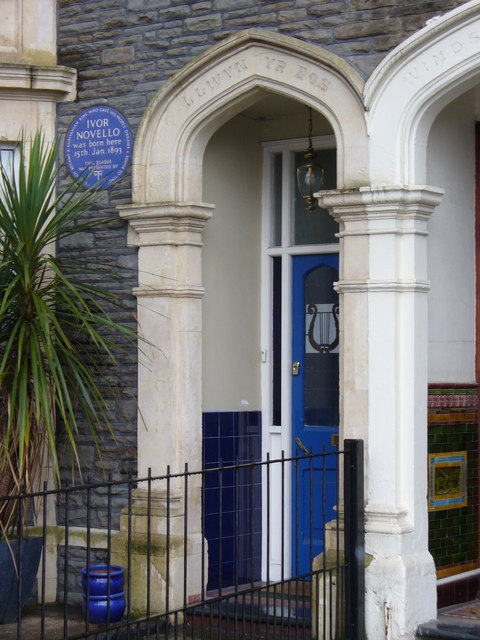
Llwyn-yr-Eos (Welsh for 'Grove of Nightingales'), birthplace of Ivor Novello in Cowbridge Road East

Cowbridge Road East (Welsh: Heol Ddwyreiniol y Bont-faen) is a major road in western-central Cardiff, the capital of Wales. It is the principal road which passes through the busy district of Riverside and Canton and connects Cowbridge Road West in the western districts to central Cardiff. The road is partly on the A4161. It is eventually crossed by Cathedral Road towards the city centre. It is home to numerous shops, pubs and restaurants.
