= Victoria Park, Cardiff =

Park in Cardiff, Wales

Victoria Park
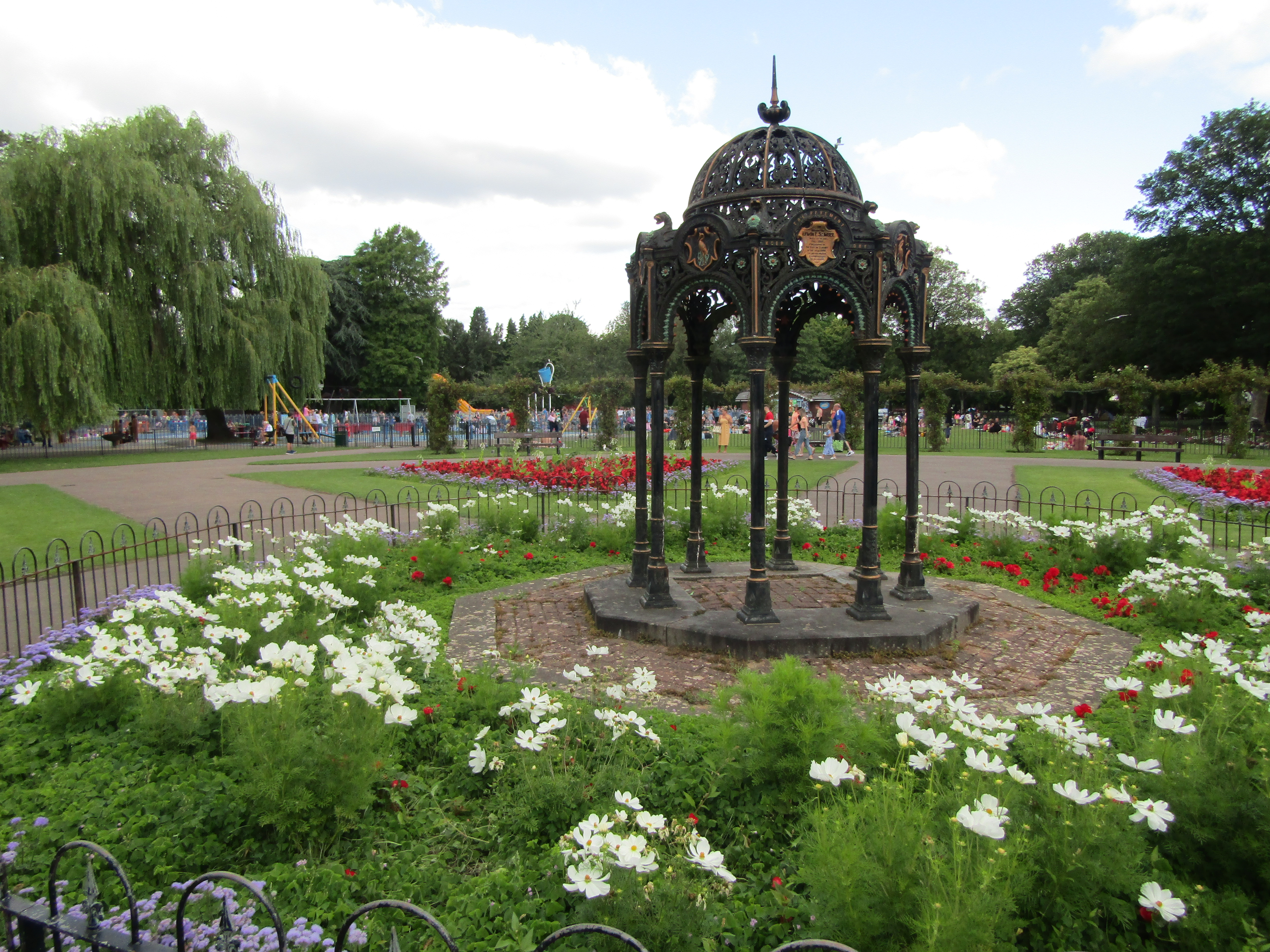
- Fountain canopy and gardens
- Interactive map of Victoria Park
- Location: Victoria Park Rd East, Canton
- Nearest city: Cardiff
- Coordinates: 51.485°N 3.219°W
- Established: 1897
- Owner: Cardiff Council

Cadw/ICOMOS Register of Parks and Gardens of Special Historic Interest in Wales
- Official name: Victoria Park, Cardiff
- Designated: 1 February 2022; 4 years ago
- Reference no.: PGW(Gm)23(CDF)
- Listing: Grade II

Listed Building – Grade II
- Official name: Former Drinking Fountain canopy in rose garden of Victoria Park
- Designated: 19 May 1975; 51 years ago
- Reference no.: 87733

Victoria Park is a public park in the Canton district of Cardiff in south Wales at Cowbridge Road East.

As its name suggests, it is a traditional Victorian era park named after Queen Victoria and has retained much of its original charm. The park was created as a municipal recreation ground by Cardiff City Council through a city charter between 1897 and 1898 to celebrate the Diamond Jubilee of Queen Victoria, marking her record sixty years on the throne. The park occupies part of the former Llandaff Common.

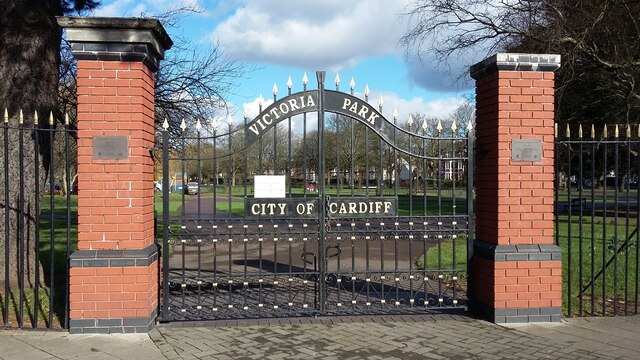
The main park gates

The park covers nearly twenty acres (8 ha) and still contains the original model boating and paddling pool which remains a very popular attraction in summer, plus a playpark for younger children. At the very north of the park there are tennis courts and a synthetic turf field for 5-a-side football. The original 1898 bandstand had fallen into disrepair and had been demolished but, in 1998, a replica of the original bandstand was erected on the original site to mark the park's centennial celebrations.

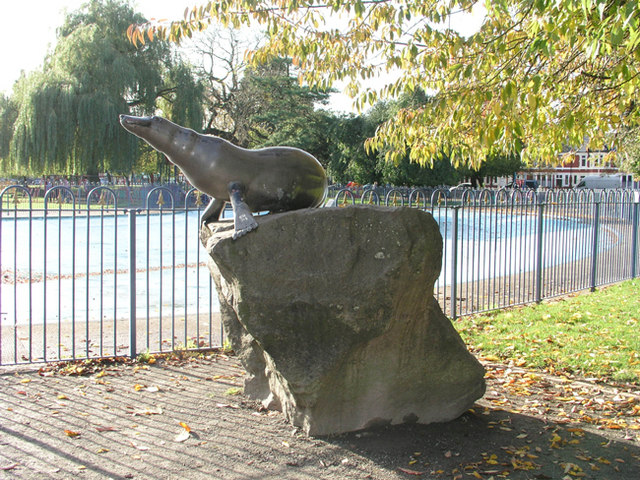
Billy the Seal sculpture by David Petersen

There are many mature trees and blossom trees in spring, together with crocuses and daffodils and flowerbeds that burst with colour during summer. There are wide paths and a refreshment shop by the pool. Public music events, markets and fairs take place throughout the summer months. There is also a whimsical monument to Billy the Seal who lived from 1912 to 1939 in what is now the paddling pool. The park is one of the few remaining UK parks where the park keeper still lives in an on-site lodge. A splashpad has now replaced the paddling pool due to maintenance costs. Victoria Park is recognised as one of the best maintained in the Cardiff area and has received a Green Flag Award; it has been used for location filming for Doctor Who episodes, namely Forest of the Dead and The Lodger, as well as Mark of the Berserker for the related Sarah-Jane Adventures.
