= Cantonian High School =

Location
- Fairwater Road; Fairwater, Cardiff, CF5 3JR; Wales; 51°29′29″N 3°14′2″W

Information
- School type: Secondary
- Motto: The best from each success for all
- Established: 1907
- Status: Open
- Local authority: Cardiff County Council
- Department for Education URN: 401879 Tables
- Head of school: Geraint Jones
- Executive headteacher: Diane Gill
- Years offered: 7–13
- Age: 11 to 18
- Enrolment: 850
- Language: English
- Website: https://www.cantonian.org/

Cantonian High School is an English-medium 11-18 community school maintained by Cardiff local authority. It is located in Fairwater and serves the surrounding area in the west of Cardiff, Wales. There are currently more than 1000 pupils on roll and the school is continually growing. Although in the past it has often struggled, it has progressed significantly in recent years, and performed well in its most recent Estyn inspections, earning the title Cardiff's most improved school in Wales Online.

== History ==
The school opened in Market Road, Cardiff, in 1907 as Canton Municipal Secondary School and was renamed as Canton High School in 1933. The school admitted boys and girls, but the school was bombed in 1941 and the girls school moved to Llanover Hall. The boys and girls schools merged and moved to a new site in Fairwater in 1962 and took the name Cantonian High School when they became a comprehensive in 1969. The original building became the Chapter Arts Centre in 1971.

== Future plans ==
Cardiff Council is planning to completely rebuild Cantonian High School, to expand the Sixth Form capacity, and to provide a Specialist Resource Base for people with ASD.

== Notable people ==
- David Blanchflower
- Richard Fenwick, bishop
- Justin Kerrigan
- Joe Ledley, Wales footballer
- Danielle Lineker, Welsh model and celebrity
- Sir Phillip Wien, judge
