= Fitzalan High School =

- Ysgol Uwchradd Fitzalan
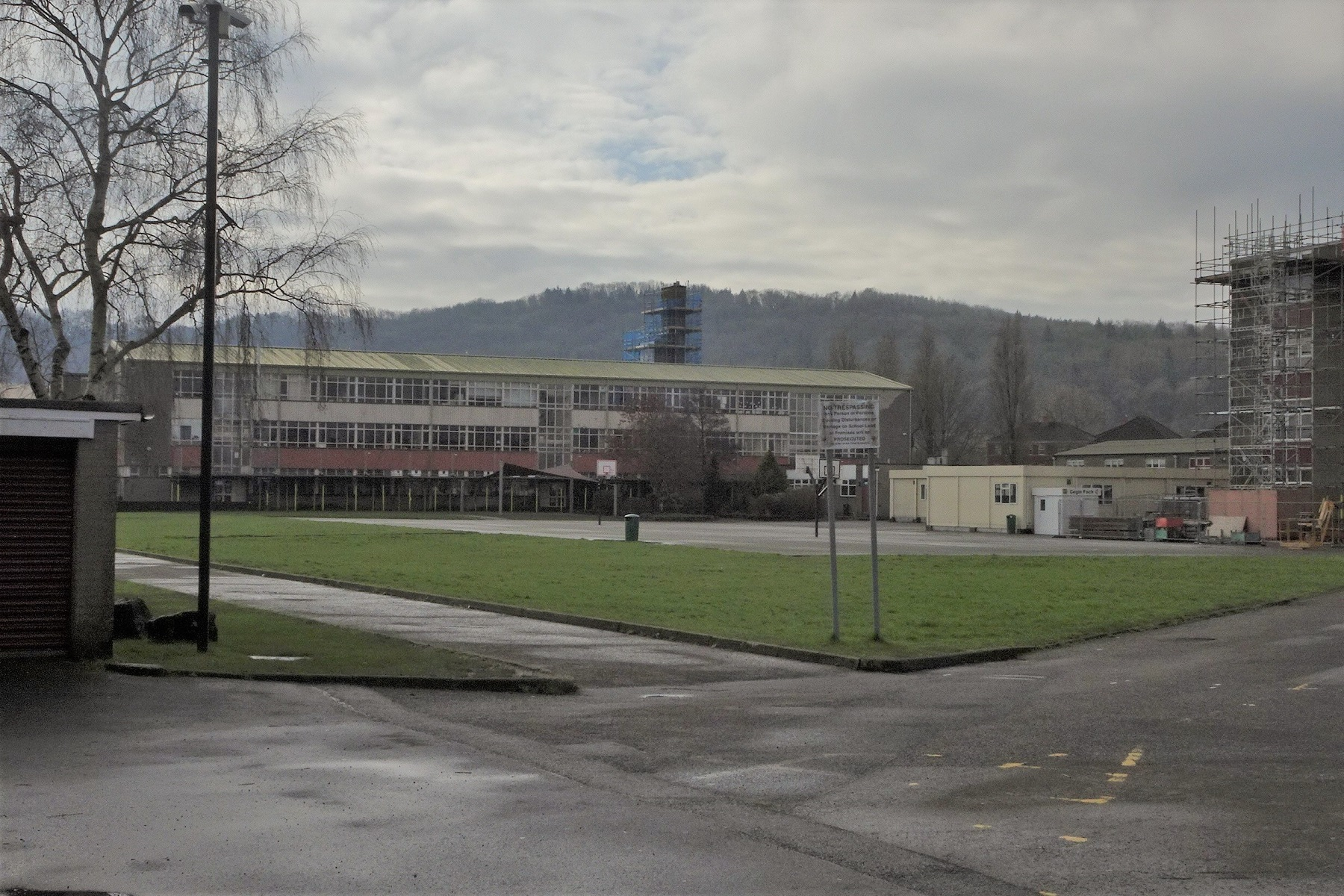

Location
- lawrenny avenue, Leckwith; Cardiff, Cardiff, CF11 8AP; Wales; 51.477°N 3.213°W

Information
- Type: Community secondary school
- Motto: Learning together to be the best we can be.
- Established: 1953
- Local authority: City of Cardiff Council
- Department for Education URN: 401877 Tables
- Head teacher: Adam Lear
- Teaching staff: 120.2 (on an FTE basis)
- Gender: Mixed
- Age range: 11–18
- Enrolment: 1,830 (2026)
- Student to teacher ratio: 14.2
- Language: English
- Houses: Dewi; Llewellyn; Glyndwr; Hywel
- Colours: Green, black, maroon
- Publication: Fitzalan News/Newyddion Fitzalan
- Website: www.fitzalan.cardiff.sch.uk

Fitzalan High School (Welsh: Ysgol Uwchradd Fitzalan) is an 11–18 mixed, English-medium community secondary school and sixth form in Leckwith, Cardiff, Wales.

== History ==
Fitzalan High School has links to Cardiff's first municipal secondary school at Howard Gardens, Adamsdown in 1884. The school later became Howardian High School and a Grammar School in 1941. Much of the school was subsequently destroyed by incendiary bombs in the Cardiff Blitz during the night of 3–4 March 1941 in World War II. The school's girls and boys relocated to newly built buildings, Lady Margaret High School for Girls (1948) and Howardian High School for Boys (1953), in Penylan.

After the war the building at Howard Gardens was partially repaired. A new technical school was opened in September 1953 with around 200 boys. It was officially named ‘Fitzalan Technical High School’ in December 1953.

The Howard Gardens site was to be re-developed (as Cardiff School of Art & Design) and Fitzalan Technical High School acquired new premises on the present site in Lawrenny Avenue, Canton, Cardiff which were opened on Tuesday 3 March 1964. In January 1968 the school was renamed Fitzalan High School (dropping 'Technical'), becoming a comprehensive school.

It was announced in 2017 that Fitzalan High School would be one of three major secondary schools in Cardiff to be completely rebuilt and replaced as part of City of Cardiff Council's £284 million improvement plans. The school moved to the new building in 2023.

== Organisation and communications ==
Pupils are grouped according to their abilities with the more able pupils placed in an express set. Pupils with special educational needs receive specialist support in class to ensure that they can access the curriculum fully. The school has four Houses: Dewi, Llewellyn, Glyndwr, and Hywel. The school has a website, and issues a regular newsletter on school activities. A School Council exists for pupils to raise any issues through this forum. It has many community links and local residents and interest groups, who are allowed to use the extensive facilities. The school has an established and published policy on 'anti-bullying' for all pupils. A Parent Teacher Association (PTA) was formed in 1978 called the ‘Friends of Fitzalan‛. It supports the school, raises funds, and helps organise social events.

In 2007 the school embarked on a program to reduce its carbon footprint after an audit by the Carbon Trust. Steps taken included installing "eco-quiet" computers, one of which was to be powered by a demonstration wind turbine.

The school was awarded the NAACE Mark for excellence in the use of ICT in November 2005.

Organised Sports and Arts

The school campus includes two gymnasia, a multi use dance studio, two indoor multi-use halls, two fitness suites, a sports hall, a swimming pool, four grass football and rugby pitches and an artificial cricket square. In addition daily access to the Gol Centre, comprising twelve five-a-side artificial football pitches, the Welsh International Athletics Stadium and artificial sports pitches. BTEC sport lessons take place both in the school and in Cardiff City Football Club.

- In 1982, the school football team won the English Schools Football Association Cup, the first time that this cup had been taken out of England.
- Fitzalan has traditionally had a strong chess team, winning the Welsh Schools Championship in 1984 and 1985, and in 2001 and 2002.
- The school hall was used during filming for "School Reunion", an episode of the long-running British science fiction series Doctor Who, first aired on 29 April 2006.
- A BBC2 documentary called "Fitzalan — School of Dreams" was filmed in March 2006.
- The school transformed one of its gyms into a drama studio complete with brand new apparatus

=== Results ===
In January 2020 a class of fifteen to sixteen-year-olds, who had had the same maths teacher since they started the school in year 7, all passed their mathematics GCSE six months ahead of schedule and all achieved A*, the top grade. Only 13% of pupils in Wales who had sat the WJEC GCSE the previous year had achieved A or A*. The achievement was widely reported in the British, Cameroonian and international media with the teacher Francis Elive described as 'The Maths Whisperer'.

== Facilities ==
- A £300,000 refurbishment of the school's twenty-metre swimming pool, and named the Peter Perkins Swimming Pool in memory of the former chair of governors. It was officially opened in March 2009. Facilities are open to the local community after school hours. As part of the joint venture between the Sport Wales, City of Cardiff Council’s Active Communities team and the school, a disused classroom has been turned into a fitness suite and multi-gym facility.
- Fitzalan was the first school to install state-of-the-art 5-a-side astro pitches (identical to that of Real Madrid), in partnership with Gôl Football Centres, and a new £600,000 sports hall. The hall has many uses, including Cricket, Football, Basketball, Netball, Tennis and Badminton.
- Two new full-sized astro pitches were recently completed, and are located next to the Leckwith Athletic stadium.
- The school introduced a new 5x60 regime – a Sport Wales programme aimed at increasing the number of secondary age pupils taking part in sport or physical activity for 60 minutes, at least five times a week. Pupils of any age can take part after school. The activities include football, netball, basketball, cricket, hockey and dancing.

== Head teachers ==
Fitzalan Technical High School, Howard Gardens

- 1953–1963, Mr Harold C. Eyre, BA

Fitzalan Technical High School, Leckwith

- 1963–1967, Mr Harold C. Eyre, BA

Fitzalan High School, Leckwith (as a comprehensive school)

- 1968–1979, Mr Peter L. Goble, MA
- 1979 - 1985 Mr Nick Jenkins
- 1985–2004, Mr Angus Dunphy
- 2005–2008, Mr Huw Jones-Williams
- 2008–, Mrs Cath Bradshaw

== School inspections ==
Fitzalan High School is inspected every six years by the independent statutory body Estyn, as part of the Welsh national programme of school inspection, funded by the Welsh Government. In 2017 they gained a rare "double excellent".

== Notable alumni ==
- Aseel Muthana, Islamic State of Iraq and the Levant member
- Mel Rees, goalkeeper
