= Bus transport in Cardiff =

Overview of bus system in Cardiff, Wales

Bus transport in Cardiff, the capital and most populous city in Wales, forms the major part of the city's public transport network, which also includes an urban rail network, Waterbus and international airport. Cardiff is a major city of the United Kingdom and a centre of employment, retail, business, government, culture, media, sport and higher education.

Most of the city's comprehensive bus network is operated by Cardiff Bus, which is owned by Cardiff Council. The main hub and terminus of the network was Cardiff Central bus station, which closed for redevelopment of the site in the autumn of 2015. The new Cardiff Bus Interchange opened in June 2024.

Operators such as Stagecoach South Wales and Newport Bus link the city with other urban areas in South Wales. Adventure Travel operates services including the Fflecsi demand responsive service in north Cardiff. TrawsCymru operates a long-distance route to Aberystwyth, Cardiff Airport (currently suspended) and West Wales, while National Express and FlixBus operate long-distance coaches to towns and cities throughout Wales, Scotland and England.

== History ==
=== Trams ===
Horse-drawn omnibuses ran in the city from 1845 to 1909 and horse trams from 1872 to 1904. The first tram route ran from High Street in the city centre to the Cardiff Docks and was operated by the Cardiff Tramway Company. In 1898, Cardiff County Borough Council obtained legal powers in an act of Parliament to take over all the tramways in the area and to launch electric trams. The new routes formally opened in May 1902 with the first recorded accident later that month – a collision with a cyclist. More than 23 million passengers were carried in 1904, up from 18 million the previous year. When Cardiff became a city in 1905, 131 electric trams were operating on the network, mainly focusing on the busy Cardiff Docks. In 1928, the network peaked at 142 cars and routes covering 19.5 miles (31.3 km). By 1929, the tram network stretched from Victoria Park in the west, to Grangetown and Cardiff Docks in the south, to Roath and Splott in the east, and to Gabalfa in the north.

The council initially refused to allow motor buses to operate in the city, but reversed this decision in 1910 and operated its own from 1920. 81 tramcars were also introduced by Cardiff Corporation Transport to negotiate the city's low railway bridges. By 1939, these vehicles were becoming worn out and it was decided to phase out tramcars.

=== Trolleybuses and motor buses ===
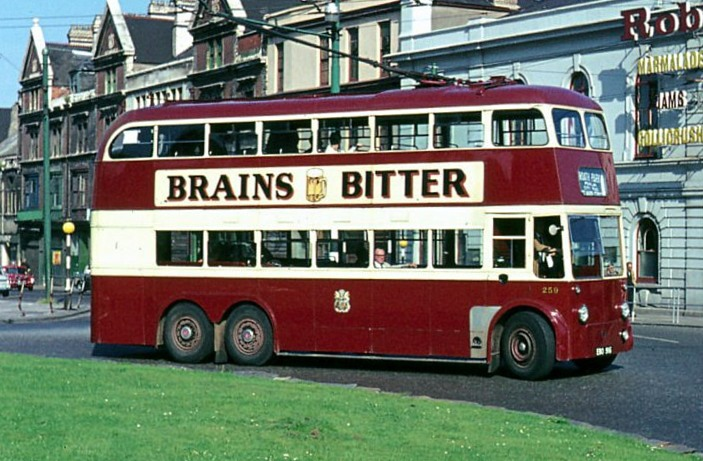
A Cardiff trolleybus in Custom House Street in 1966

In 1942, trolleybuses began to replace tramcars. The last tram service ran to Whitchurch in February 1950, making it the last place in Britain to commence trolleybus operation after Glasgow. Trolleybus routes were generally the same as tram routes although extensions were made. The furthest and final extension of the network came in 1955, to Ely, where trams had never run. At this point, the system peaked at 79 vehicles and 18 route miles.

In 1959, the Cardiff Corporation Transport (later City of Cardiff Transport) routes, with trolleybus routes in bold, were

- 1: Gabalfa – City Centre
- 2: Pengam – City Centre
- 3: Roath Park – Cathays – City Centre
- 4: Llandaff – City Centre – Penylan
- 5 (A/B): Victoria Park – Canton – City Centre – Llandaff
- 6: Cardiff Docks – City Centre – Llandaff
- 7 (A): Grangetown – City Centre – Tremorfa
- 8: Victoria Park – Lansdowne Road – City Centre – Roath
- 9: Cardiff Docks – City Centre – Gabalfa
- 10 A/B: Ely – Canton – City Centre
- 12 (A/B): Tremorfa (Pengam) – City Centre
- 16: Pierhead Building – City Centre
- 22A: Llanishen – Cyncoed – Penylan – City Centre
- 23: Whitchurch – City Centre
- 24: Penylan – Roath – City Centre – Whitchurch
- 27: St Georges – Caerau – Canton – City Centre
- 27B: Caerau – Canton – City Centre
- 27D: Culverhouse Cross – Caerau – Canton – City Centre
- 28 (A): Llanishen – Gabalfa – City Centre
- 28B: Rhiwbina – Birchgrove – City Centre
- 29: Thornhill – City Centre
- 30 (A): Newport – City Centre
- 32: St Fagans – Fairwater – City Centre
- 32 B/D: Pentrebane – Fairwater – City Centre
- 33: Morganstown – Radyr – City Centre
- 34: Llandaff North – City Centre
- 35: Penarth – City Centre
- 35A: Penarth – Cogan – Llandough – City Centre
- 36/41: Merthyr Tydfil/Tredegar – Caerphilly – City Centre
- 37: Canton – City Centre – Lisvane
- 38: Deri – City Centre
- 39 (A): Rhiwbina – City Centre – Ely Bridge
- 40 A/B: Heath – City Centre
- 43/44/47/48: Llanrumney – City Centre
- 45/46: Rumney – City Centre

Trolleybuses stopped on Wood Street, rather than at Cardiff Central bus station. A full transition to motor buses began in 1962 and was completed by 1970, bringing to an end 68 years of electric traction on the streets of Cardiff. The city has been served by motor buses ever since. Cardiff had the largest municipal bus fleet in South Wales with 253 buses. The fleet of 1960s and 70s maroon and cream double-deckers included AEC Regent V, Daimler Fleetline and Guy Arab V. The company also operated single deckers including AEC Swift.

=== Other operators ===
Between the 1960s and 1980s, Cardiff had many small coach operators:

Western Welsh was formed in 1929 and grew to cover an area from St Davids in West Wales to the English border, operating 319 buses in its South Wales fleet by 1970. In 1978 it became National Welsh/Cymru Cenedlaethol which also ran Red & White. The two companies closed in 1992.

Neath & Cardiff's brown and red AEC Reliance fleet operated to towns to the west, to Bridgend, Neath and Swansea in the 1970s. Its coaches were known as 'brown bombers'.

In June 1970, Alan Barrington Smith operated the 59 service from Newport to Cardiff, previously operated by Davies and Baldwin and Red & White, using Bristol vehicles. This route was acquired by Smiths in 1972 and incorporated into their route 31 that circled Newport, but dropping the extension to Cardiff.

CK Coaches Ltd was formed in 1974. In 1981, it gained two routes in the capital, charging lower fares and offering the first competition for the Cardiff municipal fleet within the city since 1927. Leyland buses were bought from London Transport (Daimler Fleetlines) and Leicester City Transport for these routes; one of these was the 54 to Cyncoed, which had a white and orange livery similar to that of Cardiff Bus, but made more use of the white colour. Its blue and white double-deckers served the heavily populated eastern suburb of Llanrumney. CK Coaches later operated a route to Llanedeyrn, and used Wood Street in the city centre rather than the main stands of Central station. The company's licences were revoked on 31 March 1982, ceasing the services.

Falconer and Watts operated tours and excursions, private hire and some contracts from Llanishen, a suburb to the north of Cardiff from 1919 to 1982, when they were taken over by Warners Fairfax of Tewkesbury.

Thomas Motor Services, a Barry-based company, at one time operated the sole bus link between Barry and Cardiff via Dinas Powys. Its Leyland Tigers ran on the route 304 from 1959 until 1970, with Leyland Leopards taking over until 1982. Thomas continued to operate the route using coaches.

Greyhound's fleet consisted of around a dozen coaches in a blue and ivory livery. Some were used for local school contracts, such as at St Teilo's in the Penylan area of Cardiff. Coastal Continental Coach Hire, which ceased trading in 2008, operated Leyland Atlanteans in a red and cream colour on school routes for Ysgol Gyfun Gymraeg Glantaf in Llandaff North.

== Bus stops ==
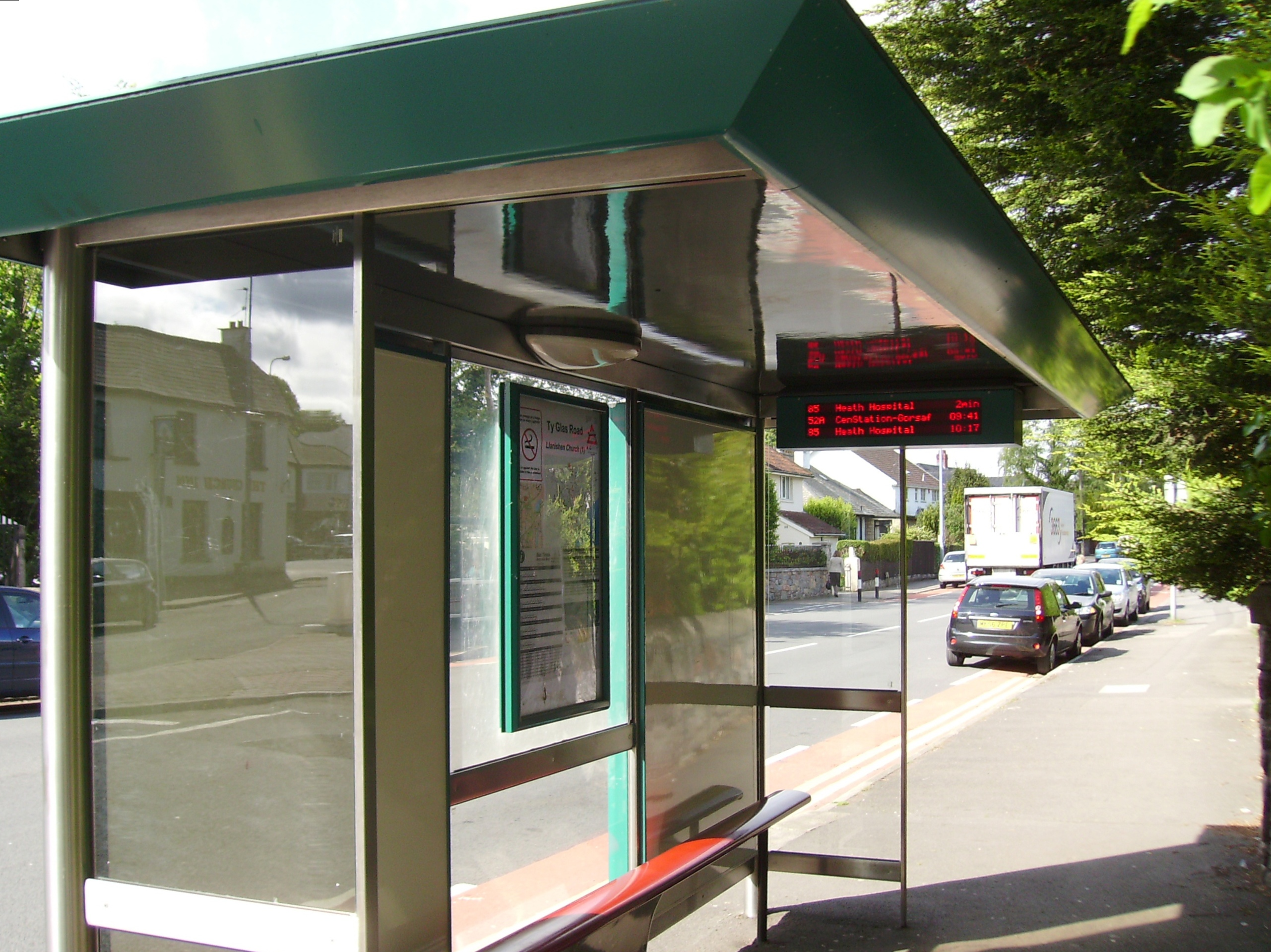
Bus stop in Llanishen displaying passenger information

Over 300 city bus stops have passenger information panels that display the estimated arrival times of bus services. This information can also be found online.

== School buses ==
Many school buses are operated by companies such as Adventure Travel, Cardiff Bus and Edwards Coaches. These are operated by school coaches or low floor double-deckers.

== Cardiff Central bus station ==
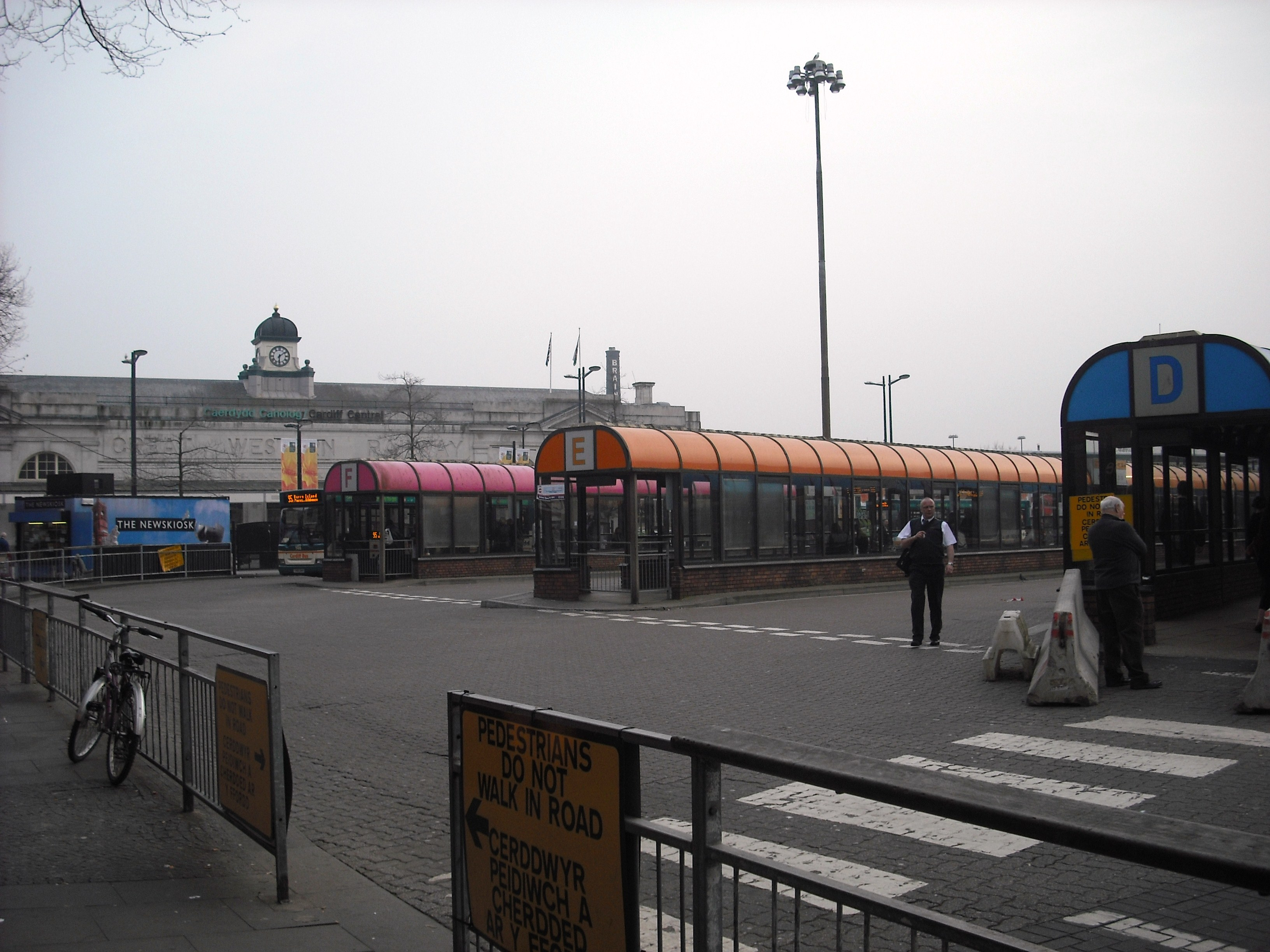
The south-eastern end of the former bus station with Central railway station in the background on Central Square

Cardiff Central bus station, on Wood Street, was formerly the hub of the city's and South Wales' bus and coach network. With 34 stands, it was the largest bus station in the city and in Wales. It was located adjacent to Cardiff Central railway station, forming a major bus-rail-cycle-taxi interchange.

Demolition began in 2008 with the terminus building being demolished. Before work began, there were 8 concourses lettered A–F and W (on Wood Street) with each concourse having numbered stands. Then, the stands were numbered B1–F2, JA–JD and JT–JQ.

The station handled the vast majority of bus and coach services that run in and through the city. Cardiff Bus accounted for 72 per cent of all bus services that stopped at the station by frequency.

Eating and drinking facilities, such as a Burger King and other shops and bus company offices, faced the concourses on Central Square. Taxi ranks were located on both sides of the station. Toilets and a newsagent were located at stand A, which was demolished in summer 2008 as part of the redevelopment of the station. Some services remained available in the adjacent Cardiff Central railway station.

On 1 August 2015, the remaining parts of the bus station were closed and demolished as a part of wider developments in the central Cardiff area. A remodelled Central Square and BBC Cymru Wales New Broadcasting House now occupy the site.

Several schemes for a replacement bus station were proposed and scrapped until a final scheme was agreed between the Welsh Government, financiers Legal & General and developers Rightacres in 2019. The new £89 million, 14-bay bus station is currently under construction by ISG Ltd, adjoining Central Square and facing the southern end of Westgate Street. It forms part of The Interchange, a curved eight-storey building which will include 318 for-rent apartments, two floors of office space and a retail unit on the ground floor. It was expected to be completed by the end of 2023, with several delays pushing the completion of the Cardiff Bus Interchange to the spring of 2024. Scheduled bus services at the new interchange began on 30 June 2024.

=== City centre ===
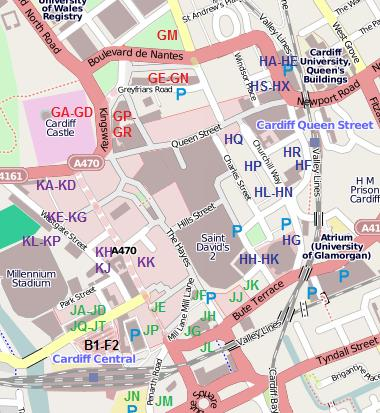
City centre bus stops

Most city bus services call at other significant bus stops in the centre. All city centre bus stops have a two letter code and most are found in clusters.

== Interchanges and integration ==
Cardiff's transport network also includes rail, taxi, cycle, water and air transport. Cardiff Central bus station was located next to Cardiff Central railway station, facilitating bus-rail interchanges. Many bus services stop at the 20 railway stations within the city.

The Cardiff Waterbus connects with bus services at Central Station and at Cardiff Bay.

The T9 TrawsCymru bus service connected the city centre to Cardiff Airport but was suspended during the COVID-19 pandemic in 2020 and is yet to be reintroduced.

== Local services and operators ==
=== Cardiff Bus ===
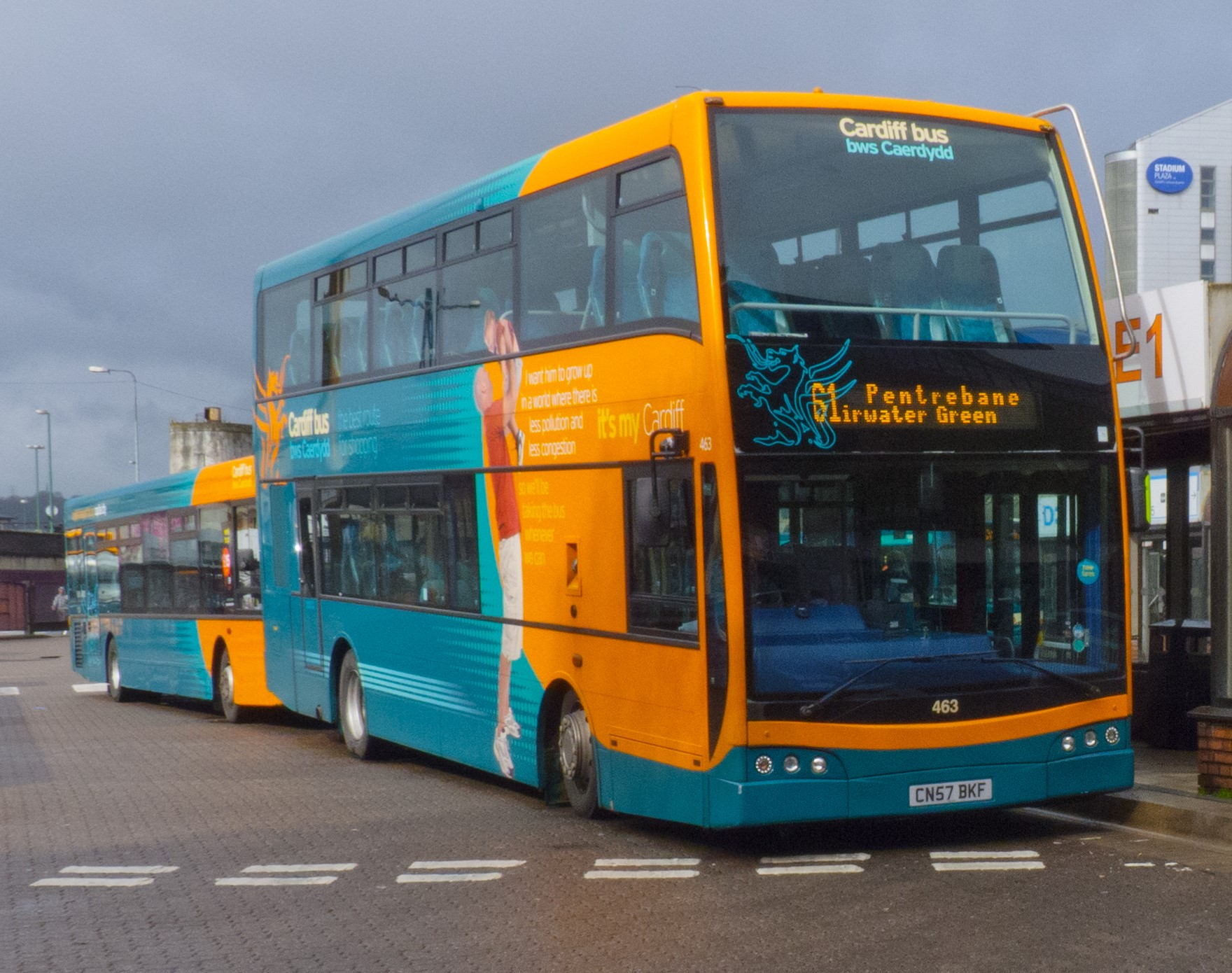
Cardiff Bus at the now demolished Cardiff Central bus station

Cardiff Bus is the dominant bus operator in Cardiff and also serves Penarth, Sully and Barry. Its network consists of 73 routes, including 8 high school routes, using Scania OmniCity, Yutong E12, Scania N230UD, Fencer f1, Irizar i3, Alexander Dennis Enviro200, Enviro300 and Enviro400 MMC, Mercedes-Benz Citaros 0295 and 0530, and MCV Evora. Cardiff Bus carries 100,000 passengers daily, has a turnover of £27million and employs around 720 people. The fleet and drivers are managed against a timetable using software systems supplied by UK based software supplier Omnibus Systems, which allows the real-time digital information displays positioned at many stops around the city, to inform people when the next bus is due and alerting waiting passengers of any delays. Raised kerbs have been installed at the majority of stops.

In addition to scheduled city buses, Cardiff Bus is contracted to operate some school routes in the city.

A smart card for Cardiff Bus passengers was trialled in spring 2009 and launched as the Iff card in October 2010. In March 2018, Cardiff Bus introduced contactless payment across its services. On the 29th November 2025, the Iff card was removed from use.

In January 2022, Cardiff Bus began to introduce 36 Yutong E12 electric buses to the city, part funded by the UK Department for Transport's ultra-low emissions bus scheme. A further 19 of the same type were introduced in April 2024, bringing the total number of electric buses to 55.

==== Free b ====
Cardiff Free b logo

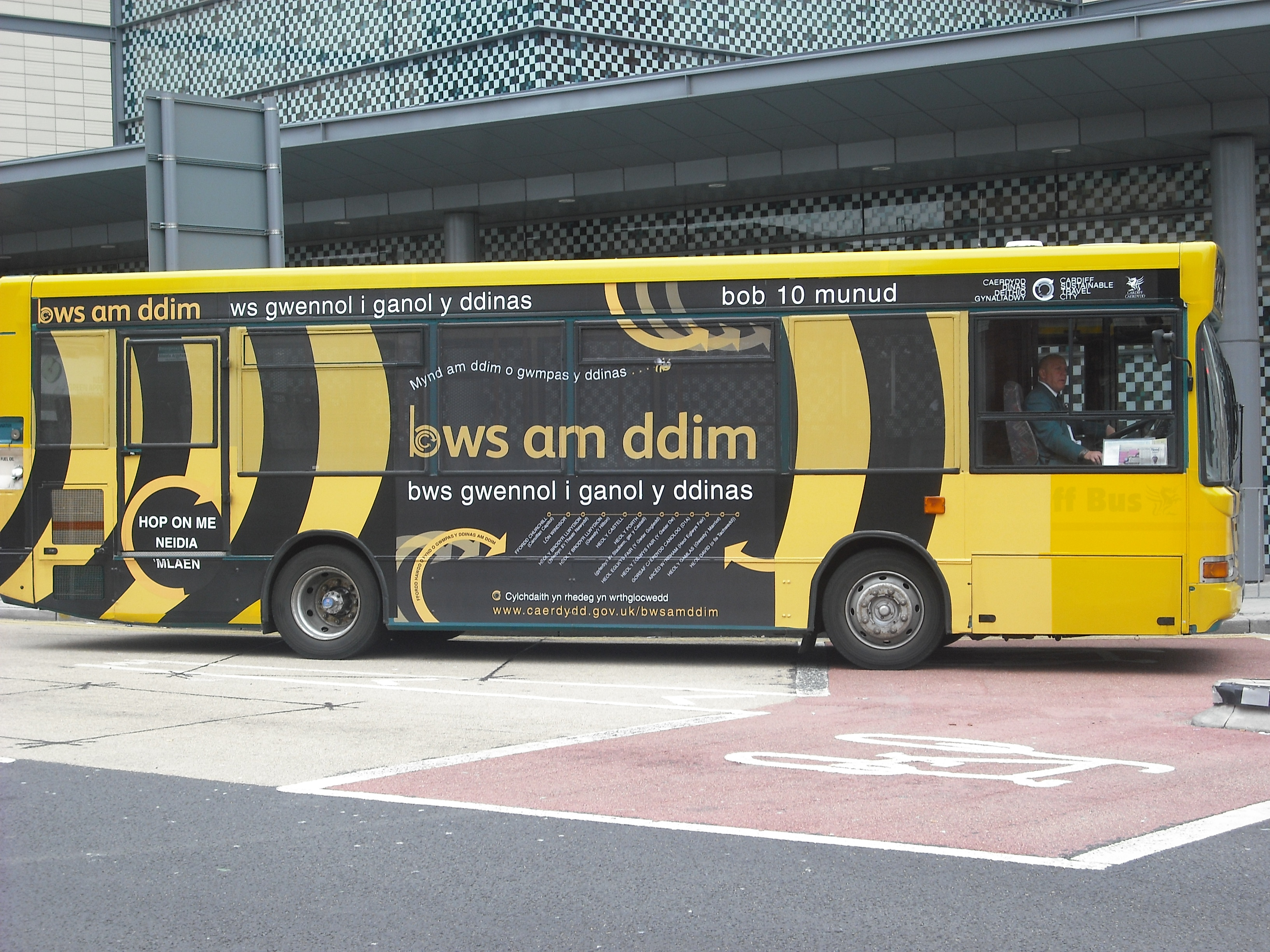
Plaxton Pointer MPD bodied Dennis Dart SLF at The Hayes in April 2010

Map of the bus route

Free b (Welsh: Bws am ddim Free bus) was a zero-fare shuttle bus that operated in Cardiff city centre, Wales. The route circled the edges of the city centre anti-clockwise. The service was operated by Cardiff Bus.

The service commenced on 12 October 2009 as a response to the creation of a "bus box" in Cardiff city centre. This was formed from the diversion of the terminus of many of Cardiff Bus's services from the Central Bus Station to stops around the edges of the city centre. The shuttle service was introduced to connect these stops, as well as those of Cardiff's four Park and Ride services. The three 28-seater buses in a yellow and black livery were introduced as part of a multimillion-pound joint council and Assembly Government-funded green initiative designed to encourage sustainable transport. Cardiff Council announced that because of low ridership, the Free b bus would be cancelled and replaced with an electric shuttle van. Council-operated electric buggies were introduced in October 2010 in order to carry disabled and elderly passengers around the city centre.

The Free b service followed a circular route that travels anti-clockwise around the city centre linking major bus and rail interchanges. The FreeB operated every 10 minutes until 20:00 on weekdays and until 18:00 on the weekend.

=== Stagecoach ===
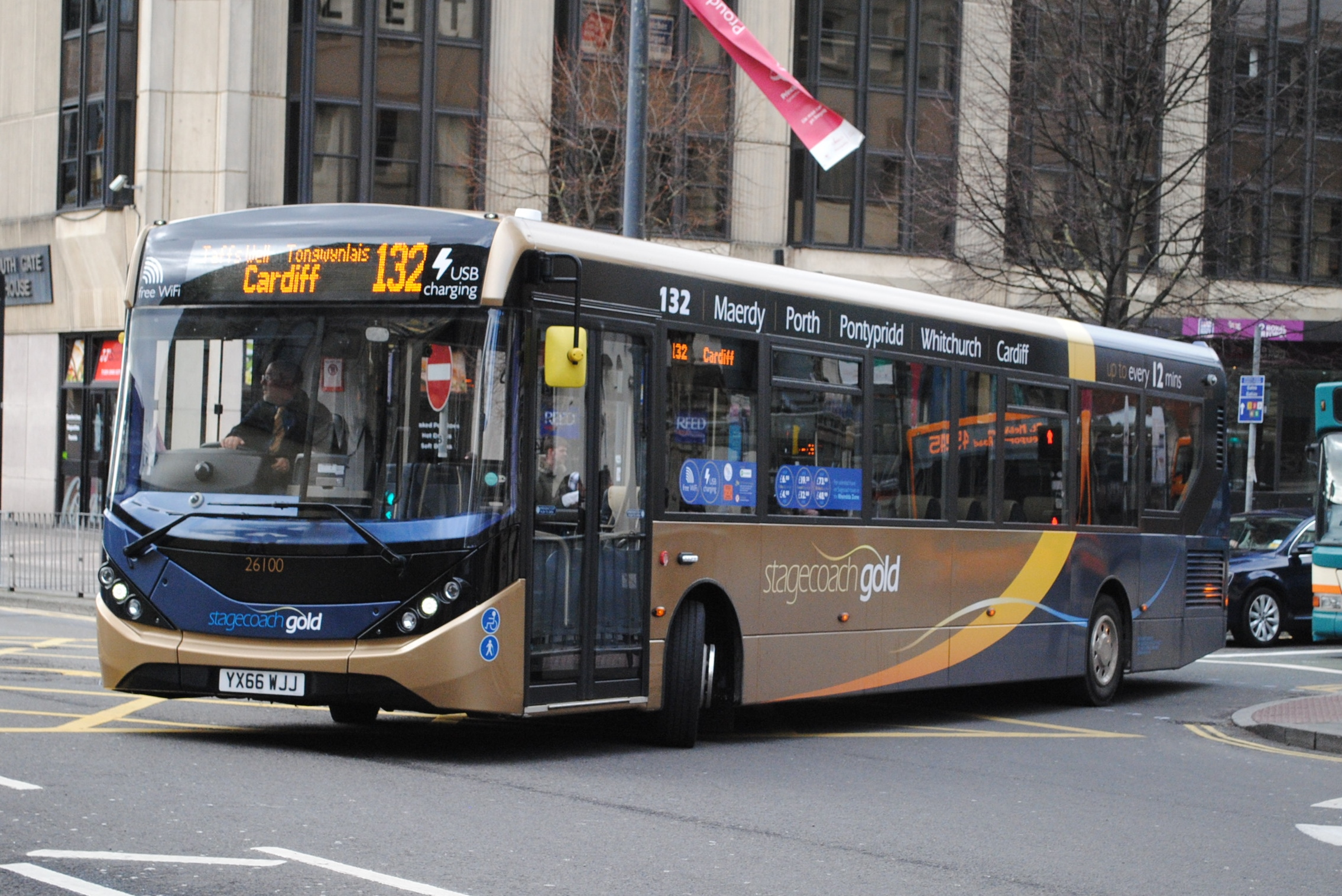
Stagecoach South Wales bus at the junction of Westgate Street and Wood Street, Cardiff

Stagecoach South Wales, which has its headquarters in Cwmbran, operates routes mainly to the South Wales Valleys from central Cardiff.

It also operates the TrawsCymru T4 between Cardiff and Newtown in the county of Powys in Mid Wales.

Its fleet of over 400 buses is one of the most modern in the country, and includes many low-floor, easy access buses with step-free entrances, dedicated buggy areas and wheelchair access.

It does not issue return tickets. However it issues a megarider pass for all day travel, valid from four weeks until a year. The Cardiff zone stretches to Taffs Well, Creigiau, Castleton and Travellers Rest.

In 2009, Stagecoach launched Wi-Fi on its X4 Cardiff-Hereford ADL/MAN Enviro 300 buses, which are themselves new, replacing older coaches that operated on the route.

Then in 2015, Stagecoach replaced the ADL/MAN Enviro 300's with new ADL/Scania Enviro 300's due to MAN Enviro 300's poor reliability.

=== First Cymru ===
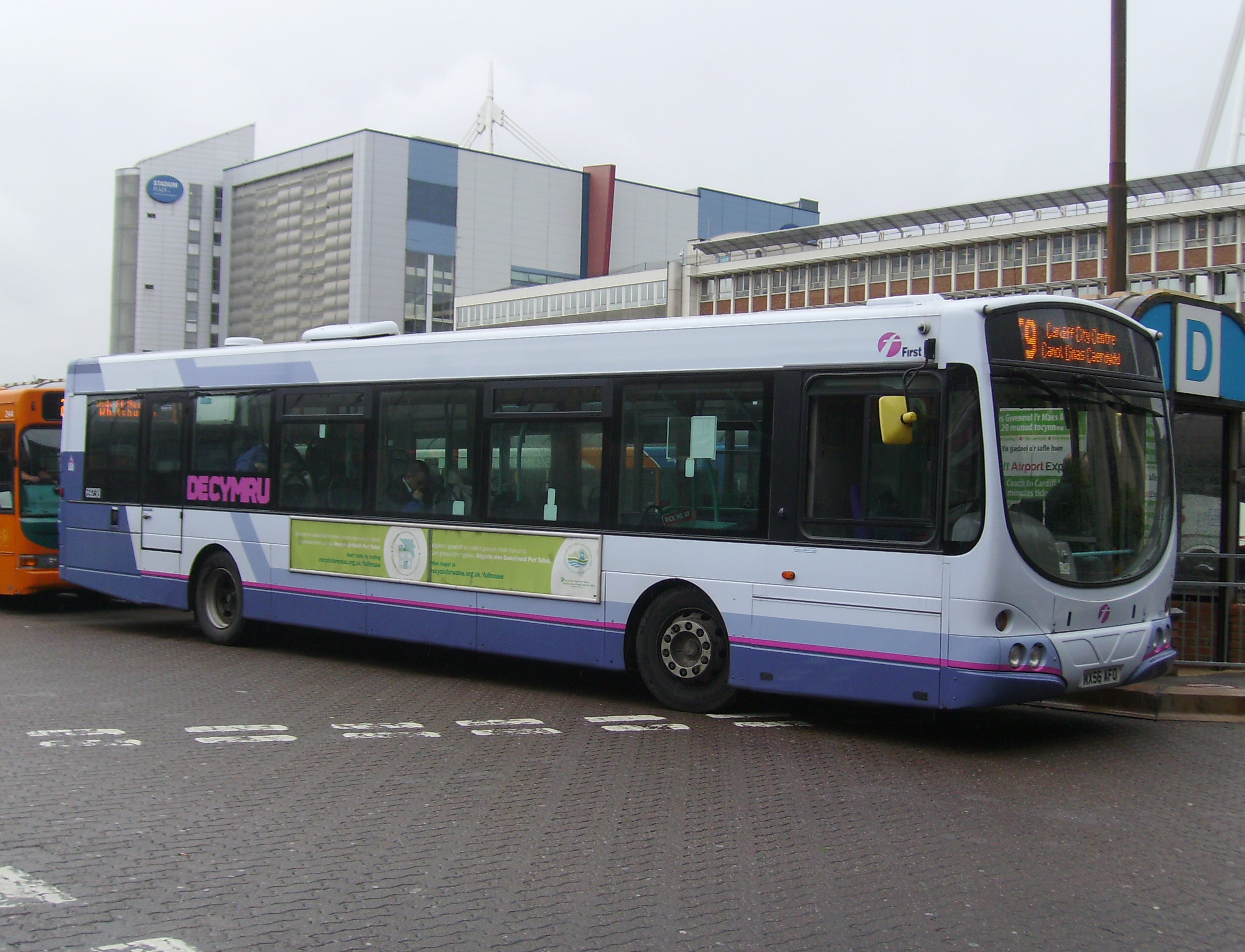
First Cymru bus at the now demolished Cardiff Central bus station

First Cymru, the principal operator in South West Wales, operates inter-urban services west of Cardiff, and three services within the city. They currently operate the TrawsCymru T1C between Cardiff and Aberystwyth in Mid Wales (until April 2018), the X10 Swansea to Cardiff Express (previously called the Greyhound 100) between Cardiff and Swansea, and the Cymru Clipper X2 between Cardiff and Bridgend and Porthcawl.

=== Newport Bus ===
Newport Bus, the principal operator in neighbouring Newport, operates an hourly express service between Cardiff, University Hospital of Wales, and Newport. It also operates a non-express service to and from Newport jointly with Cardiff Bus. Like Cardiff Bus, it is a municipal bus company, owned by Newport City Council.

=== City Sightseeing ===
City Sightseeing operates timetabled open top double-decker bus tours around the city centre and the Bay, including the Millennium Stadium, Cardiff Castle, the Civic Centre, the National Museum of Wales and Alexandra Gardens on the route. The tour takes 50 minutes

=== Adventure Travel ===
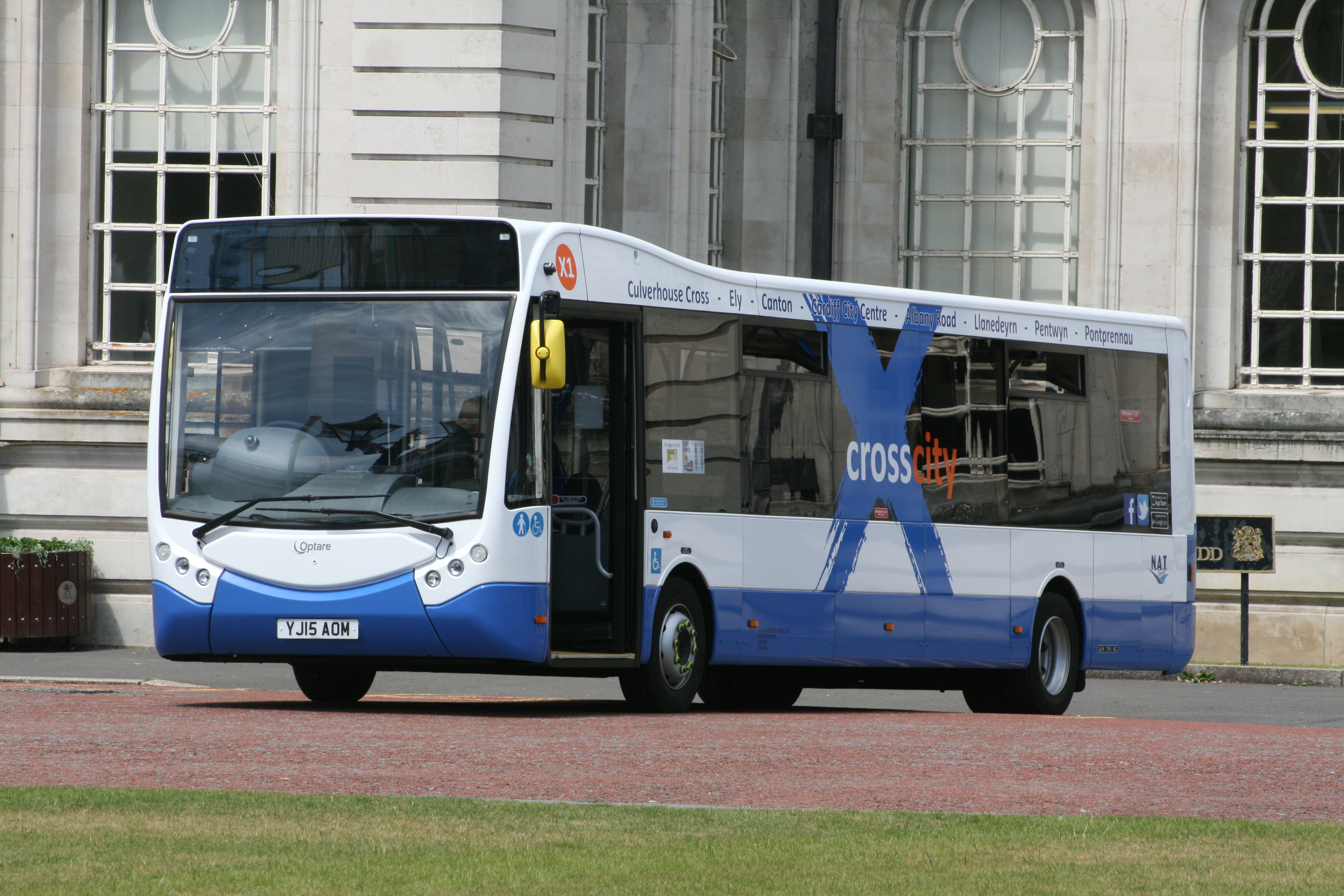
The NAT Group's X1 Crosscity service

Adventure Travel, formerly the NAT Group, operate the X1, X5 and X8 Crosscity services, with the X1 being launched in 2015 which connect the western, central and eastern parts of the city, serving populous areas such as Pentwyn and Llanedeyrn, as well as Canton.

NAT Group updated their services in Cardiff in March 2017; The X11 (no longer operates) had received an extension to Grangetown and Cardiff Bay, and the X8 service was launched connecting Thornhill, Llanishen, Birchgrove, and Maindy to Cardiff City Centre, as well as leading to Cardiff Bay, providing a northern-southern Crosscity service for the capital.

Their latest addition to the Crosscity services was in early September 2017, and it introduced the X5, which now operates between Cardiff City Centre and Newport, serving many new stops in Adamsdown and Trowbridge. They also altered the X11 service's southern terminus, changing the route from the city centre from Cardiff Bay to serve Canton along with the X1, and extending further west to Pentrebane.

They also operate the TrawsCymru T9 Cardiff Airport Express between Cardiff Bay, Cardiff City Centre and Cardiff Airport, until the route was suspended during the COVID-19 pandemic in 2020, the TrawsCymru T1C between Cardiff and Aberystwyth in Mid Wales from April 2018, as well as Service 304 to Barry and some home-school coaches in the Cardiff area. In partnership with Transport for Wales, and the local council, they also operate the G1 Fflecsi route.

=== Edwards ===
Edwards Coaches operates the 400 bus service between Beddau and Greyfriars Road bus stop in Cardiff.

== National operators and services ==
=== National Express ===
Birmingham based National Express has operated |intercity coach services across the United Kingdom since 1972 and sub-contracts to Edwards Coaches the operation of routes from Cardiff to:

- Service 201 and 202 to Gatwick Airport and Heathrow Airport
- Service 320, 322 and 323 to Birmingham
- Service 322 and 509 to London and Brecon
- Service 528 to Birmingham, Swansea, Carmarthen, Tenby, Pembroke and Haverfordwest

=== FlixBus ===
In April 2021, German-owned low-cost coach operator FlixBus launched a twice-daily service connecting Cardiff with Swansea, Bristol and London.

=== TrawsCymru ===
TrawsCymru are a set of routes, set up by the Welsh Government but operated by private bus companies using the TrawsCymru branding. This service is similar to a previous service, TrawsCambria.

Service T1C launched in December 2016 on a six-month trial basis, is operated by First Cymru and connects Cardiff with Carmarthen and Aberystwyth. It is a replacement for the former 701 service that ceased operating in August 2016 when its final operator, Lewis Coaches, ceased trading. Unlike the 701 however, the T1C only operates once a day in and out of Cardiff, does not operate on Sundays, does not stop at Port Talbot and a single deck city bus is used, not coaches.

Service T4 launched in May 2011 and is operated by Stagecoach South Wales. It connects Cardiff with Brecon and Newtown and operates up to 7 times a day.

Service T9, also known as the Cardiff Airport Express, launched in August 2013 and is operated by New Adventure Travel. It connects the centre of Cardiff with Cardiff Airport and operates up to every 20 minutes. When launched, this route was originally operated by First Cymru. It was suspended during the COVID-19 pandemic in 2020 and is yet to be reintroduced.

=== Snap ===
Snap operated an on-demand service that chartered coaches from local operators. It provided services from several pick-up points in and around Cardiff to various cities in England. It stopped operating in March 2020 during the COVID-19 pandemic and announced in August 2021 that it would not be restarting.

== Other bus services ==
=== Bus passes ===
Residents of Cardiff (and Wales) who are over sixty or suffering from certain disabilities, injuries or impediments are entitled to a bus pass enabling free travel across most bus services in Wales. For the Cardiff area, the following buses are exempt from this facility: National Express (including Airport Buses 200, 201 and 202) and Eurolines.

=== Park and ride ===
Park and Ride services run every weekend in Cardiff throughout the year. The cost includes bus travel to the City Centre, usually less than many multi-storey car parks. There are four Park and Ride services in the city:

The Park and Ride services are part of Cardiff council's Sustainable Travel City initiative, which is partly funded by the Welsh Assembly Government. There are plans to extend the number of space from 340 to 1,100 due to its sudden increase in usage.

=== Iff card ===
Iff card is a contactless smart card introduced by Cardiff Bus in October 2010, allowing customers to travel on its services after having pre-paid. The first 30,000 cards were issued free of charge and pre-loaded with £3 of credit, after which the cards will be charged at £5.

An amount of money is electronically loaded onto the card, either upon boarding a bus or at the Cardiff Bus customer service centre. A passenger then chooses a ticket type. The card can also be used as a season ticket. The card should be topped-up when the balance is low, however the card allows the customer to acquire a negative balance up to £3.

The card can be topped-up in units of £1, £2, £3, £4, £5, £10, £15 and £20 up to maximum amount of £50. The card may be used by persons aged between 6 and 60. The Iff card cannot be used to pay a partial amount. The card would be cancelled if not used for a continuous period of one year

== See also ==
- List of bus stations in Wales
- Bus transport in the United Kingdom
- Coach transport in the United Kingdom
- Transport in Cardiff
- Transport in Wales
- Transport in the United Kingdom
