= 2Travel =

Bus and coach operator in South Wales

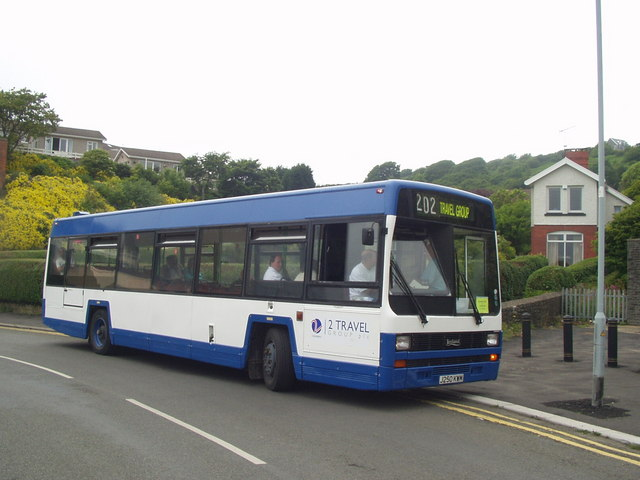
- 2Travel Leyland Lynx operating a free shuttle service for a bus rally in Swansea in July 2003
- Founded: 10 August 1999; 26 years ago
- Ceased operation: June 2005; 20 years ago
- Headquarters: Pentrechwyth, Swansea, Wales
- Service area: Cardiff
- Service type: Bus and coach
- Depots: 4
- Fleet: 74 (January 2003)
- Chief executive: Bev Fowles

2 Travel Group plc, trading as 2Travel, was a bus and coach operating company based in Pentrechwyth, Swansea that ran competitive services across South Wales, predominantly in the cities of Cardiff and Swansea. After being floated on the London Stock Exchange's Alternative Investment Market (AIM) in January 2003, the company entered into a bus war with municipal bus company Cardiff Bus, which eventually resulted in 2Travel falling into liquidation during June 2005.

== History ==
2Travel was first established on 10 August 1999 as Filbuk 583 Limited by former First Cityline managing director Bev Fowles and solicitor Huw Francis, later changing its name to 2 Travel Coaches Ltd on 10 April 2000. During 2000, 2Travel acquired the operations of independent coach firm Capital Coaches, gaining two depots that had been leased to Capital Coaches in Cwmbran and Swansea, as well as engineering company Morris Brothers.

From late 2002, 2Travel began running a number of minor contract services in Cardiff, including school bus services as well as shuttle services to and from the Millennium Stadium for the 2003 FA Cup final, among other fixtures. 2Travel also began to operate a limited number of local bus services, categorised as 'in-fill' services due to only operating between the running of morning and afternoon school contract services, in Neath and Swansea, funded with subsidy from local authorities such as the Vale of Glamorgan Council.

On 20 January 2003, 2Travel was listed on the Alternative Investment Market of the London Stock Exchange as the 2 Travel Group, trading 7p in shares with a market capitalisation of £2.768 million. Later in May 2003, following the acquisitions of Cardiff independent Coach Travel Centre and Swansea independent Glan Harris Coaches as well as gaining a three-year contract to be the coach provider for the Wales national rugby union team, 2Travel announced it was to rebuild its Pentrechwyth headquarters for £2 million, negotiating offers to stay at Pentrechwyth or build a new site in Neath Port Talbot.

=== Cardiff bus war and demise ===
From 19 April 2004, 2Travel began running four 'in-fill' services which connected Cardiff city centre with the suburbs of Llanrumney, St Mellons, Pentrebane and Ely, with additional intention to run a fifth service serving Pentwyn; this service was never operated due to a lack of driving staff. In response, Cardiff Bus, a municipal bus company owned by Cardiff City Council, set up the 'no frills' White Service, using a fleet of 13 minibuses procured from the Cardiff Bus fleet and painted in an all-white livery. Cardiff Bus' White Service buses ran to the same destinations as 2Travel's 'in-fill' services despite the operator already running 'liveried' routes to these destinations. Almost immediately from the commencement of operations, 2Travel became engaged in a 'bus war' with Cardiff Bus, with the White Service, found to be departing from stops within minutes of 2Travel's services, undercutting the fares of 2Travel by 9.3%. This resulted in the overall loss of 41,225 passengers by 2Travel to Cardiff Bus between April and December 2004, representing lost potential revenue of £33,818.79.

In July 2004, 2Travel's directors were ordered to attend a public inquiry, held on 16 and 17 August, which investigated the company's bus monitoring, maintenance and financial standing. The inquiry concluded with 2Travel's operating licence being reduced by ten buses until the end of September, with the Traffic Commissioner finding that, over the course of two years, 33 buses in the 2Travel fleet had been served prohibition notices due to high levels of vandalism. Services observed running from Neath depot in October 2003 were noted as either failing to operate, running early or late, or running with improper destination displays, and the company was also noted as having issues retaining bus drivers, resulting in the hiring of former gurkhas from Hong Kong.

2Travel closed its depot in Cardiff on 17 December. The company's coach depot in Cwmbran, housing around 40 buses and coaches and additionally responsible for some of the area's bus services, was closed with immediate effect on the same day, resulting in 40 staff working at the depot being made redundant.

At a hearing on 24 December, 2Travel's operating license was ordered to be revoked by the Traffic Commissioner from 22 January 2005 after failing to satisfy the requirement of appropriate financial standing. On 30 December, the 2Travel Group's listing was suspended from the AIM. 2Travel announced it would make an appeal against the decision of the Traffic Commissioner to the Traffic Tribunal, thereby suspending the license revocation, and on 10 March 2005, the decision to revoke 2Travel's license was overruled, with 2Travel again referred to the Traffic Commissioner for them to determine whether financial standing requirements had been met by the operator.

By June 2005, however, 2Travel had additionally ceased operations from its Llanelli and Swansea garages and entered into liquidation.

=== Post-liquidation ===
In May 2007, the Office of Fair Trading released a provisional report stating that Cardiff Bus had engaged in 'predatory behaviour' and therefore may have infringed competition law under the terms of the Competition Act 1998. The OFT claimed that Cardiff Bus had deliberately ran loss-making services between April 2004 and February 2005 that made it impossible for 2Travel to remain in the Cardiff bus operating market, withdrawing them when 2Travel withdrew its Cardiff services. In response to the provisional OFT report, 2Travel announced it was planning to make a civil claim against Cardiff Bus if the OFT found them guilty of using illegal tactics. On 19 November 2008, Cardiff Bus was found guilty by the OFT of using 'predatory conduct' against 2Travel, enabling the latter to start legal proceedings.

In the years leading to his retirement, 2Travel CEO Bev Fowles eventually returned to bus operations from December 2008 as the owner of Neath independent South Wales Transport, named after the former National Bus Company operator of the same name.

=== Competition Appeal Tribunal ruling ===
In January 2011, 2Travel's directors announced it was launching legal action against Cardiff Bus, seeking damages of £50 million of public money for lost profits and the resultant failure of 2Travel. This damages claim, first heard on 23 March 2012, was later amended to include the further loss of commercial opportunity to redevelop 2Travel's Swansea headquarters, but was later lowered to a total £20 million.

On 5 July 2012, Cardiff Bus was ordered to pay £93,818 in compensation to the 2Travel's directors for using illegal tactics to force 2Travel out of the bus operating market. As a result, Cardiff Bus managing director David Brown resigned the following day.
