= Bus Vannin =

Bus service on the Isle of Man

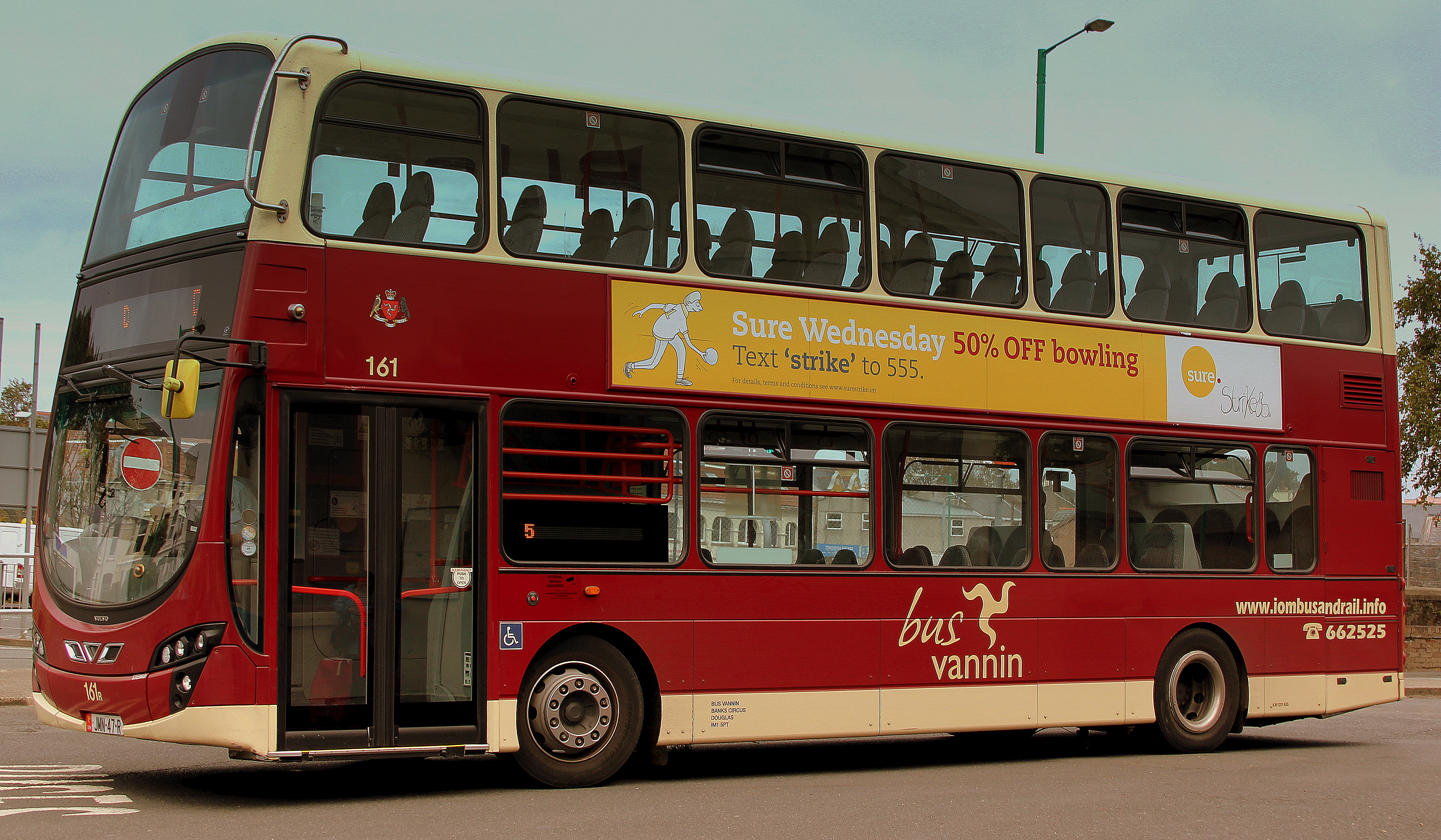
- A Bus Vannin Wright Eclipse Gemini 2-bodied Volvo B9TL in 2014
- Parent: Department of Infrastructure
- Founded: October 1976; 49 years ago
- Headquarters: Douglas
- Service area: Isle of Man
- Service type: Bus services
- Hubs: Banks Circus, Port Erin & Ramsey
- Stations: Douglas, Port Erin & Ramsey
- Fleet: 67 (January 2015)
- Website: www.iombusandrail.im

Bus Vannin - styled as bus vannin - is the government-owned and operated bus service on the Isle of Man. The name was adopted in June 2009 to replace Isle of Man Transport. The company was founded on 1 October 1976, as National Transport, which was an amalgamation of two other operating companies.

== History ==
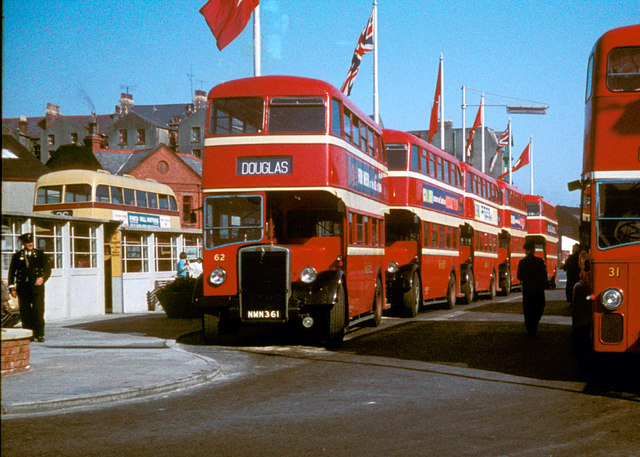
Lord Street bus station in 1961

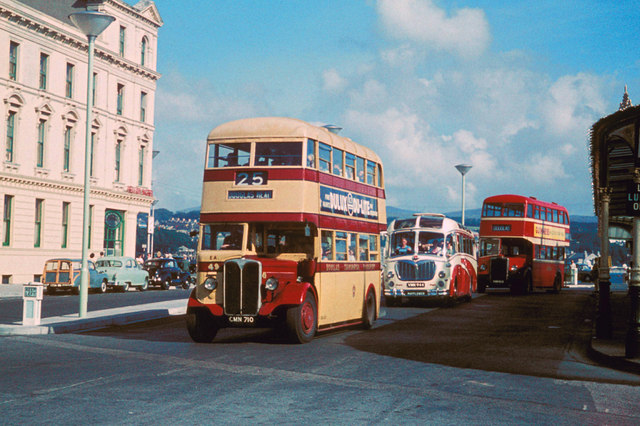
Douglas Corporation Northern Counties bodied AEC Regent III in April 1961

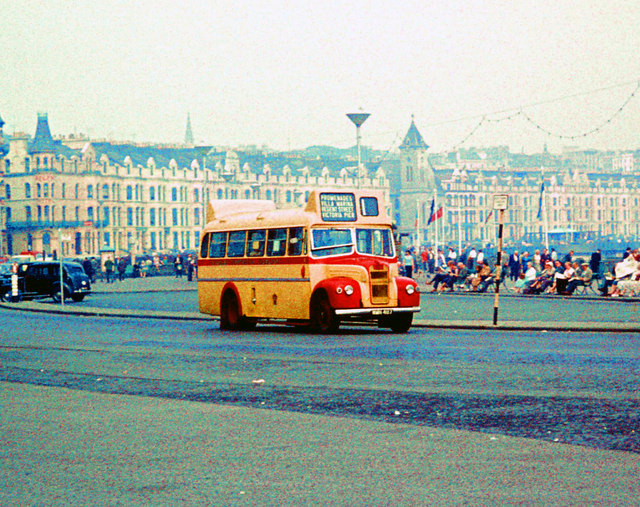
Douglas Corporation Guy Otter in September 1961

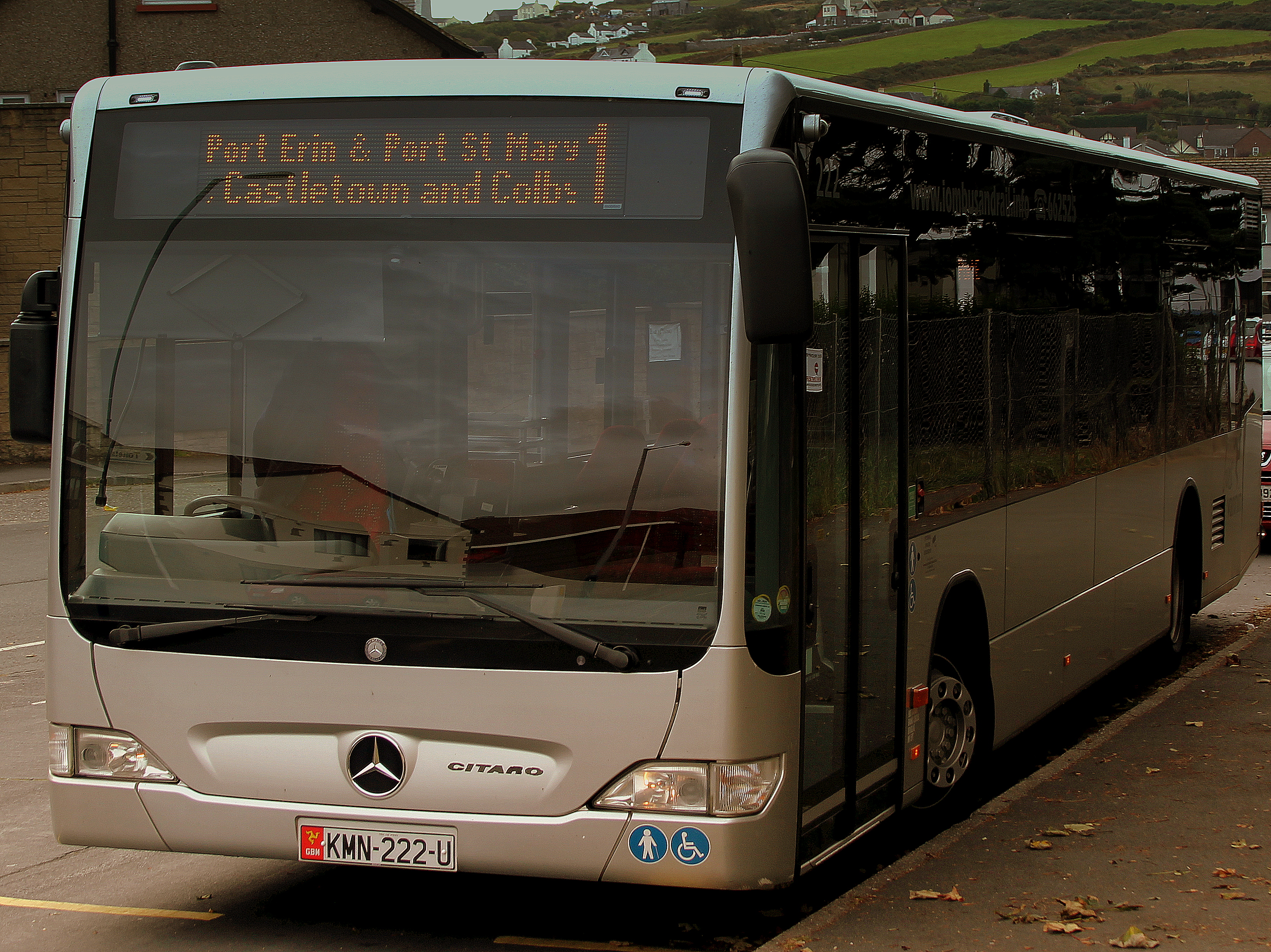
Mercedes-Benz Citaro at Port Erin in September 2014

The first omnibus services on the island were provided by the Manxland Bus Co Limited, in addition to several smaller operators which operated independently. The primary means of longer-distance travel were the Isle of Man Railway to the west, south and north (via the west side of the island) and the Manx Electric Railway on the east coast.

When bus competition became a threat to the Isle of Man Railway, it bought out the bus company and operated it as Isle of Man Road Services in conjunction with the railway. In addition to the island-wide services, Douglas Corporation also operated a fleet of buses around the capital, distinctive by their yellow livery. As the railway company began to falter, it relied more heavily on the bus operation, and when the railway lines closed for the first time in 1965 the bus services were intensified to replace the rail services.

The vehicles of Road Services carried an all-over red livery with two off-white bands, and the Railway Company crest was modified to include a facsimile of a bus instead of a railway locomotive. The buses of Douglas Corporation, which only operated within the borough, carried an all-over yellow livery with two red bands and corporation crest.

Both operators used the bus station on Lord Street in Douglas as their base. Today, this site has been given over to a car park, whilst buses use roadside lay-bys on Lord Street itself. The two companies operated services independently from this site until the operations began to falter in the early 1970s at which time government intervention was required to ensure continued operation.

=== Nationalisation ===
When the service was bought by the Isle of Man government in 1976 the buses carried National Transport logos and a new livery, predominantly of red with white trim, having previously carried a variation of this colour scheme under the Road Services banner. The publicly-owned service used many second-hand vehicles from the United Kingdom and Ireland, a practice which continued until relatively recently, from a variety of sources including Liverpool Corporation, Preston Borough Transport and Ribble Motor Services. Such vehicle types included Leyland Atlanteans from Merseyside PTE, Portsmouth City Transport, SELNEC and Tyne & Wear PTE, Leyland Olympians from Devon General, Dublin Bus and Stagecoach, and Leyland Lynxes from Halton Transport.

By 1987, when a new management scheme was under way, a revised livery of cream and red was introduced, and Isle of Man Transport adopted as the title, using a similar design motif to all the island's government departments including a triskelion motif. During this period the buses carried a variety of advertisements along their side panels, with several distinctive buses carrying all-over advertising for local businesses including the Gaiety Theatre, Lombard Bank, Curraghs Wildlife Park and the National Coal Board.

A further change of leadership in 1999 saw the introduction of brand-new buses and gradual phasing out of older stock, latterly used only on school services, and the advertising policy changed resulting in no advertisements appearing at all. By 2009 a further change of policy resulted in the reintroduction of advertisements which has proved popular, with local radio stations, estate agents, travel agents and cinemas taking advantage of the new schemes.

== Branding ==
The government-owned bus service on the island came into being in 1976 as National Transport, taking over from both the Road Services (a subsidiary of the Isle of Man Railway Company) and Douglas Corporation Transport, operated by the municipal authority. The vehicles were liveried in an all-over red colour scheme, later changed to include wide white banding; although with the fleet consisting of a wide selection of different second hand vehicles the uniform appearance was not successful. By 1987 the white banding had become cream in colour, and the full Isle of Man Transport name was added to all vehicles. During the period up to 1997 advertising panels were carried on the sides of some vehicles, and, in certain cases, all-over advertising was used (see above).

In April 2009, eleven new Wright Eclipse Gemini 2 bodied Volvo B9TLs were added to the fleet, carrying a maroon and cream livery with the Bus Vannin branding which is now used in all literature and timetabling information. Not all of the fleet carries this new livery, however the Wright StreetLites that entered service in 2010 were delivered in the new livery although the overall colour scheme is largely cream with some maroon detailing, the opposite of the 2009 deliveries.

In 2010 Hullad Oie (Night Owl) late night services were introduced into the timetable; they operate at weekends into the early hours, serving the satellite towns from Douglas departing at about midnight. Totems at bus stops are in the process of being updated to the new maroon scheme. Text also appears in Manx Gaelic on these, and digital destination displays on the vehicles also have an option to show the place names in the language as well.

Between 2011 and 2013, thirty Mercedes-Benz Citaro LE single deckers were delivered; these are presented in a silver-grey livery with Bus Vannin decals - this being the new standard livery for all buses in the Bus Vannin fleet.

The bus service continues to be operated by the government but is now more clearly segregated from the railways, which are now called Isle of Man Heritage Railways though they remain managed by the same group.

== Operations ==
=== Bus stations ===
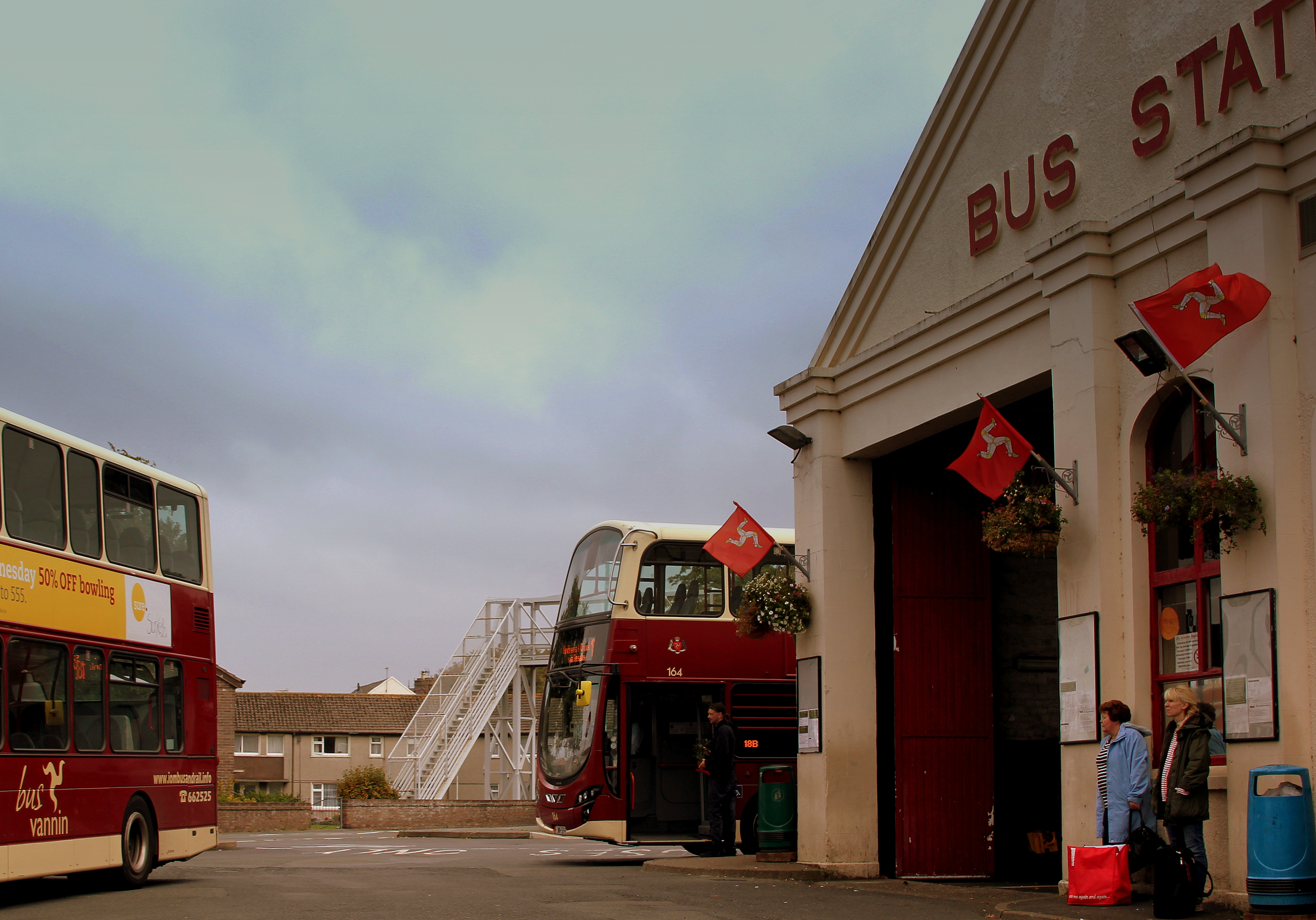
Ramsey Bus Station in September 2014

There are three bus depots on the island which provide passenger facilities and storage areas for off-duty buses. At Port Erin and at Ramsey, these are combined at one location, while in Douglas the Banks Circus site has a workshop and bus yard, with no passenger facilities. The passenger facilities provided at all the bus stations are limited, and some facilities are only open at certain times of the day.

- Douglas (Lord Street): shelters only
- Port Erin (Station Road): toilets, waiting area
- Ramsey (Princes Road): toilets, waiting room

=== Depots ===
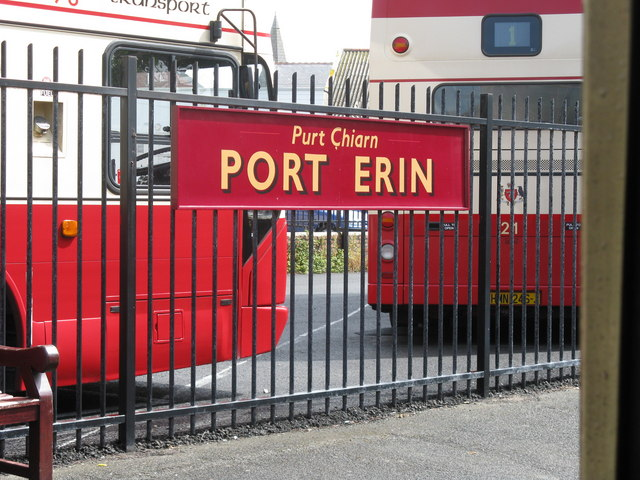
Port Erin depot in July 2009

In the past there was a depot in Laxey, the site later being occupied by Princes Motors and vehicle storage yards are also located next to the depots at Port Erin and Ramsey. A depot in Peel closed in 2010. The garage and facilities in Ramsey were taken over from the original Manxland Omnibus Company, and have remained in bus company ownership ever since.

The yard at Port Erin is on the site of former railway platforms whilst the original garage now houses the Port Erin Railway Museum which opened in 1975; the current garage was built as a replacement the following year and remains open today.

- Douglas (Banks Circus)
- Port Erin (Station Road)
- Ramsey (Princes Road)

== Routes ==
A wide range of routes are operated by Bus Vannin. Many of them are operated on a regular daily timetable, such as routes from Douglas to the other towns on the island and also local services around Douglas and Onchan. There are some routes however which are operated less frequently on certain days of the week to smaller villages around the island.

Late night bus services were introduced to the island in September 2009 and are known as Hullad Oie, Manx for "night owl". The three routes (N1, N3, N5) depart Lord Street in the capital of Douglas on Fri and Sat nights at 00:15 and 01:15 serving the towns of Port St Mary, Ramsey and Peel. The single fare on a Hullad Oie Night Owl service is double the normal adult fare for the journey undertaken (e.g. the normal Douglas to Peel fare per person is £2.70, whereas the fare on Hullad Oie is £5.40). These fare conditions apply to any journeys departing after midnight. Over the Christmas 2020 period the Hullad Oie Night Owl services operated Friday and Saturday evenings from 4 to 19 December departing from Douglas at the usual times. In March 2021 the services were paused for period during a COVID-19 lockdown.

In 2022, service frequencies had to be reduced due to driver shortages.

Most bus routes frequently have letters affixed to the main number to signify an alteration in the main route. For example, routes 1h, 21h, 22h and 25h are all variations of their original routes that terminate at Nobles Hospital. Private hire or school buses are reserved with numbers 30-99.

#	Timetable Colour	Primary Route	Variations
1	Red	Nobles Hospital - Douglas - Ronaldsway Airport - Castletown - Port Erin	1a, 1h, N1, TT1*
2	Red	Ballachrink - Douglas - Ronaldsway Airport - Castletown - Port Erin	2a
3	Pink	Douglas - Laxey - Ramsey	3a, N3, TT3*, X3
4	Blue	Douglas - Foxdale - St. Johns - Peel - Nirabyl	4b, 4n
5	Purple	Douglas - Nobles Hospital - St. Johns - Peel - Kirk Michael - Ramsey	5a, 5c, 5j, N5
6	Purple	Douglas - St. Johns - Peel	6a, 6c, 6f, N6c*, TT6*
8	Lime	Peel - St. Johns - Ronaldsway Airport - Castletown - Port Erin - Sound	8s
11	Red	Wilaston - Douglas - Ronaldsway Airport - Castletown - Port Erin	11a
12	Red	Wilaston - Douglas - Ronaldsway Airport - Castletown - Port Erin	12a
14	Blue	Douglas - Foxdale - Castletown	14b, 14c
15	Blue	Douglas - Onchan	15b
16	Turquoise	Ramsey - Maughold	16b, 16d
17k	Orange	Ramsey - Jurby	
18a	Orange	Ramsey - Jurby	18k
19	Purple	Ramsey - Jurby	19c
20	Dark Blue	Ramsey - Jurby	20a
21	Gold	Douglas - Farmhill	21b, 21h
22	Green	Douglas - Onchan - Nobles Hospital	22a, 22h, 22k*, 22v*
25	Green	Douglas - Onchan	25b, 25h
29	Gold	Douglas - Port Soderick	

*TT services only

== Ticketing and fares ==
Rail tickets purchased for the Isle of Man Railway between Douglas and Port Erin and also those for the Manx Electric Railway between Douglas and Ramsey are valid on buses. Bus tickets, however, are not valid on the heritage railways.

The latest timetable update was released in April 2019.

Current (April 2019) ticket options are:

1. The Short Hop fare is for journeys of up to three stops in towns. These are bought on the vehicle.

2. On-bus cash fares for longer journeys vary according to distance travelled. Examples are: Douglas to Peel £2.70; Douglas to Port Erin £3.40; Port St. Mary - Port Erin £1.30

3. Go Places Cards are smartcard tickets offering discounted travel for 6 or 12 journeys at the same fare. Available at offices and railway stations

4. Go Cards are also smartcard-based and offer 1, 3, 5 or 7 days' unlimited bus travel. A one-day Go Card (paper ticket) is available on-bus from drivers. One day tickets cost £7, 3 days cost £16 five days £19 and seven days £23. As the most expensive single journey on the island costs £6.80 (Onchan to Port Erin and back) the one-day ticket offers a saving as soon as a third journey is made. Go Easy cards are similar and offer 28 days travel for £80

5. Go Explore tickets are another smartcard product that entitle the holder to unlimited travel on scheduled services on all of the island's transport network (bus and rail) except for the Manx Express bus service (Douglas-Ramsey via Mountain Road). They are available for 1,3,5 or 7 consecutive days. Child and family versions are available. A one day Go Explore paper ticket is available from bus drivers, cost £17.

6. For school students, Go School cards are available, with journeys costing 40p each .

Child fares apply between 5 and 15 years old, or for those between 16 and 19 still in full-time education and in possession of a school card.

The Heritage Explorer ticket, like the Go Explore ticket, offers unlimited travel on scheduled bus services (except Manx Express buses), Isle of Man Steam Railway, Manx Electric Railway, Snaefell Mountain Railway, and Douglas Horse Trams. This ticket, like the other Explorer tickets, gives a child (5 to 15 years) free travel with an accompanying adult, and their ticket. The ticket also entitles the holder free admission to all Manx National Heritage sites.

The Isle of Man Green Party supports making bus travel free, saying it would enable "low-income earners to access more job and training opportunities across the Isle of Man".

== Fleet ==
As of June 2017, the fleet consisted of 69 vehicles.
