= Iff card =

Bus service smart card in Cardiff, Wales

Iff Card
- Location: Cardiff; Vale of Glamorgan
- Launched: 6 October 2010
- Discontinued: 29 November 2025
- Technology: Contactless smart card
- Currency: GBP (£50 maximum load)
- Validity: Cardiff Bus
- Retailed: Bus services; Customer Service centre
- Website: Iff Card

Iff card was a contactless smart card introduced in Cardiff in 2010. It allows customers to travel on Cardiff Bus services after having pre-paid.

The name "Iff card" is a play on the word "Cardiff".

== Launch ==
Having been an aspiration of Cardiff Bus for many years beforehand, the card was launched in October 2010 during a publicity event outside Cardiff Central Library. The first 30,000 cards were issued free of charge and pre-loaded with £3 of credit, after which the cards were charged at £5. The cards are now issued free.

The company spent £300,000 on developing the card whose ITSO technology can be shared with other transport providers and public bodies in the future.

More than 25,000 applications for the card were received within the first few weeks of its launch.

== Use ==
An amount of money is electronically loaded onto the card, either upon boarding a bus or at the Cardiff Bus customer service centre. A passenger then chooses a ticket type. The card can also be used as a season ticket. The card should be topped up when the balance is low, but the card allows the customer to acquire a negative balance up to £3, the first operator in the UK to do so.

Those who have registered for an Iff card will be able to be sent service updates via text or e-mail during spells of bad weather.

== Restrictions ==
The card can be topped-up in units of £5, £10 and £20 up to maximum amount of £50. The card may be used by persons aged between 6 and 60. The Iff card cannot be used to pay a partial amount. The card would be cancelled if not used for a continuous period of one year.

== Future ==
The managing director of Cardiff Bus hoped the online topping up service would be available by 2011. Executive Member for Cardiff Council hopes the card would become integrated with rail companies so it could be used across all transport systems. Deputy First Minister for Wales, Ieuan Wyn Jones hopes to see the smartcard technology rolled out throughout Wales by 2014. Cardiff Bus confirmed that the Iff Card would no longer be supported after 29 November 2025, encouraging users to purchase tickets through the Cardiff Bus app and by contactless cards instead.
