= Leyland Lynx =

Step-entrance integral single-deck bus

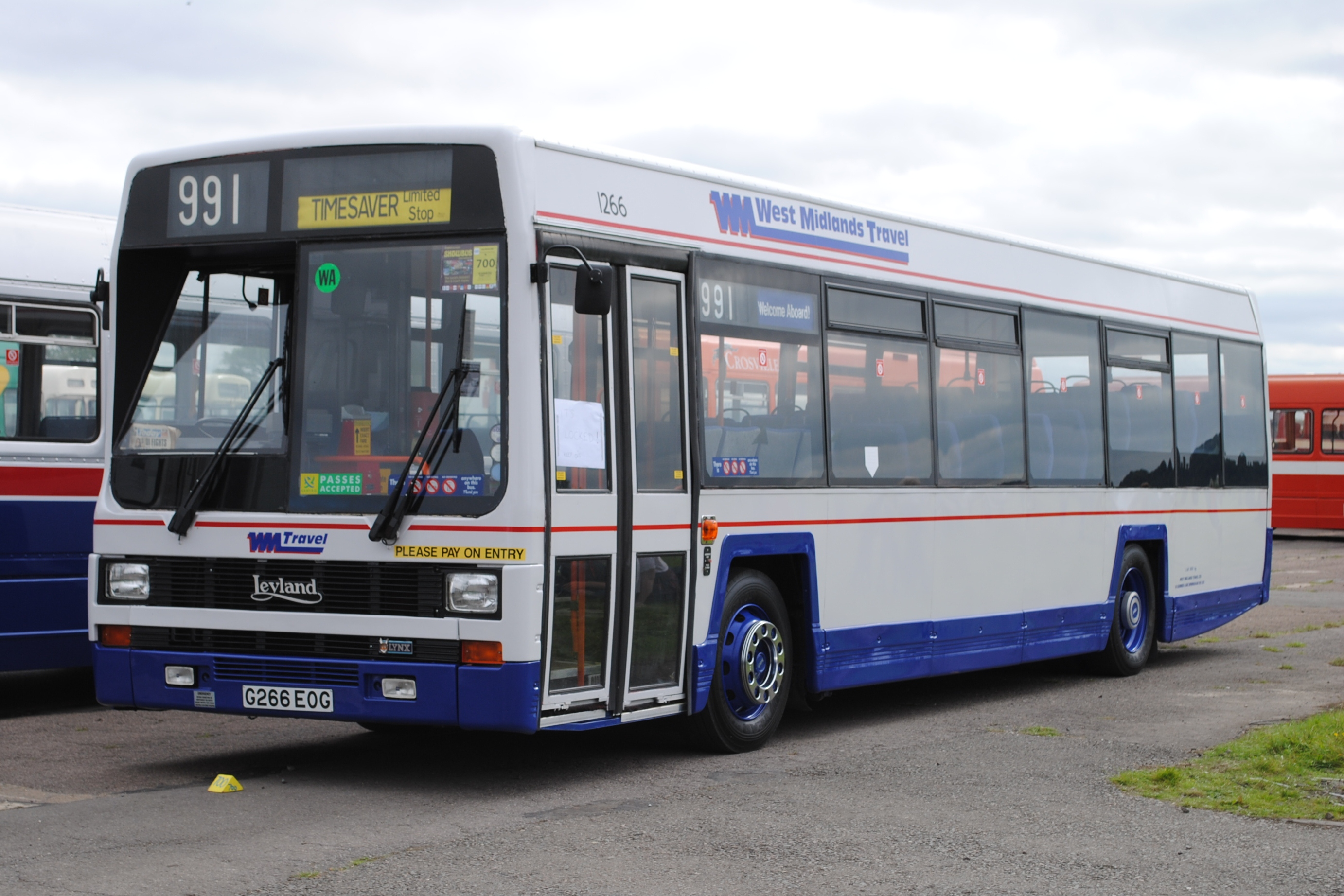
- Preserved West Midlands Travel Leyland Lynx at Showbus 2013 at Long Marston Airfield

Overview
- Manufacturer: Leyland Bus
- Production: 1986–1992
- Assembly: Workington, Cumbria, England

Body and chassis
- Doors: 1 or 2
- Floor type: Step entrance

Powertrain
- Engine: Leyland TL11; Gardner 6HLXCT; Cummins L10 (Lynx II); Volvo THD102KF (Lynx II)
- Capacity: 29 to 52 seated
- Transmission: Leyland Hydracyclic four-speed semi-automatic ZF Ecomat four-speed automatic (Lynx II)

Dimensions
- Length: 11.0–12.0 metres (36.1–39.4 ft)
- Width: 2.5 metres (8 ft 2 in)
- Height: 3.2 metres (10 ft)

Chronology
- Predecessor: Leyland National
- Successor: Volvo B10B

The Leyland Lynx is a step-entrance integral single-deck bus manufactured by Leyland Bus in Workington, England between 1986 and 1992.

== Design ==
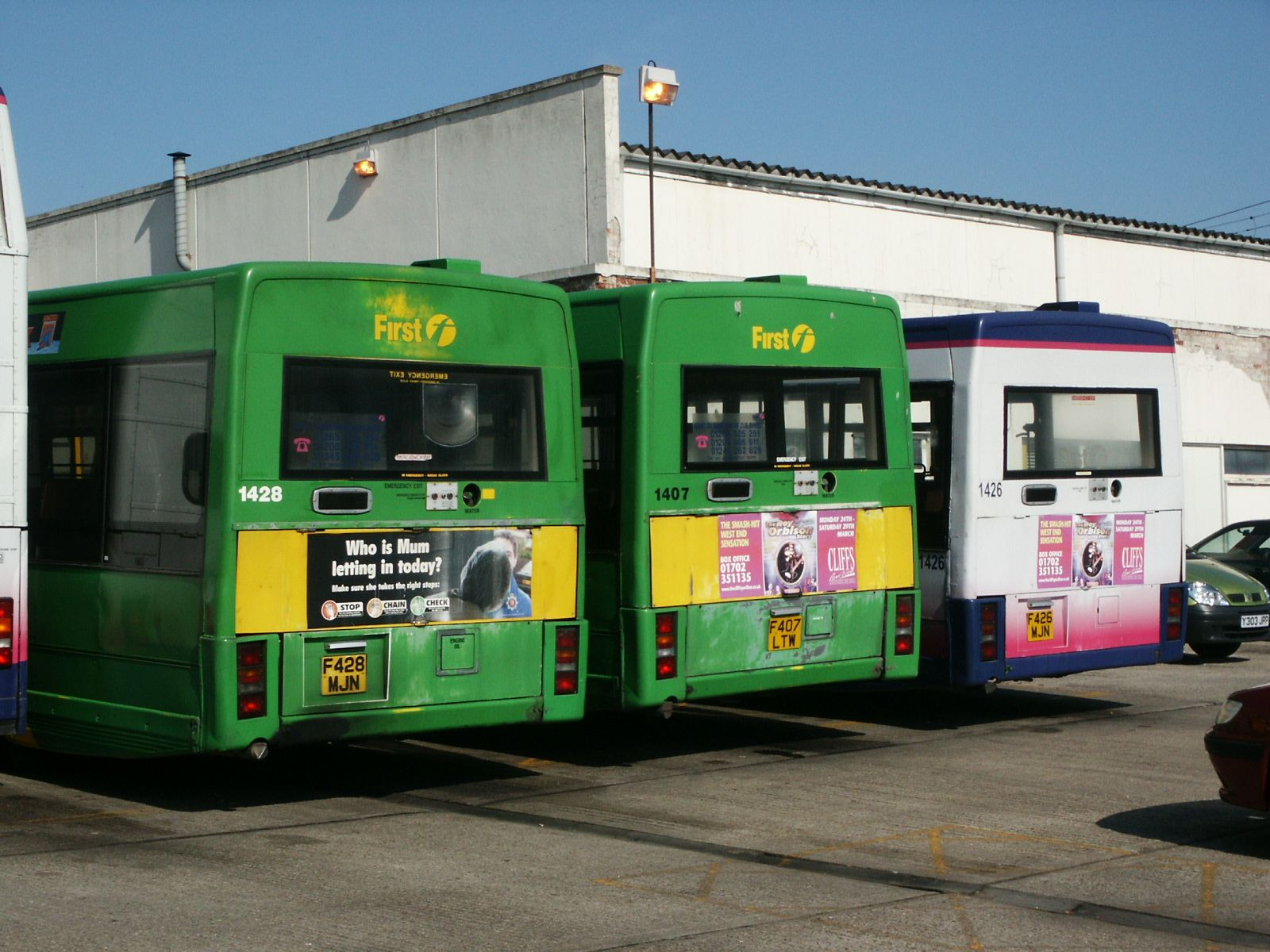
Rear of three First Eastern National Lynxes in March 2003

Internally marketed as the B60, Leyland Bus revealed the Lynx chassis in 1984 as a replacement for the ageing Leyland National integral, with the chassis assembled for a short time alongside the National at Leyland's Workington factory until the National's 1985 discontinuation. Initially marketed as an export product until the home UK market recovered from bus deregulation in 1986, the B60 Lynx featured a welded steel underframe with a floor height of 500 mm (20 in) at the front of the chassis to 900 mm (35 in) at the rear. An air springed trailing-arm suspension was fitted to both axles, and a four-speed automatic Leyland Hydracyclic gearbox with an integral retarder was equipped as standard. Engines offered were the Leyland TL11, the Gardner 6HLXCT and the Cummins L10.

The Lynx was launched a year later as a complete 11.18 metres (36.7 ft) single-deck city bus with Leyland-built bodywork at the 1985 International Bus & Coach Exhibition at the Earls Court Exhibition Centre. The Lynx body was a largely squared design factoring in previous operator feedback from the National and other Leyland Bus products, mainly through making use of bonded window glazing with no curved glass as well as two separate windscreens, with the driver's windscreen notably being raked back to reduce glare; a plan for offering a single-piece flat windscreen was considered but was not carried out. Internally, the Lynx featured a split step entrance, with Leyland additionally offering the option of a floor with a step in the middle or one that gently ramped from the front of the bus towards the rear. Provision was also made in the design process for the Lynx to be assembled as both a double-decker bus and articulated bus chassis, however none were ever produced.

Although the B60 was the first bus to carry the Lynx brand, British Leyland had previously used the brand for a truck chassis produced between 1936 and 1940, reviving the name for a new model produced between 1968 and 1979. The Lynx name has since been revived again by Ashok Leyland for use as a midibus.

=== Lynx II ===
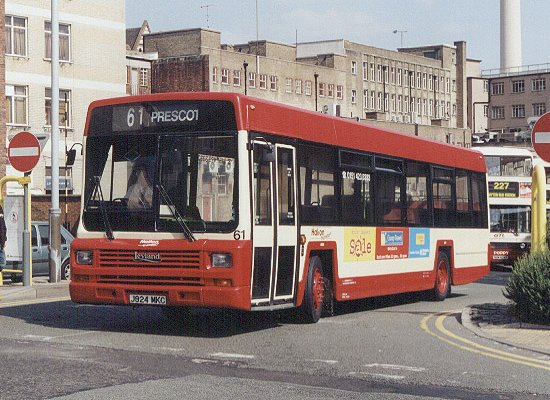
Halton Transport Leyland Lynx II in Liverpool

In 1990, the updated Lynx II was introduced. Featuring a restyled front fascia with a protruding grille panels and headlights, as a result of the takeover of Leyland by Volvo in March 1988, the Lynx II could additionally be specified with either Volvo's THD102KF or Cummins' L10 engines, drastically reducing performance in pursuit of more environmentally friendly engines, and was equipped with a ZF Ecomat four-speed automatic as standard. Complaints about ride quality were addressed with the fitting of a softer front air suspension equipped with shock absorbers.

Internally, the Lynx II was built with accessible features compliant to the suggested specifications of the Disabled Persons Transport Advisory Committee (DIPTAC), including a single 305 mm (12.0 in) entrance step replacing the split-step arrangement, a non-slip PVC floor and painted handrails. Other improvements to the interior included the rearmost seats being one 'bench' as opposed to being split into two, textured laminate walls, rear platforms raised by 80 mm (3.1 in) to omit the inclusion of a further rear step and improved soundproofing.

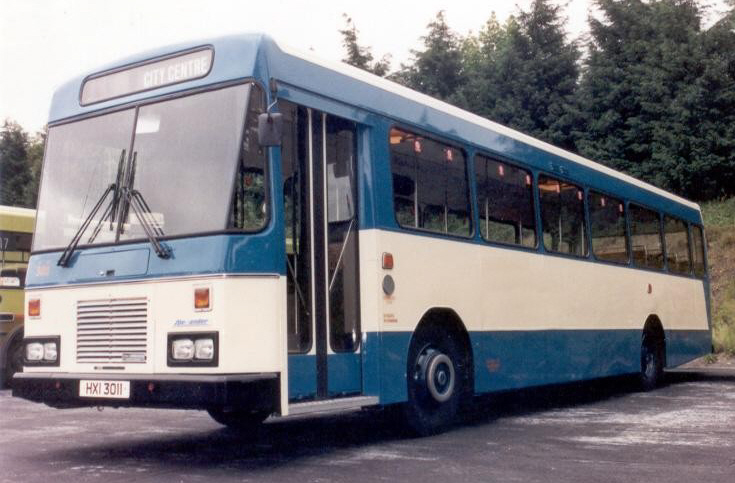
Ulsterbus Alexander N-Type bodied Leyland Lynx

Like the earlier Lynx, the Lynx II was also made available as a underframe for other coachbuilders to body. Although the large majority of Lynxes carried the Leyland body, seven chassis were bodied by Walter Alexander (Belfast) with N-Type bodywork for Citybus of Belfast, including the first prototype. Northern Counties also catalogued bodies for the Lynx but none were built.

The Lynx was discontinued with Volvo's closure of Leyland's Workington factory in 1992. The last two Lynxes produced entered service with Halton Transport in August 1992, eventually being replaced in Volvo's product lineup by a variant of the Volvo B10B launched specifically for the UK bus market.

== Operators ==
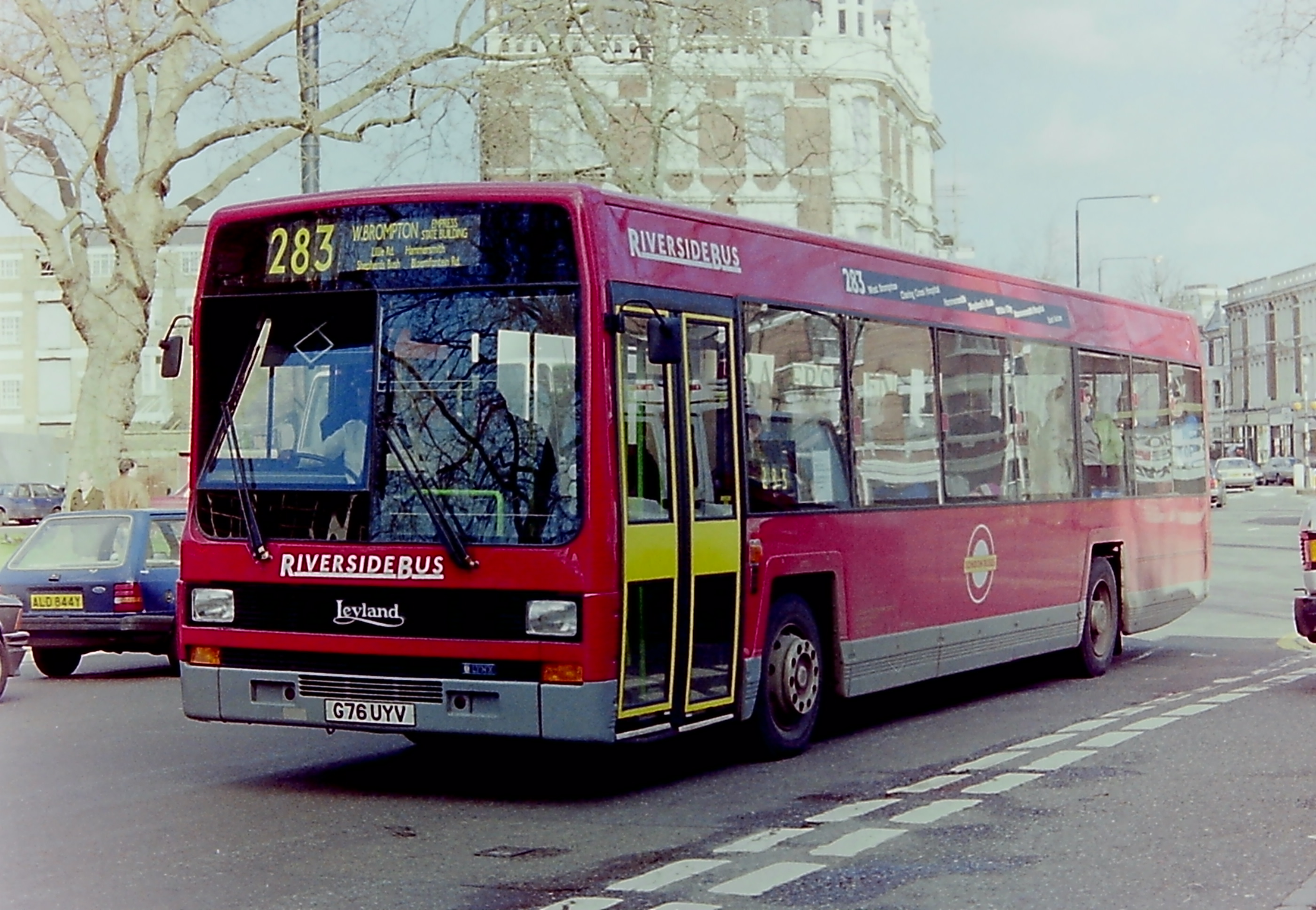
LRT London United Leyland Lynx in Hammersmith on route 283 in February 1990

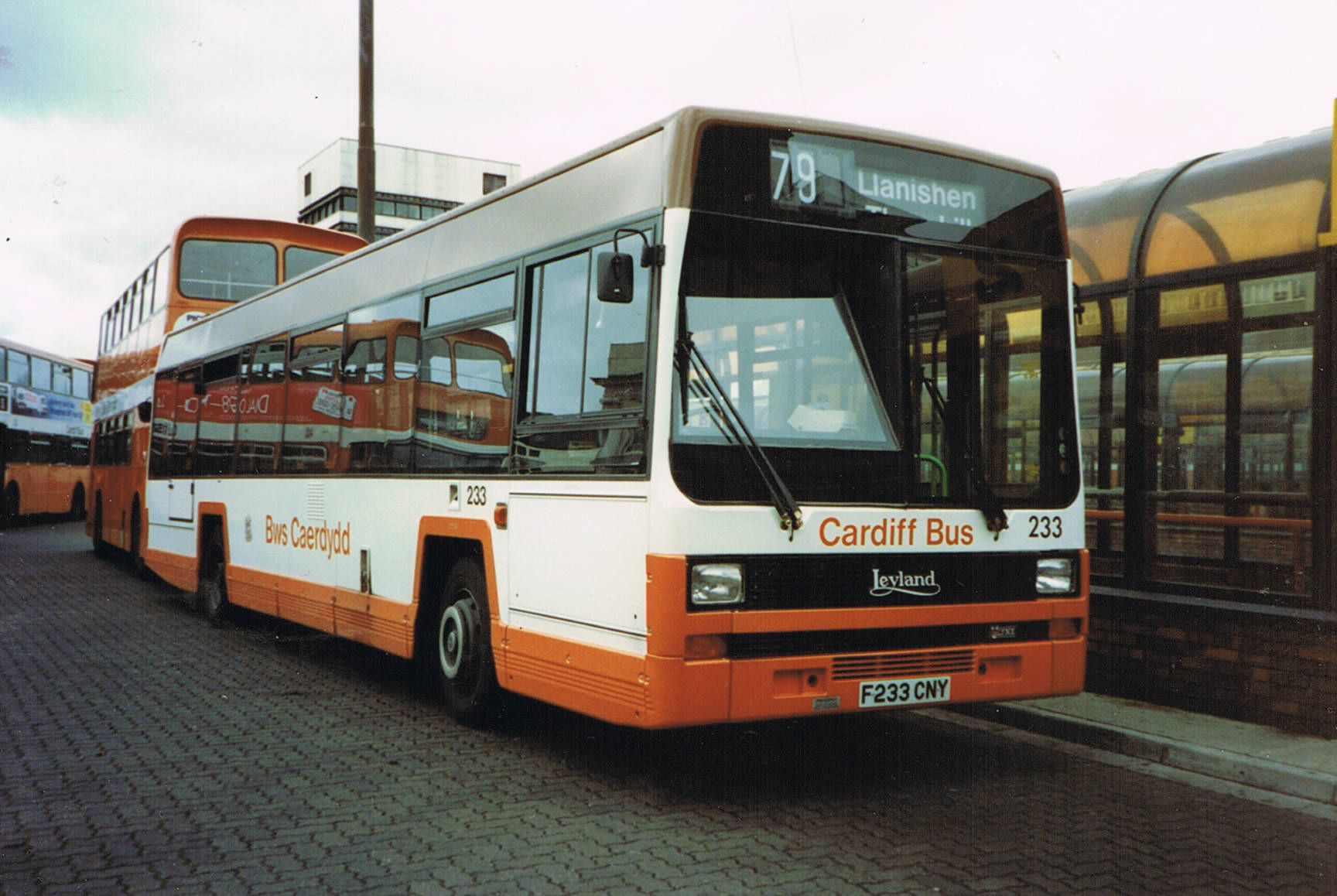
Cardiff Bus Leyland Lynx at Cardiff Central bus station

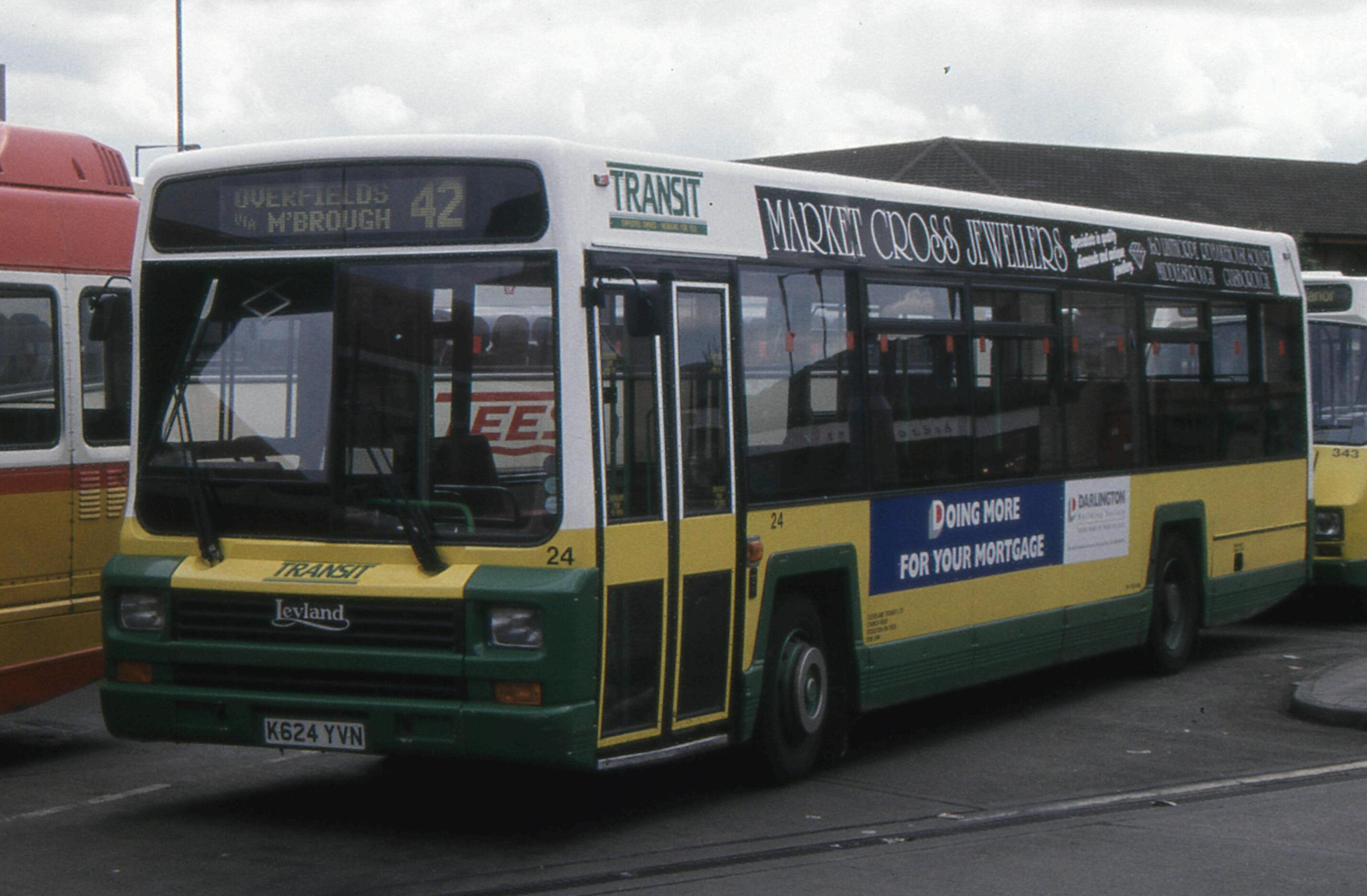
Cleveland Transit Leyland Lynx II in Middlesbrough in May 1994

The largest operator of Leyland Lynxes in the United Kingdom was West Midlands Travel (WMT), whose order for 250 Lynxes for delivery between 1989 and 1990 was the UK's largest order for single-deck buses since 1977; 155 Lynxes delivered from this order up to early 1990 were returned to Leyland Bus to rectify faults relating to fuel supply, radiators and windscreens falling out of their mountings, with the remaining 95 receiving modifications prior to delivery to WMT. Six demonstrators specified with Gardner engines and semi-automatic Leyland Hydracyclic gearboxes were also delivered to the West Midlands Passenger Transport Executive, WMT's pre-deregulation predecessor, during early 1986.

The Leyland Lynx also proved highly popular with some of the major UK bus operating groups at the time of production: Caldaire Group companies West Riding and Yorkshire Woollen purchased 129 Lynxes and Lynx IIs new or second-hand until late 1991 to replace former National Bus Company vehicles as part of a yearly fleet replacement programme. Other Caldaire Group operators who purchased Leyland Lynxes included Tees & District and United Automobile Services. The Badgerline Group, meanwhile, purchased a total of 130 Leyland Lynxes for its operations across the United Kingdom, with 62 delivered to Bristol City Line between 1989 and 1990, 50 delivered to Midland Red West, eleven delivered to PMT, and seven delivered to the main Badgerline operation in 1990, with a further 30 acquired secondhand with the purchase of Eastern National in 1990. The AJS Group also purchased Lynxes for its Harrogate & District and Keighley & District operations.

Other operators of Leyland Lynxes included municipally owned and ex-PTE operators such as London Regional Transport, who took delivery of six for its London United subsidiary for use on route 283 in 1989, Lothian Regional Transport, who took delivery of the only Lynxes built to dual-door specification, Busways Travel Services, Cardiff Bus, Cleveland Transit, Colchester Borough Transport, Isle of Man Transport, Merthyr Tydfil Transport, Nottingham City Transport, and Preston Bus.

Lynxes were also ordered by former National Bus Company subsidiaries such as Brighton Transport, Boro'line Maidstone and Go-Ahead Northern. Four were delivered to former United Counties operation Luton & District in 1990 for use on the 'Luton Flyer' service between Luton Airport and Luton railway station, uniquely equipped with large luggage bays, a passenger audio system, increased standing capacity and high-backed seating. Independent purchasers of the Lynx included Metrobus, John Fishwick & Sons of neighbouring Leyland, Lancashire, Stevensons of Uttoxeter and Whitelaw's of Stonehouse.

The last two Lynxes entered service with municipal operator Halton Transport in August 1992, with the Lynx having been the core of Halton Transport's fleet for over 10 years; the company was the first municipal operator to order Lynxes and took delivery of the first MkII Lynx in 1990, with the operator owning a total of 36 Lynxes at the end of production.

=== Exports ===
A small number of Lynxes were exported as demonstrators, but no sales ever resulted.

In 1984, following a failed bid to market the chassis to Belgian operators, a framed Lynx chassis was sent to Australia. After being completed by JW Bolton in Perth, it operated for Transperth, ACTION and Hornibrook Bus Lines before being sold to Lever Coachlines in 1987. In 1989, two were bodied by Pressed Metal Corporation as demonstrators for the State Transit Authority, but the trial never occurred and they were sold to John J Hill, Wollongong.

In 1988, Singapore Bus Service took delivery of an Walter Alexander bodied Lynx. Originally serving feeder bus routes in Ang Mo Kio, it eventually ended up on employee bus services between Ang Mo Kio Bus Depot and Yishun. It was involved in an accident in August 2001 and had its original Lynx-style front fascia replaced with an Alexander PS type fascia. It was eventually withdrawn and scrapped in 2005. Conversely one Leyland Tiger received a Lynx-style Leyland body for export to New Zealand, initially being operated by Newmans Coach Lines and later Go Bus Transport.

In 1990, three of the order being built for West Midlands Travel were sent to Australia as demonstrators. Two operated with ACTION, while the third was demonstrated to the State Transport Authority and State Transit Authority, before all three were sold to Southtrans.
