= Cardiff Bus =

Municipal bus operator in Cardiff, Wales

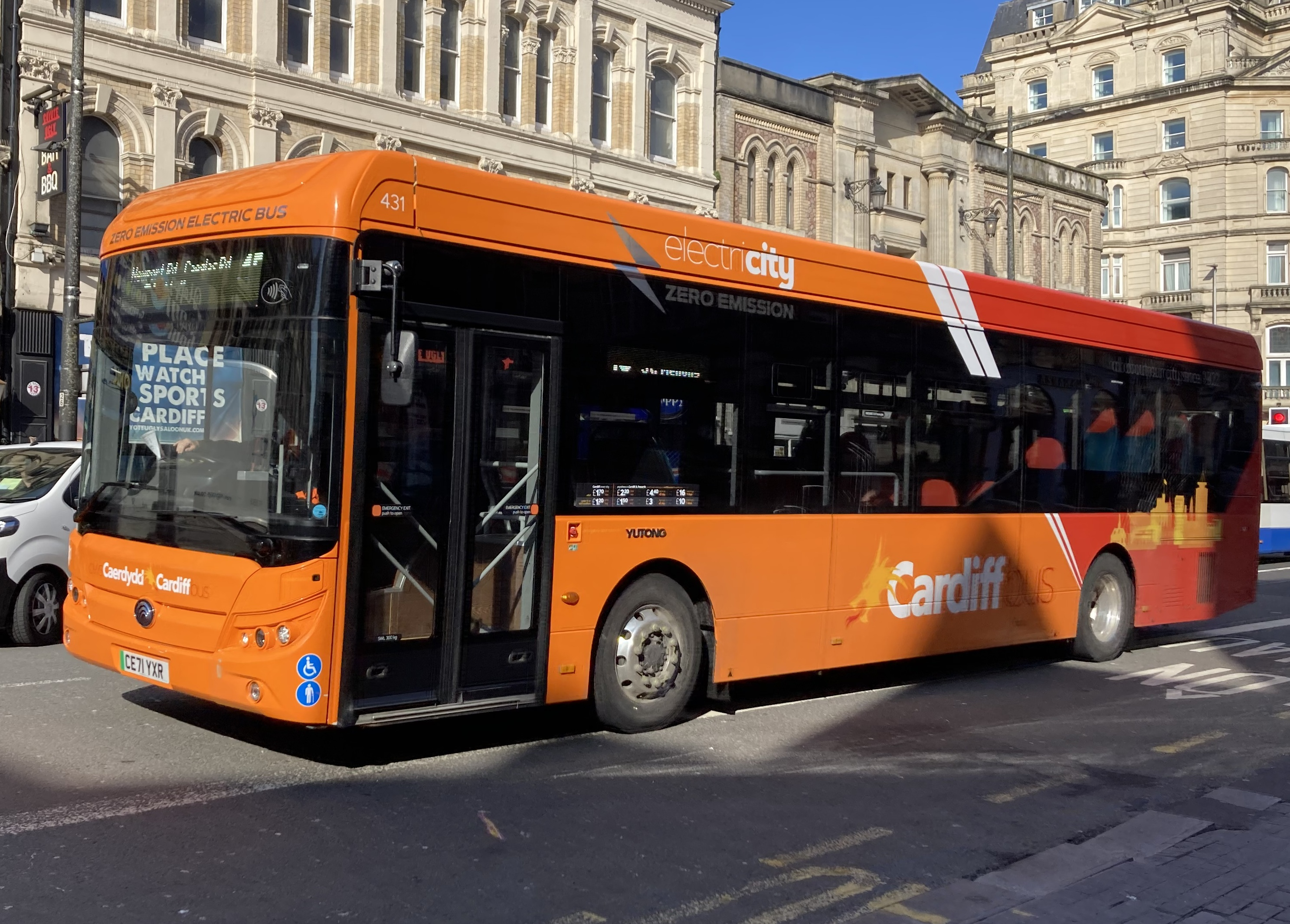
- Cardiff Bus Yutong E12 on St Mary Street, April 2023
- Parent: Cardiff Council
- Founded: May 1902
- Headquarters: Sloper Road; Leckwith; Cardiff; CF11 8TB
- Service area: Cardiff, Newport, Penarth, Barry
- Service type: Bus services
- Fleet: 171 (April 2025)
- Fuel type: Diesel and Electric
- Operator: Cardiff City Transport Services Limited
- Chairman Managing Director: Cllr Chris Lay; Craig Hampton-Stone
- Website: www.cardiffbus.com

Cardiff Bus (Welsh: Bws Caerdydd) is the main operator of bus services in Cardiff, Wales and the surrounding area, including Barry and Penarth. The company is wholly owned by Cardiff Council and is one of the few municipal bus companies to remain in council ownership; unlike most municipal bus companies elsewhere in Britain, which are run as an 'arm's length' organisation, Cardiff Bus is unique in that it is directly managed by Cardiff councillors who sit on the operator's board.

== History ==
While horse buses (and later horse trams) had run in the city since 1845, Cardiff Bus can trace its history back to May 1902, when Cardiff Council took over and electrified a tram line between Roath and the city centre. It had been previously run by the Cardiff Tramway Company. The resultant Cardiff Corporation Tramways spent the next three decades extending its electric tram network, and at its peak in 1927 ran 141 electric trams over 18 miles of line. On Christmas Eve 1920, the corporation introduced its first bus, although the first motor bus route was operated by the Tramway Company from 1907.

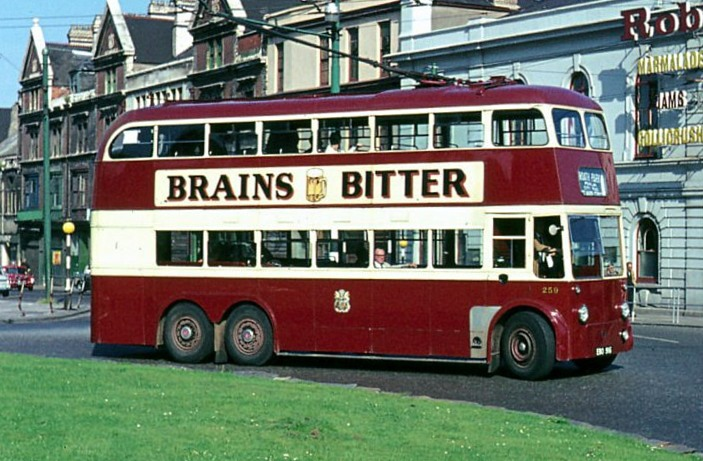
Cardiff Trolleybus 259 rounding the Bute Monument roundabout, 1966

The first Cardiff trolleybuses were introduced in 1942, their introduction having been delayed by the outbreak of World War II. The intention was to convert the remaining tramway system to trolleybus operation, then to extend the network. While the first stage was completed in 1950, the only extension made to the system was to Ely which took place in 1955. Although powers had been obtained to considerably expand the network, a policy U-turn occurred in 1961 when the decision was made to replace all the trolleybuses with motor buses. This task was completed in 1970, bringing to an end 68 years of electric traction on the streets of Cardiff.

=== Deregulation ===
The Transport Act of 1985 deregulated bus services outside London and required all Local Authorities to establish private "arm's length" bus companies. In October 1986 the council established a subsidiary company. In 1992, the closure of the National Welsh bus company led Cardiff Bus to extend and intensify its network in the areas and towns surrounding Cardiff, including Barry, the Vale of Glamorgan and Caerphilly. The Caerphilly local network of services including links between Cardiff, Caerphilly, Blackwood and Tredegar were discontinued in 2001 and are now provided by Stagecoach South Wales.

Cardiff Bus's dominant position following deregulation has sometimes come in for criticism and investigation. In 2004, 2Travel, a company operating significant numbers of school contract services in South Wales, launched low-cost services in Cardiff and Swansea to utilise its fleet between the school runs. Low fares were achieved by omitting major bus stations avoiding hefty access fees. Cardiff Bus launched a basic service in competition with 2Travel, using white buses bearing no livery also stopping short of the bus station. The Office of Fair Trading launched an investigation in 2007 into claims of predatory behaviour 18 months after 2Travel had ceased trading and gone into liquidation. The investigation found that Cardiff Bus had engaged in predatory behaviour.

From September 2016, four of Cardiff Bus' services (routes 51/53, 86 and X91) were transferred to its new Capital Links sister brand, with a further four services transferring over to Capital Links two months later. Vehicles used on these services are in either an orange or green base livery, and as of July 2017, Capital Links operate seven routes.

In the crossover of the years 2018 and 2019, Capital Links collapsed, and many of the routes were then dropped, with the exemption of route 51 and 53, which still run, as of Christmas 2020. Many of the capital links wrapped buses, are still wearing that vinyl, just not in service, and across the road from Cardiff Buses main depot on Sloper Road.

The company made a purchase of several battery-electric buses in April 2021 in their effort to modernise their fleet and transform how their network is delivered. The purchase comes with a successful bid from the Department of Transport to the city's ultra low emission zone scheme. These buses will have a range of 370 miles and were delivered at the end of 2021.

== Operations ==
Cardiff Bus has a turnover of £27million, employs around 705 people, on an average weekday carries around 100,000 passengers. In 2009 the company started to operate the park and ride service from Cardiff City Stadium to the city centre.

=== Fares ===
Cardiff Bus operates an exact fare policy and no change is given. The city used to be divided into four fare zones, but on 5 April 2009, Cardiff Bus introduced a flat fare of £1.60 for a one-way journey or £3.20 for all-day travel in Cardiff and Penarth, or £1.40/£2.80 for travel within Barry. These fares have since been increased several times, most recently to £2.60 for a one-way journey or £5.20 for all-day travel in Cardiff, Penarth and Llandough. Cardiff Bus offer separate tickets for their services outside of the Cardiff fare zone (£2.90 for a one-way journey and £5.00 for a day ticket in Barry, Dinas Powys or Sully only, £3.20 for a one way journey and £5.00 for a day ticket within Barry, Dinas Powys and Sully and a Full Network one-way journey ticket costing £3.70 and £6.70 for a day ticket). A weekly ticket can be purchased for travel within Cardiff for £19 on the mobile app (available for iOS and Android).

Cardiff bus is subscribed to the My Travel Pass scheme offered by the Welsh Government, meaning any passenger aged 5 - 21 can benefit from £1 one-way tickets and £3 day tickets that can be used on the majority of bus operators in Wales. Passengers aged 16 - 21 must have a My Travel Pass card present to benefit from the discounted fares.

==== Iff card ====
The Iff card was a contactless smart card introduced by Cardiff Bus in October 2010, allowing customers pay for their ticket without using cash, instead with a pre-paid ITSO smart card. The first 30,000 cards were issued free of charge and preloaded with £3 of credit, after which the cards will be charged at £5.

An amount of money would be electronically loaded onto the card, either upon boarding a bus or at the Cardiff Bus head office at Sloper Road. A passenger then chooses a ticket type. The card can also be used as a season ticket. Passengers were recommended to top-up when the balance was low, however, the card would still allow the customer to acquire a negative balance up to £3.

The card could be topped-up in units of £1, £2, £3, £4, £5, £10, £15 or £20, up to maximum amount of £50. The card was issued to persons aged between 6 and 60. The card was cancelled if not used for a continuous period of one year.

Iff cards were no longer accepted as a method of payment for passengers from 29th November 2025.

==== Contactless ====
In March 2018 the company introduced the Ticketer contactless card payment system on all its routes. As well as including an EFTPOS reader for Visa/Mastercard cards, fares can be bought and scanned using the Cardiff Bus app (which on most tickets including day to go and week to go tickets is cheaper than using cash). The reader can also scan QR codes from paper multi-journey tickets.

=== Fleet ===
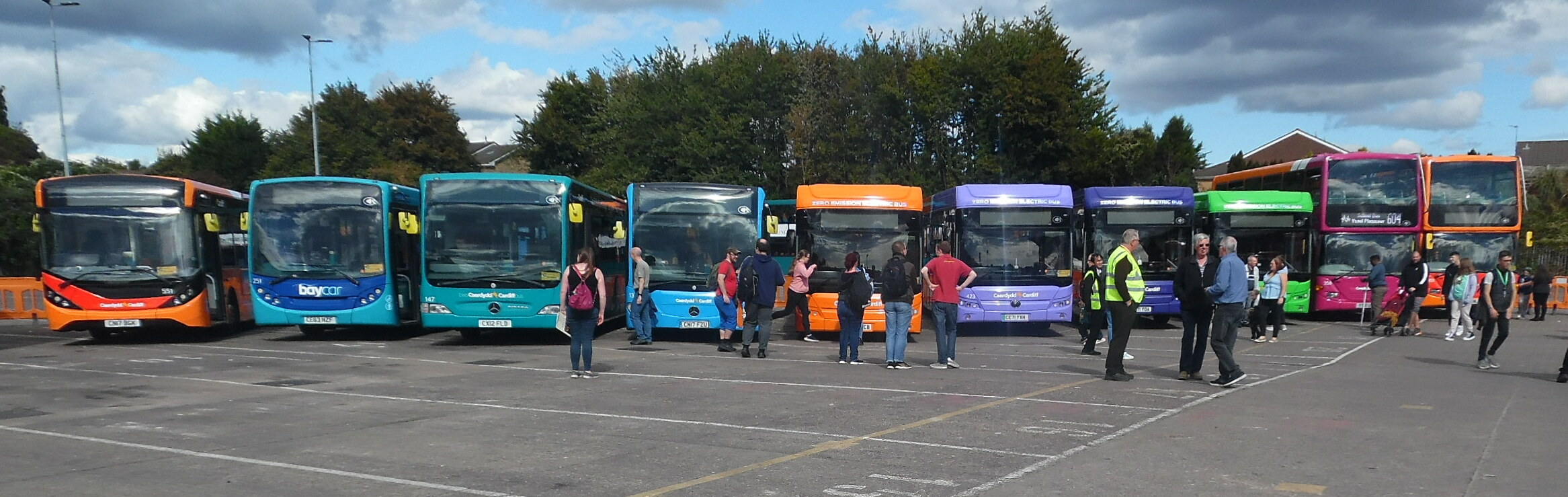
The modern day fleet at Cardiff Bus' Depot Open Day on 24 September 2022 to celebrate 120 years of service

As of April 2025, the fleet consists of 171 vehicles, all of which are low floor. Single deck vehicles dominate the fleet, accounting for 90.7% of the overall fleet. Since 2013, 90 brand new vehicles have been purchased, with the most recent being delivered in November and December 2021.

On the double deck side of the fleet, of which there are 20 vehicles, ten high capacity Alexander Dennis Enviro400s joined the fleet in 2015, a further 10 have arrived on loan between August 2022 and January 2023 but have now left the fleet. Prior to the delivery of the former, thirteen East Lancs Olympus bodied Scania N230UDs entered service in 2007 but have now all been withdrawn. In 2022, 8 second-hand N230UD Scania Omnidekka buses were purchased from Nottingham City Transport.

The most common single deck type was the Pointer-bodied Alexander Dennis/Dennis/TransBus Dart SLF, with 72 vehicles of three different lengths in the fleet, although these have now all been sold or withdrawn. The second most common type is the Scania OmniCity, with 43 in total. Nineteen of the OmniCitys were of the articulated variant but these have now all been withdrawn.

The Alexander Dennis Enviro200 also dominates, with 40 examples in the fleet, including ten with the "MMC" body with 4 others arriving on long-term loan in 2021. The Mercedes-Benz Citaro has become the large number of single deck type in recent years, with 53 Citaros in service as of October 2022, with 12 second-hand examples arriving from Bus Vannin in 2021. Operated in smaller numbers are the 7 Wright Solar bodied Scania K230UBs, with a further 6 arriving second-hand arriving from Go South Coast in 2021, however these have now all been withdrawn.

In May 2021, it was announced that the company has ordered 36 battery-electric Yutong E12 single decker buses. These started arriving in November 2021 and have been introduced mainly on routes 27, 44, 45, 49 and 50. 19 more arrived in early 2024 to bring the type to a total of 55 in all, 8 of these are branded for routes 17 & 18.

In April 2026, the company started introducing the first of a batch of 20 Volvo B8RLE MCV Evora 10.8 metre vehicles, Mainly for the Penarth and Barry routes 92, 92B, 93, 94, 95 and 96.

==== Branding ====
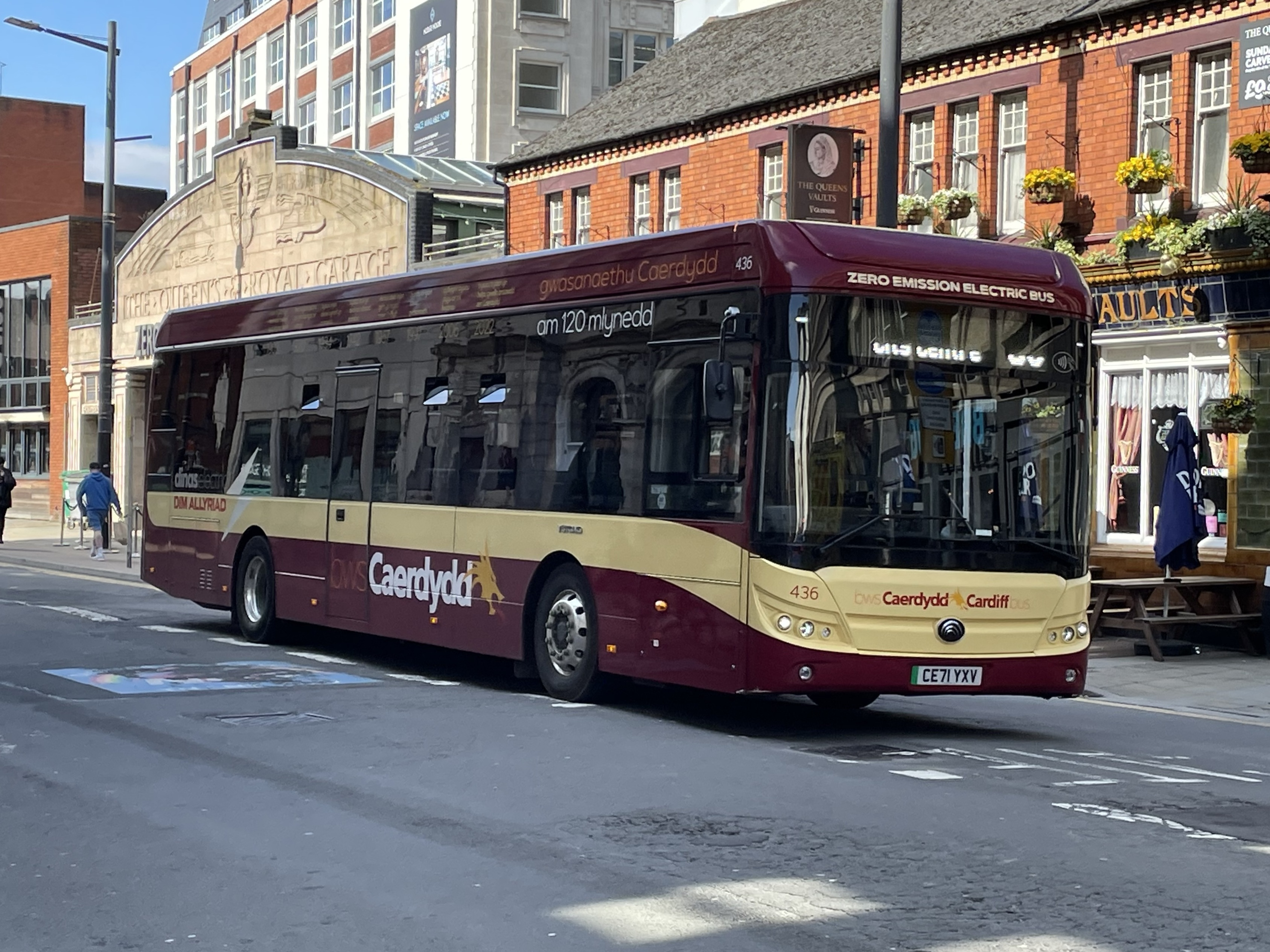
Yutong E12 in a heritage livery celebrating the 120th anniversary of Cardiff Bus

The original branding in both the entire tram, trolley bus and early bus operations until the 1970s was crimson lake and cream livery. This then changed to orange with white lining, from August 1972 with "City of Cardiff" on the left hand side and "Dinas Caerdydd" on the right hand side. This changed in 1986 when the business became Cardiff Bus. However, since the 1990s the dominant colouring has been green, first with cream lining and since the introduction of modern wrapping, a return for orange in the adjustments/outline.

Just before the introduction of the Iff Card, the company started a "your bus service" campaign, fronted by a series of local people's faces being applied in large scale on the sides and rears of selected buses.

Bus 472 (CN57 FGD) a Scania N270UD Optare Olympus, had a grey vinyl wrapped livery advertising the IFF card following its launch in 2008. It was then repainted into a heritage orange and white livery to celebrate 30 years since the formation of Cardiff Bus (after the 1986 deregulation of buses) and it currently sports a vinyl wrap celebrating Cardiff's sporting success with Cardiff City F.C., Cardiff Blues, Cardiff Devils ice hockey team and Geraint Thomas winning the 2018 Tour de France. It is no longer in service.

Bus 436 (CE71 YXV) a Yutong E12 has a livery in crimson lake and cream to celebrate the 120th anniversary of Cardiff Bus in 2022.

== See also ==
- Bus transport in Cardiff
- List of bus operators of the United Kingdom
- Municipal bus companies
- Transport in Wales
- Transport in Cardiff
