= Politics in Cardiff =

Overview of governance in Cardiff, Wales

Politics of Cardiff refers to the political representation of the city of Cardiff, capital of Wales. Cardiff is represented politically at a local, Wales and United Kingdom level and previously at the European level.

== Political representation ==
Cardiff is covered by four parliamentary constituencies which form the electoral basis for elections to the Parliament of the United Kingdom and the Senedd (Welsh Parliament).

The constituencies and their current representatives in the House of Commons are:

- Cardiff Central: Jo Stevens (Labour Party)
- Cardiff North: Anna McMorrin (Labour Party)
- Cardiff South and Penarth: Stephen Doughty (Labour Party)
- Cardiff West: Alex Barros-Curtis (Labour Party)

Famous politicians who have represented Cardiff constituencies include James Callaghan, a former Prime Minister who held his constituency seat for over forty years. Rhodri Morgan a former First Minister, was previously MP for Cardiff West, as had George Thomas, 1st Viscount Tonypandy, who served as Speaker of the House of Commons between 1976 and 1983.

== Senedd ==
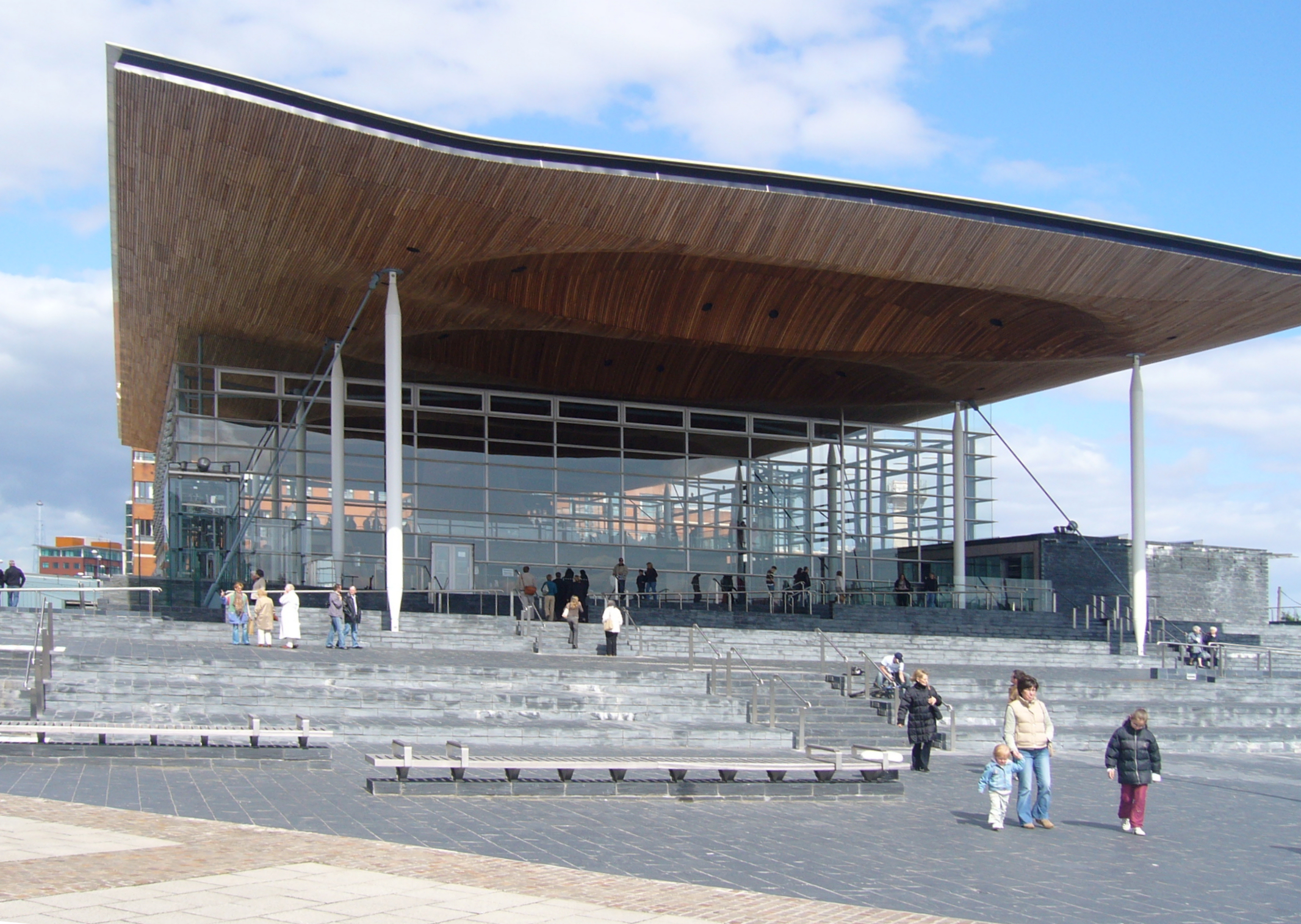
The Senedd building.

The Senedd (Welsh Parliament; Welsh: Senedd Cymru; formerly known as the National Assembly for Wales) has been based in Cardiff Bay since its formation in 1999. The building which is now known as the Senedd building was opened on 1 March 2006, by the Queen. The executive and civil servants of the Welsh Government are based in Cardiff's Cathays Park while the Members of the Senedd, the Senedd Parliamentary Service and Ministerial support staff are based in Cardiff Bay.

Between 1999 and 2026 Cardiff elected four constituency Assembly Members(AMs)/Members of the Senedd (MSs) to the Welsh Parliament, with the individual constituencies for the Welsh Parliament being the same as for the UK Parliament, namely Cardiff Central, Cardiff North, Cardiff South and Penarth and Cardiff West. All of the city's residents have an extra vote for the South Wales Central region which increased proportionality to the Senedd.

Since the 2026 Senedd election Cardiff has elected 12 Member of the Senedd from two constituencies, Caerdydd Penarth and Caerdydd Ffynnon Taf, each with six MSs elected via the D’Hondt method.

== Local government ==
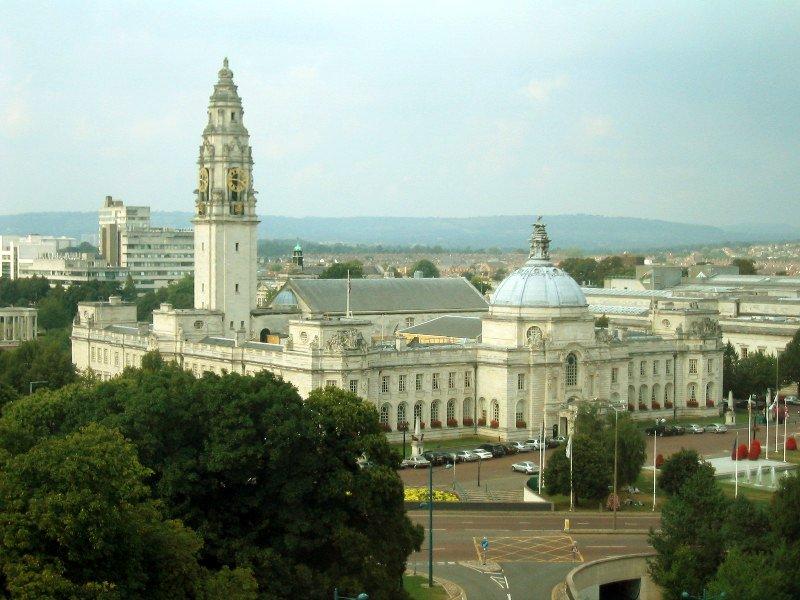
Cardiff's City Hall

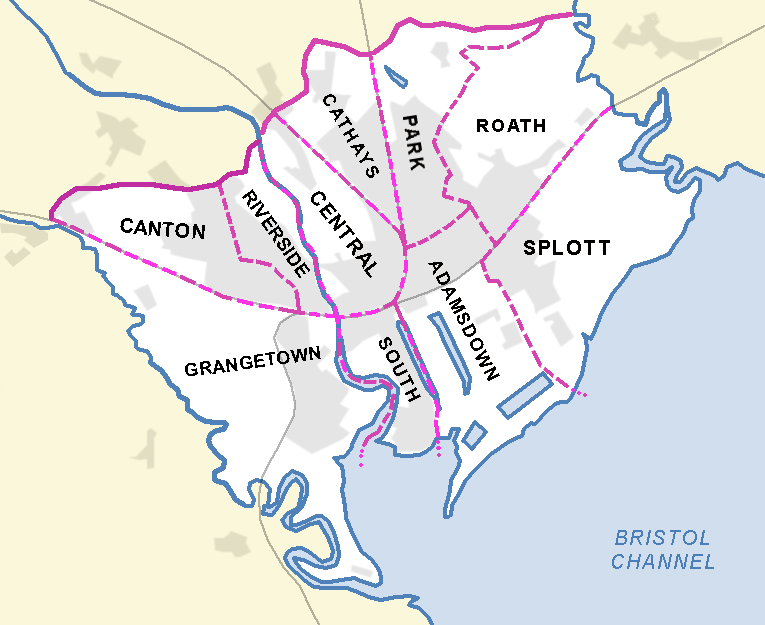
Cardiff electoral wards in 1890

Cardiff had an elected town council from 1836. In 1889 Cardiff became a county borough, represented by 40 elected councillors and aldermen on Cardiff County Borough Council (commonly referred to as Cardiff City Council after the town gained city status in 1905). Representation increased to 52 after 1922.

Between 1974 and 1996 the council became a second tier district council of South Glamorgan. Cardiff voters also elected councillors to South Glamorgan County Council.

Since local government reorganisation in 1996, Cardiff has been governed by the City and County Council of Cardiff, which is based at County Hall in Atlantic Wharf, Cardiff Bay. Voters elect 75 councillors every four years, with the next elections due to be held in 2016.

The council was run by a Labour majority administration between 1995 and 2004. The Liberal Democrats ran a minority administration from 2004 to 2008. In 2012 Labour regained control of the council.

=== Community Councils ===
There are currently six community Councils in Cardiff:

- Lisvane (10 seats)
- Old St. Mellons (9 seats)
- Pentyrch (13 seats)
- Radyr & Morganstown (13 seats)
- Tongwynlais (9 seats)
- St. Fagans (9 seats)

Communities of Cardiff that have their own community council

Elections are held every five years. The last contested elections would have been held in May 2017, had there been more candidates than available seats. For example, only six candidates stood in St Fagans for nine seats, whilst in Radyr & Morganstown eight candidates stood for thirteen seats. In Pentyrch, ten candidates (6 Ind, 3 Lab, 1 Plaid Cymru) put themselves forward for thirteen seats, so all were elected unopposed.

Community Councils have the ability to co-opt new Councillors between elections to fill vacancies if not enough candidates stand for election. Alternatively, a By-election will be called if ten or more registered electors within the relevant ward call for one after a Notice of Casual Vacancy is published.

In March 2020, there were twelve Co-opted Community Councillors in Cardiff (3 on Lisvane, 4 on Pentyrch, 3 on St Fagans, 1 on Tongwynlais and 1 on Radyr & Morganstown) as well as three vacant seats (2 on Old St Mellons and 1 on Pentyrch) on the six Council websites.

== See also ==
- List of mayors of Cardiff
