= Halton Transport =

Former municipal bus operator in North West England

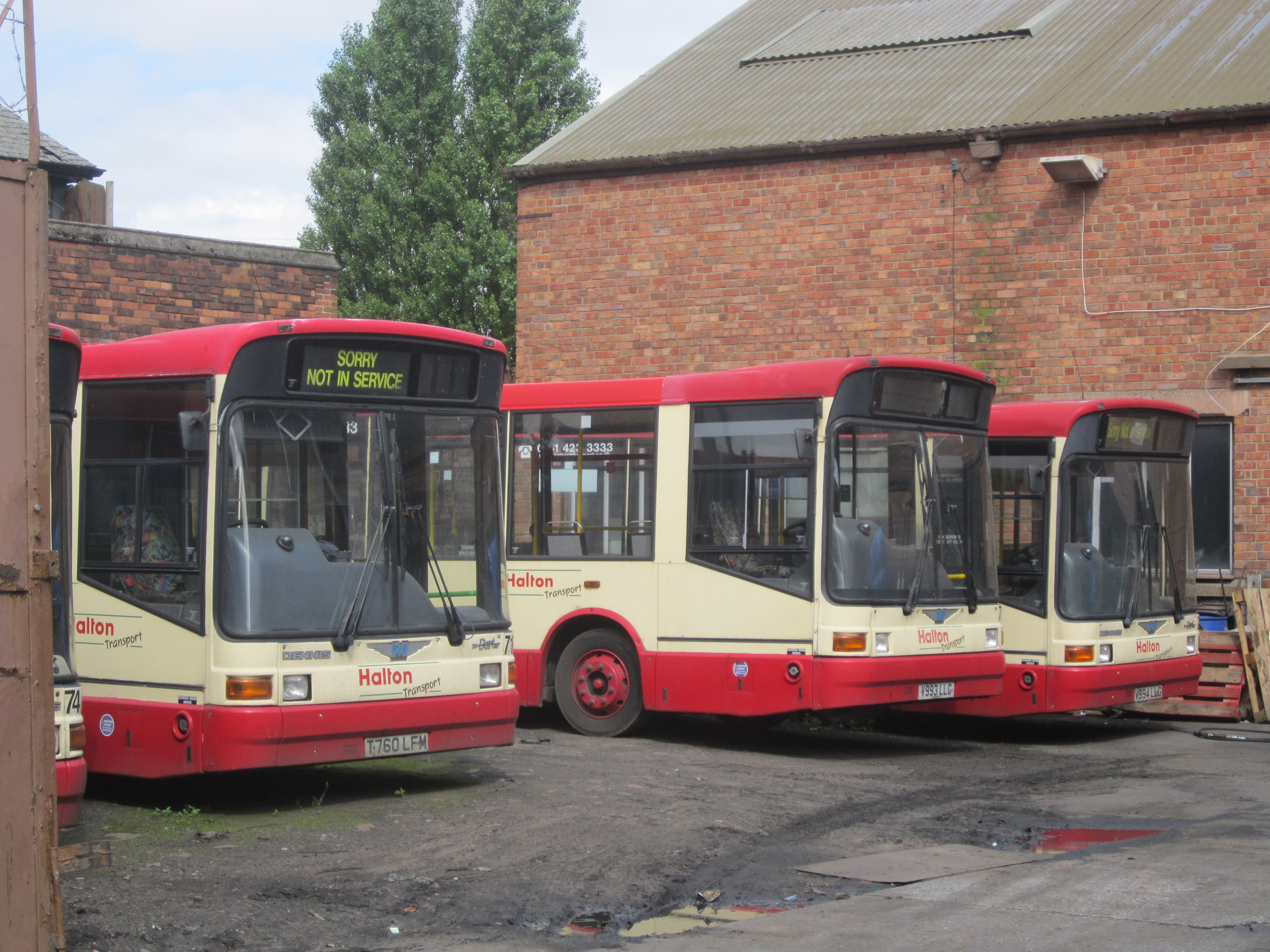
- Marshall Capital bodied Dennis Darts in August 2012
- Parent: Halton Borough Council
- Founded: Widnes Corporation Motor Omnibus Department in 1909; Halton Borough Council Passenger Transport Department in 1974; Halton Borough Transport in 1986
- Defunct: January 2020
- Headquarters: Widnes
- Service area: Cheshire; Merseyside
- Service type: Bus services
- Destinations: Liverpool; Runcorn; St Helens; Warrington; Widnes
- Fleet: 73 (March 2016)
- Chief executive: Colin Stafford
- Website: www.haltontransport.co.uk

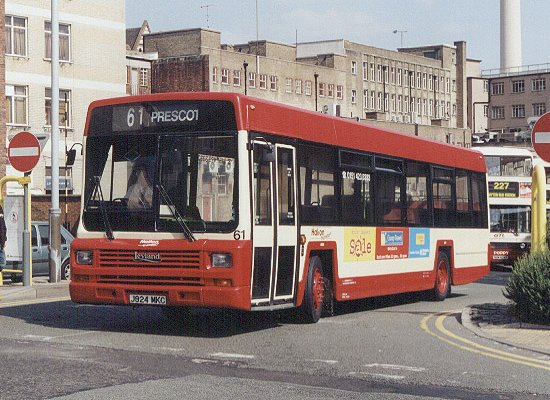
Leyland Lynx in Liverpool

Halton Transport was a bus operator running within the Borough of Halton (including the towns of Widnes and Runcorn) and into the surrounding area, including Warrington, St Helens, Prescot, Whiston, Huyton, and Liverpool. It ceased trading in January 2020.

== History ==
Halton Transport's origins can be traced back to April 1909 when Widnes Corporation Motor Omnibus Department commenced operating a bus service. Over the next few decades the network expanded to most parts of Widnes and in 1961 following the opening of the Runcorn Bridge extended to Runcorn. As part of local government organisation in 1974 control passed to the Halton Council.

To comply with the Transport Act 1985, the operation was transferred into a separate legal entity. Unlike many other municipal operators it was not privatised and remained owned by Halton Borough Council. Bus deregulation saw Halton Transport expand its sphere of operation to other areas including Liverpool.

The company was placed in liquidation in January 2020, after accumulating losses for several years.

== Fleet ==
The fleet consisted of 64 buses in January 2014.

Halton Transport were a long-time Leyland National operator, purchasing 20 new vehicles between 1972 and 1985, including the last one built. A further 27 were purchased second hand between 1986 and 1989. It then purchased 36 Leyland Lynxes between 1986 and 1992 including the last one built.

Between 1994 and 2005, Halton standardised on the Dennis Dart, purchasing a total of 80 new and three secondhand. Bodywork for the majority was supplied by Marshall Bus, but the final 21, delivered between late 2002 and spring 2005, received East Lancs Myllennium bodywork.

From 2007 to 2010 sixteen examples of the Dart's successor, the Alexander Dennis Enviro200, were purchased, the first twelve having MCV Evolution bodywork.

Between 2013 and 2015 Halton purchased a number of secondhand vehicles from various operators. These included six Optare Solo minibuses in 2013 and then 14 Scania Omnicities in 2014 from Metrobus, followed by three Plaxton Pointer Dennis Dart SLFs in 2015 from Abellio Surrey.
