= Llanrumney High School =

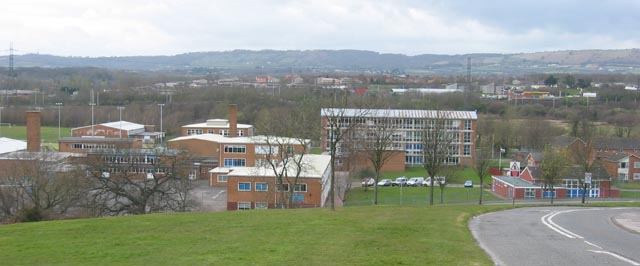

Location
- Ball Road; Llanrumney; Cardiff, CF3 4YW; Wales; 51.518°N 3.135°W

Information
- Type: Community
- Motto: "Educating for life"
- Established: 1957
- Closed: 2013
- Gender: Co-educational
- Age: 11 to 16
- Enrollment: 647 (2006)
- Language: English
- Website: www.llanrumney.cardiff.sch.uk

Llanrumney High School (Welsh: Ysgol Uwchradd Llanrhymni) was an English medium co-educational, community secondary school located in the Llanrumney area of Cardiff, Wales.

== History ==
The school served the communities of Llanrumney, Pentwyn and St Mellons on the eastern side of Cardiff when it closed. It was opened in 1957 as a segregated school. It later became a mixed-sex school with 647 children aged 11–16 attending during the Estyn school inspection in 2006, showing a reduction compared to 774 in 2000. 4% came from ethnic minority backgrounds.

== Closure proposals ==
=== Facilities reorganisation ===
On 20 March 2009 Cardiff Council published a legal statutory notice announcing their intention to close Llanrumney High School by 2012 as part of Cardiff County Council's plans to reduce surplus places in schools across the city. Pupils were to be merged with those from Rumney High School (which was also to close) and would be housed at a new English medium secondary school built on the Rumney Recreation Ground. The Eastern Leisure Centre sat in the middle of parkland at the Rumney Recreation Ground. Opened in 1982 by the former Labour Prime Minister and constituency MP James Callaghan, the leisure centre formed part of Cardiff Council's plans. The centre was set to be refurbished and form part of a joint educational and leisure complex on the Rumney Recreation Ground.

Reasons cited included that both of the schools were old and were falling into a state of disrepair. The intention was to build a new high school on the Rumney Recreation Ground with some of the playing fields at the existing Llanrumney High School site being retained whilst the rest of the site along with Rumney High School would be sold off. The proposed new school would form a partnership with Cardiff High School and Willows High School, with pupils entering further education at Coleg Glan Hafren, or elsewhere in the city where appropriate.

=== Reception ===
The plans led to the formation by residents from the communities of Llanrumney, Rumney, St Mellons and Trowbridge, Cardiff of the Rumney Recreation and Eastern Leisure Centre Action Group (RREEL). The RREEL Action Group was a non-political organisation that sought to preserve the Rumney Recreation Ground from the proposed development. RREEL presented Cardiff Council with an 8,000 signed petition and 3,500 letters of objection. In February 2009 under provisions set out in the Local Government Act 1972 RREEL organised a local community poll for the residents of Llanrumney and Rumney.

During the run up to the community poll a public meeting was held at the Royal British Legion in Llanrumney on 3 February 2009. Cardiff Council Leader, Liberal Democrat Councillor, Rodney Berman attended along with the Deputy Council Leader, Plaid Cymru Councillor, Neil McEvoy. They were accompanied by the Chief School's Officer and other senior council figures. Council leaders sought to explain the rationale behind the plans.

In the week prior to the community poll the Cardiff Conference of Secondary Heads sent Council Leader Rodney Berman a letter, dated 10 February 2009, expressing their support for the council's plans. Whilst the three Llanrumney Labour Councillors Morgan, Parry and Joyce called on the people of Llanrumney to vote no.

=== Local community poll ===
Residents of Llanrumney and Rumney voted in a community poll held over five hours on 17 February 2009. The question they were asked to vote on at the ballot box was "Do you agree with Cardiff City and County Council that the new school should be built on the Rumney Recreation Ground/Eastern Leisure Centre Site?"

93% voted against the proposed development on a turnout of 27.6%. This was a comparable turnout to local council elections considering that there were only five polling hours, no postal votes and no postal cards were issued. In Llanrumney 2,082 people voted no, 170 people voted yes and there were 18 spoilt ballots. The turnout in Llanrumney was 28.7%.

Council Leader Rodney Berman announced in response that the council's development plans would proceed and that the community poll result was noted but would not be acted upon.

A total of 1257 objections were registered during the objection period to 20 May 2009.

=== Council report ===
Cardiff Council presented these objections and their proposals to the Welsh Assembly Government on 20 June 2009. Cardiff Council's report noted that 1,257 letters of objection to the proposal were received. Notables who objected included Rumney High School Governing Body, Fields in Trust, Alun Michael MP, David Melding AM, Lorraine Barrett AM, Andrew RT Davies AM, Cllrs Cook, Parry, Ireland, Hudson, Morgan, Joyce and RREEL. The Council's report written by the Chief School's Officer, Chris Jones, stated that the majority of responses received have expressed support for a new high school to serve the East of Cardiff with the main objections being to the location of the new school. The Council concluded their case by stressing that their plans involved far more than educational changes, and stating their plans would transform the communities of Llanrumney and Rumney.

=== Closure ===
The school remained open for a period, in part due to the cancellation of the "Rumney Rec" proposals.

The school eventually closed at the end of the 2013 summer term, with all students being transferred to Rumney High School, which was renamed Eastern High School in September 2013.
