= Ian Robinson (rugby union) =

Wales international rugby union player

- Full name: Ian Roger Robinson
- Born: 21 February 1944 Cardiff, Wales
- Died: 24 July 2014 (aged 70) Penarth, Wales
- Height: 6 ft 6 in (198 cm)

Rugby union career
- Position: Lock
Senior career
| Years | Team | Apps | (Points) |
| 1964–80 | Cardiff RFC | 384 | (?) |
International career
| Years | Team | Apps | (Points) |
| 1974 | Wales | 2 | (0) |

Ian Roger Robinson (21 February 1944 — 24 July 2014) was a Welsh rugby union international.

Robinson was raised in Rumney, Cardiff and educated at Cae'r Castell School.

Capped twice for Wales during the 1974 Five Nations Championship, Robinson was a 6 ft 6 in lock, renowned for his hardness. He spent his entire career with Cardiff RFC, playing 384 first-class games.

A salesman by profession, Robinson married his wife Jenny in 1993. He died of prostate cancer at the age of 70.

== See also ==
- List of Wales national rugby union players
