= Rumney High School =

Location
- Newport Road; Rumney; Cardiff, CF3 3XG; Wales
- Coordinates: 51°30′55″N 3°7′9″W

Information
- Type: Community
- Closed: August 2014
- Gender: Co-educational (male and female)
- Age: 11 to 16
- Language: English

Rumney High School was an English medium co-educational, community school in the Rumney area of Cardiff, Wales. The school served the communities of Rumney and Trowbridge on the eastern side of Cardiff and was opened in the 1950s alongside Llanrumney High School.

Rumney High School was opened in the 1950s as Cae'r Castell School. In 1958 the school was used as one of the venues for the Sixth Commonwealth Games, hosting all seven fencing competitions. The event saw Wales take two bronze medals, in the team sabre and foil events, and several of the competitions were attended by Prince Philip, Duke of Edinburgh and Charles the future Prince of Wales.

A proposal to close Rumney High School and Llanrumney High School was published by the Cardiff Council on 20 March 2009. A total of 1257 objections were registered during the objection period to 20 May 2009. The proposal was due to be implemented in 2012 but was overturned in mid-2011. Reasons cited include the fact that both of the schools were old and falling into a state of disrepair; the intention was to rebuild one new state of the art high school building on the existing Llanrumney site, with Rumney High School grounds being sold to fund the project. The proposed new school would form a partnership with Cardiff High School and Willows High School, with pupils entering further education at Coleg Glan Hafren, or elsewhere in the city where appropriate.

However, these plans were abandoned. Instead Llanrumney High School closed in August 2013, with all students being transferred to Rumney High School. Rumney High School itself was closed in August 2014. The new Eastern High School opened on the site in September 2014, before moving to its new home at the Eastern Community Campus on Trowbridge Road in January 2018.
