= Llanrumney =

Suburb and community in Cardiff, Wales

Coordinates: 51.52251°N 3.12564°W

Llanrumney: Welsh: Llanrhymni
- Location within Cardiff
- Population: 11,060 (2011)
- OS grid reference: ST220810
- Principal area: Cardiff
- Preserved county: South Glamorgan
- Country: Wales
- Sovereign state: United Kingdom
- Post town: CARDIFF
- Postcode district: CF3
- Dialling code: 029
- Police: South Wales
- Fire: South Wales
- Ambulance: Welsh
- UK Parliament: Cardiff East
- Senedd Cymru – Welsh Parliament: Cardiff South & Penarth
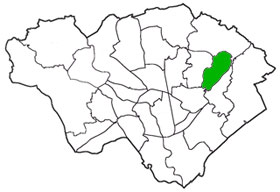
- List of places UK Wales Cardiff

Llanrumney (Welsh: Llanrhymni) is a suburb and community (and electoral ward of the same name) in east Cardiff, Wales.

== History ==
The land where modern Llanrumney stands was left to Keynsham Abbey by the Lord of Glamorgan after the Norman Conquest. According to legend, Llywelyn ap Gruffudd, the final prince of an independent Wales, was interred in a stone coffin by the monks in 1282, on land where Llanrumney Hall would be built centuries later.

After Henry VIII's dissolution of the monasteries in the sixteenth century, the land passed to the Kemeys family. It remained in their possession until 1951, when it and its grounds were compulsorily purchased by the local authority in order to build the large estates that can be seen there today.

The origins of the name Llanrumney are found in the Welsh word glan ('bank, shore') and the Anglicised version of Rhymni, the name of the local river. The substitution of glan for llan ('church') is explained by the fact that in Welsh, 'lan' is the lenited form of both glan and llan. Thus phrases such as 'i Lanrhymni' and 'o Lanrhymni' (that include the common prepositions i 'to' and o 'from') could be understood as referring to a place called either Glanrhymni or Llanrhymni.

The district is predominantly composed of large-scale council estates and is bounded by the wards of Pontprennau & Old St. Mellons to the north, Rumney to the south, Penylan to the southwest, and Pentwyn to the west. The electoral ward of Llanrumney falls within the parliamentary constituency of Cardiff South and Penarth.

The area has a number of shopping precincts, the largest of which is on Countisbury Avenue. Llanrumney Hall, a pub that is reputedly haunted, is one of several local places associated with the pirate Henry Morgan, and is claimed to have been his home from 1635.

Llanrumney Library opened in 2008, replacing an older building.

Cyncoed Ladies F.C. of the Welsh Premier Women's Football League have been based in the area since they were formed in 2005.

== Politics ==
Llanrumney is in the parliamentary constituency of Cardiff East and the Cardiff Central Senedd constituency.

=== Cardiff Council ===
Llanrumney is both an electoral ward and a community in Cardiff Council. The ward elects three councillors to Cardiff Council every five years. The community of Llanrumney does not have a community council.

== Transport ==
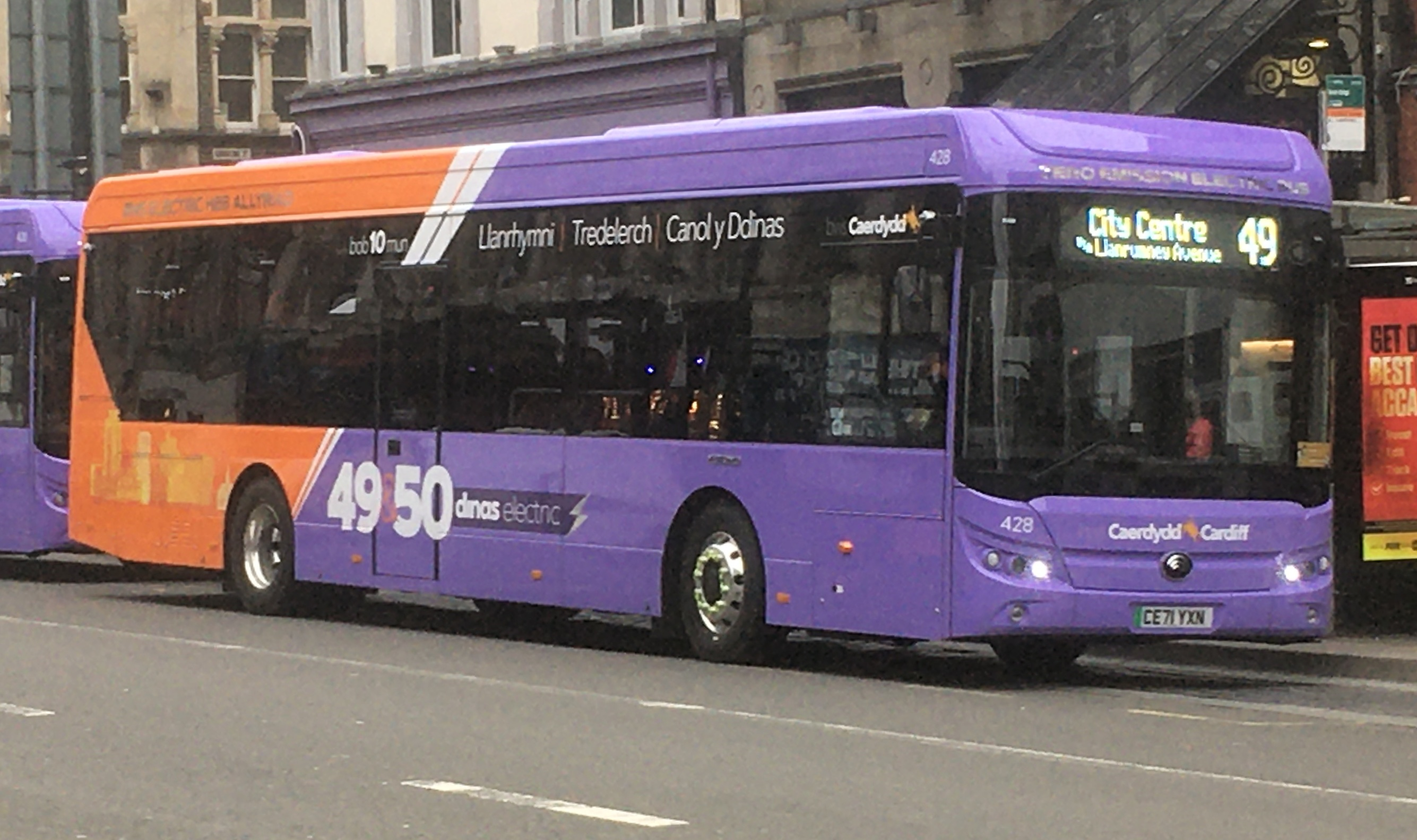
A Cardiff Bus zero-emission bus with 49/50 service livery, which serves Llanrumney

Cardiff Bus services 49/50 serve the area, with buses running frequently to and from the city centre. Routes 65 and 65A link Llanrumney, along with a number of other local suburbs, to the Heath Hospital. The area is currently accessible only via various junctions along Newport Road, which also connects the suburb to the city centre to the south west and St Mellons, the A48(M) and Newport to the north east.

In February 2008, Cardiff County Council approved plans for a new Park and Ride facility to be created on the Rhymney River flood plain adjacent to the nearby Pentwyn Interchange of the A48. In November the same year the site was cleared and access roads created from the nearby A48, signalling the beginning of the project.

In December 2019, as part of the council's East Cardiff Industrial Strategy, a plan was announced to ease congestion in east Cardiff by constructing a road and a bridge to link Llanrumney with the Pentwyn Park & Ride site.

== Education ==
Llanrumney has six primary schools: Bryn Hafod, Pen-y-Bryn, Glan-yr-Afon, St Cadoc's and Bro Eirwg, and one secondary school, St Illtyd's Catholic High School. Llanrumney High School closed in 2013 as part of the Council's plans to reorganise secondary education in the city.

=== High School closure ===
On 20 March 2009 Cardiff Council published a legal statutory notice announcing their intention to close Llanrumney High School by 2012 as part of Cardiff County Council's plans to reduce surplus places in schools across the city. Pupils will be merged with those from Rumney High School, which is also to close, and will be housed at a new English medium secondary school built on the Rumney Recreation Ground.

The plans led to the formation by residents from the communities of Llanrumney, Rumney, St Mellons and Trowbridge, Cardiff of the Rumney Recreation and Eastern Leisure Centre Action Group (RREEL), seeking to preserve the Rumney Recreation Ground from the proposed development.

A public meeting was held at the Royal British Legion in Llanrumney on 3 February 2009. Cardiff Council Leader Rodney Berman and Deputy Council Leader, Neil McEvoy, and other senior council figures sought to explain the rationale behind the plans.

Also in February the Cardiff Conference of Secondary Heads sent expressing their support for the council's plans. The three Llanrumney Labour Councillors Morgan, Parry and Joyce called on the people of Llanrumney to vote no.

Residents of Llanrumney and Rumney voted in a community poll held on 17 February 2009. The question they were asked to vote on at the ballot box was "Do you agree with Cardiff City and County Council that the new school should be built on the Rumney Recreation Ground/Eastern Leisure Centre Site?" - 93% voted against the proposed development on a turnout of 27.6%. In Llanrumney 2,082 people voted no, 170 people voted yes and there were 18 spoilt ballots. The turnout in Llanrumney was 28.7%.

Council Leader Rodney Berman announced in response that the council's development plans would proceed and that the community poll result was noted but would not be acted upon. Cardiff Council presented these objections and their proposals to the Welsh Assembly Government on 20 June 2009. Cardiff Council's report noted that 1,257 letters of objection to the proposal were received.

== Gallery ==
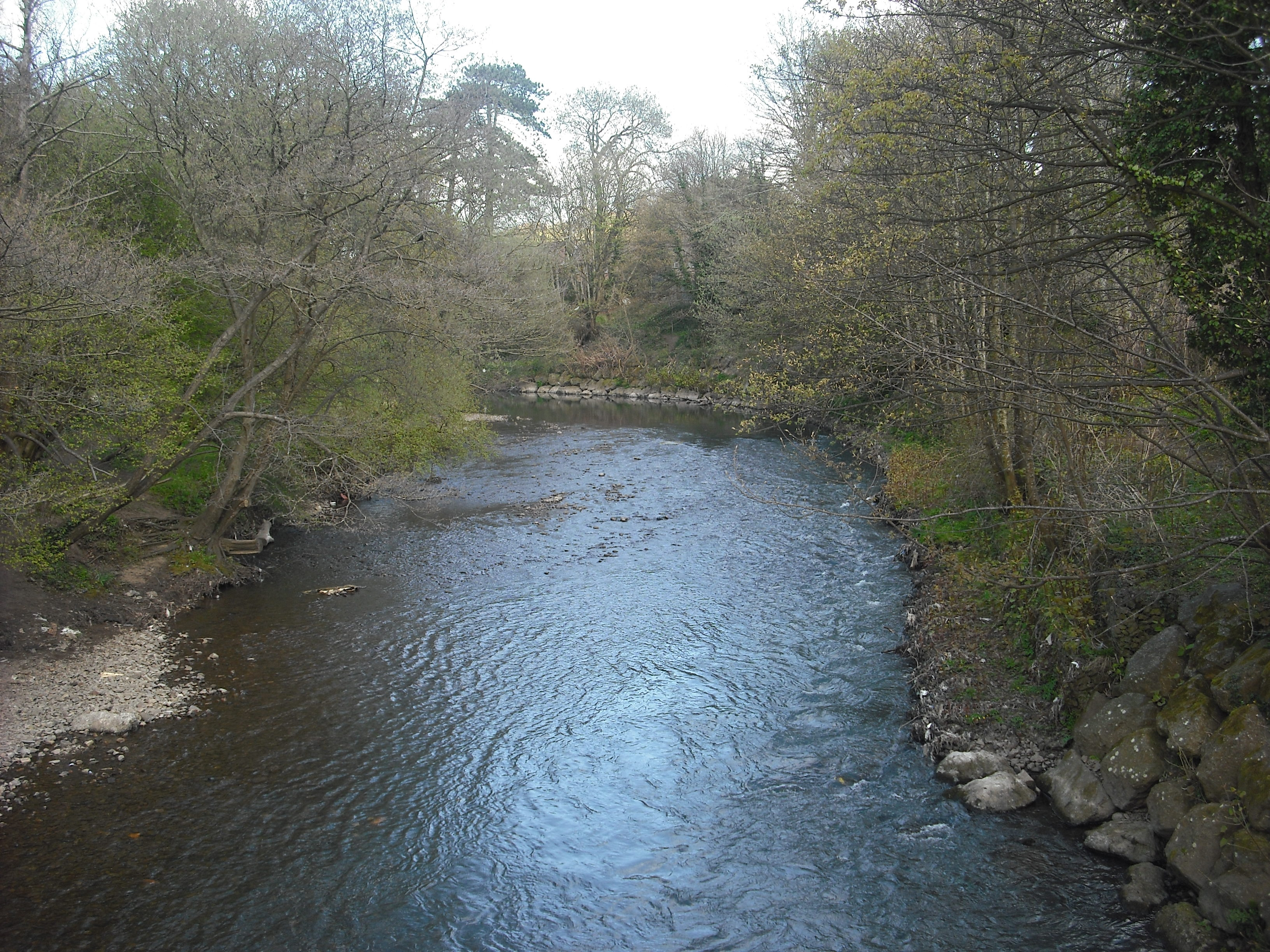
Rhymney River

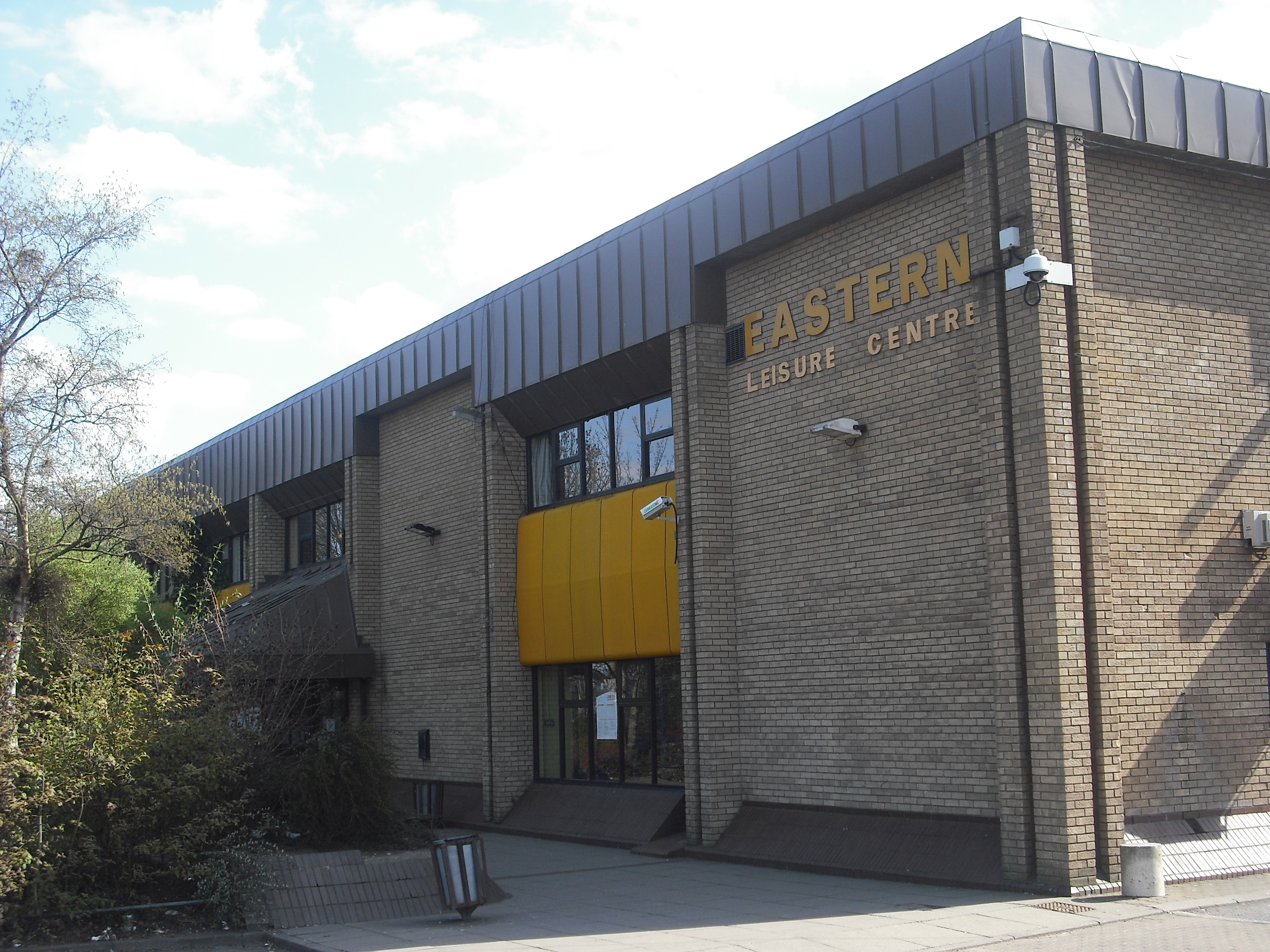
Eastern Leisure Centre

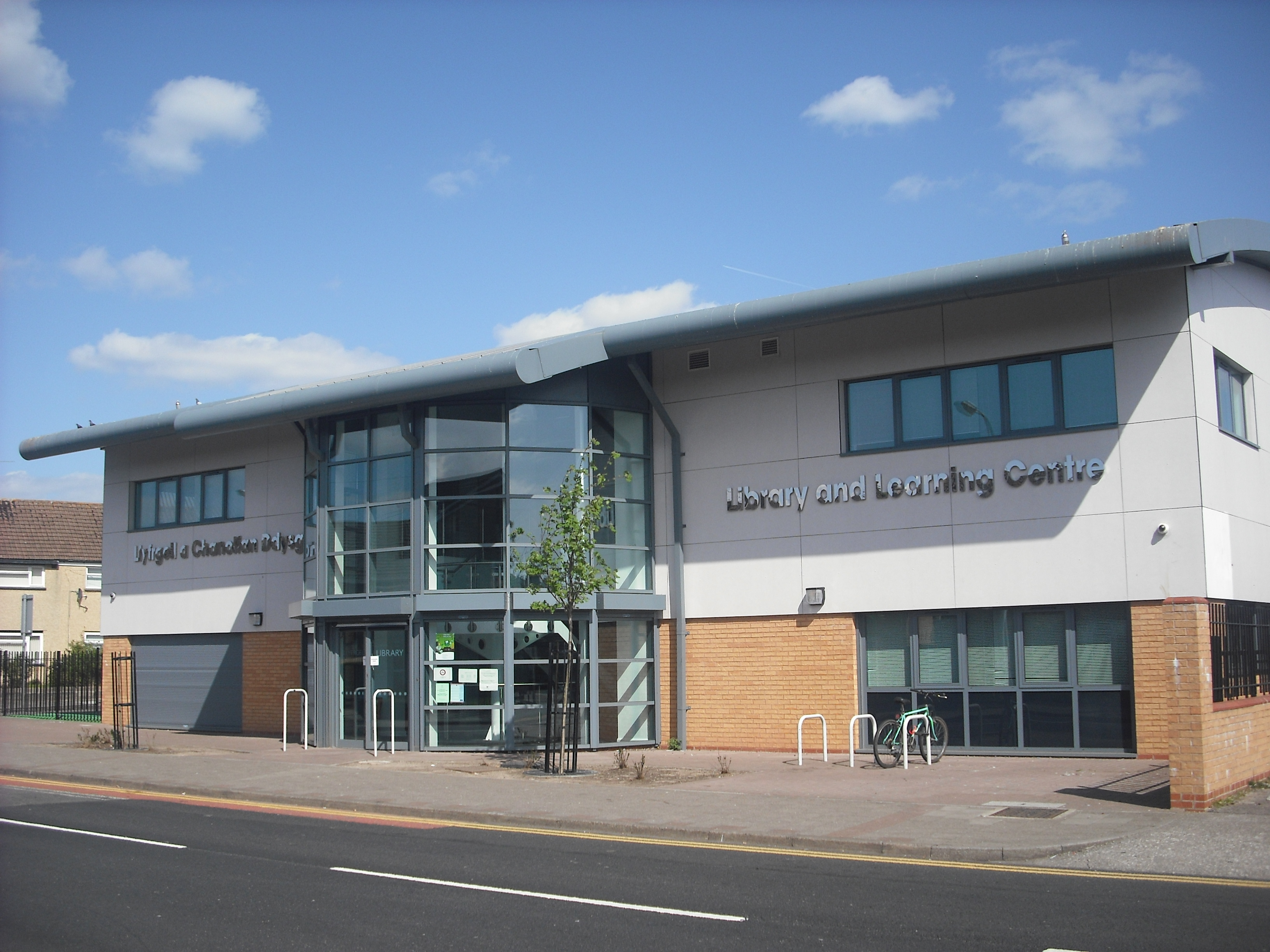
Llanrumney Library
