= 1958 British Empire and Commonwealth Games =

Multi-sport event in Cardiff, Wales

VI British Empire and Commonwealth Games
- Original poster for the Games
- Host city: Cardiff, Wales
- Nations: 35
- Athletes: 1122
- Events: 94
- Opening: 18 July 1958
- Closing: 26 July 1958
- Opened by: Prince Philip, Duke of Edinburgh
- Queen's Baton Final Runner: Ken Jones
- Main venue: Cardiff Arms Park

The 1958 British Empire and Commonwealth Games (Welsh: Gemau Ymerodraeth Prydain a'r Gymanwlad 1958) were held in Cardiff, Wales, from 18 to 26 July 1958. It was the sixth edition of what would come to be known as the Commonwealth Games, the second Games held in the United Kingdom, and the second held under the name British Empire and Commonwealth Games.

Thirty-five nations sent a total of 1,130 athletes and 228 officials to the Cardiff Games and 23 countries and dependencies won medals, including, for the first time, Singapore, Ghana, Kenya and the Isle of Man. 178,000 tickets were eventually sold during the Games.

The Cardiff Games introduced the Queen's Baton Relay, which has been conducted as a prelude to every Commonwealth Games ever since. England topped the medal table.

== Venues ==
The British Empire and Commonwealth Games, including the opening and closing ceremonies, were held at the Cardiff Arms Park.

The following venues were used during the Games.

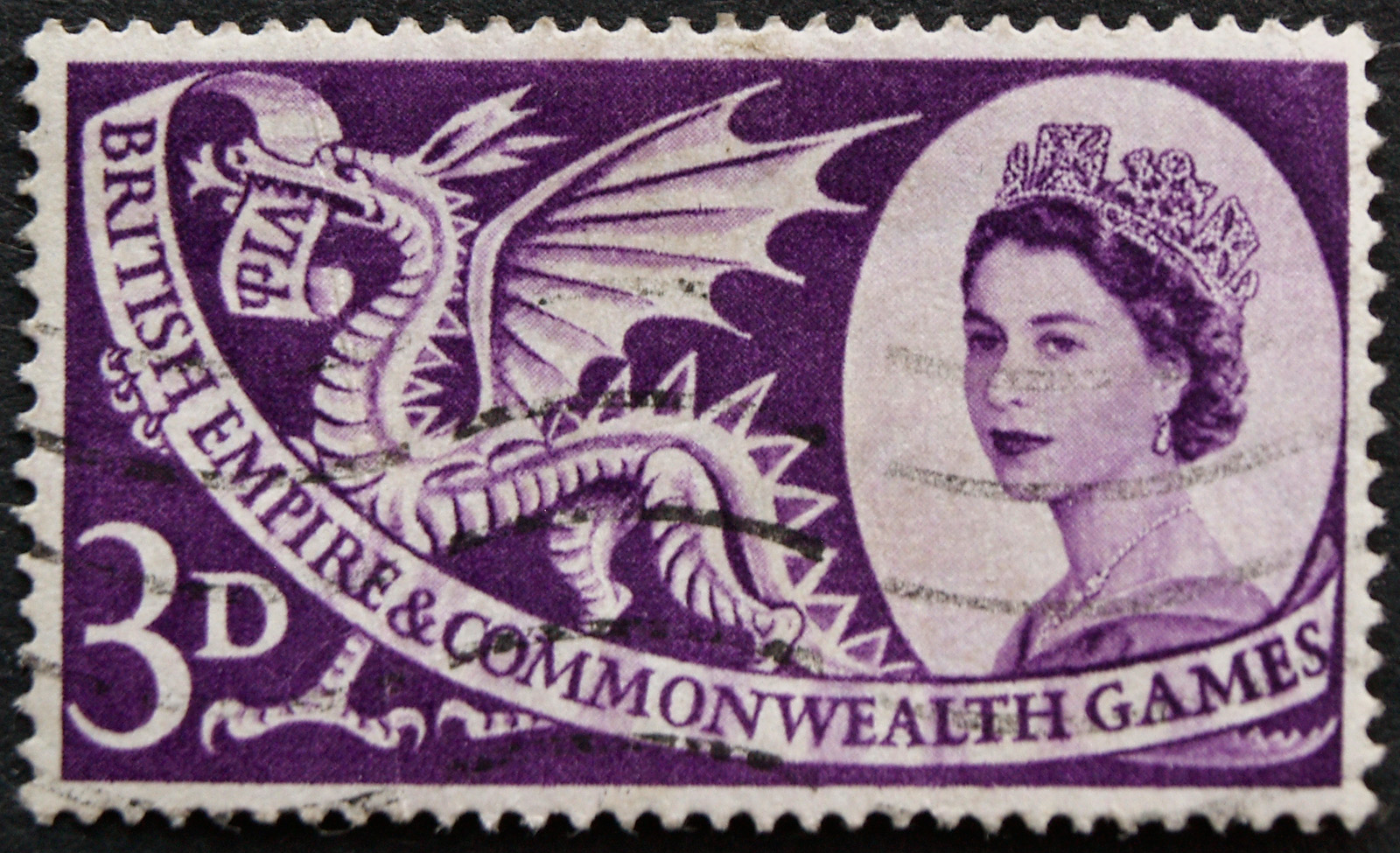
Postage stamp

- Village - Royal Air Force St Athan
- Aquatics - A new Wales Empire Pool was constructed for the event
- Athletics - Cardiff Arms Park
- Boxing - Sophia Gardens Pavilion
- Cycling (track) - Maindy Stadium
- Cycling (road) - Ogmore-by-Sea District Loop
- Fencing - Cae'r Castell School
- Lawn bowls - Sophia Gardens and Guest Keen Sports Club
- Polo (Demo Sport) - Llandaff Fields
- Rowing - Llyn Padarn in Llanberis
- Showjumping (Demo Sport) - Ninian Park
- Weightlifting - Memorial Hall in Barry
- Wrestling - Sophia Gardens Pavilion
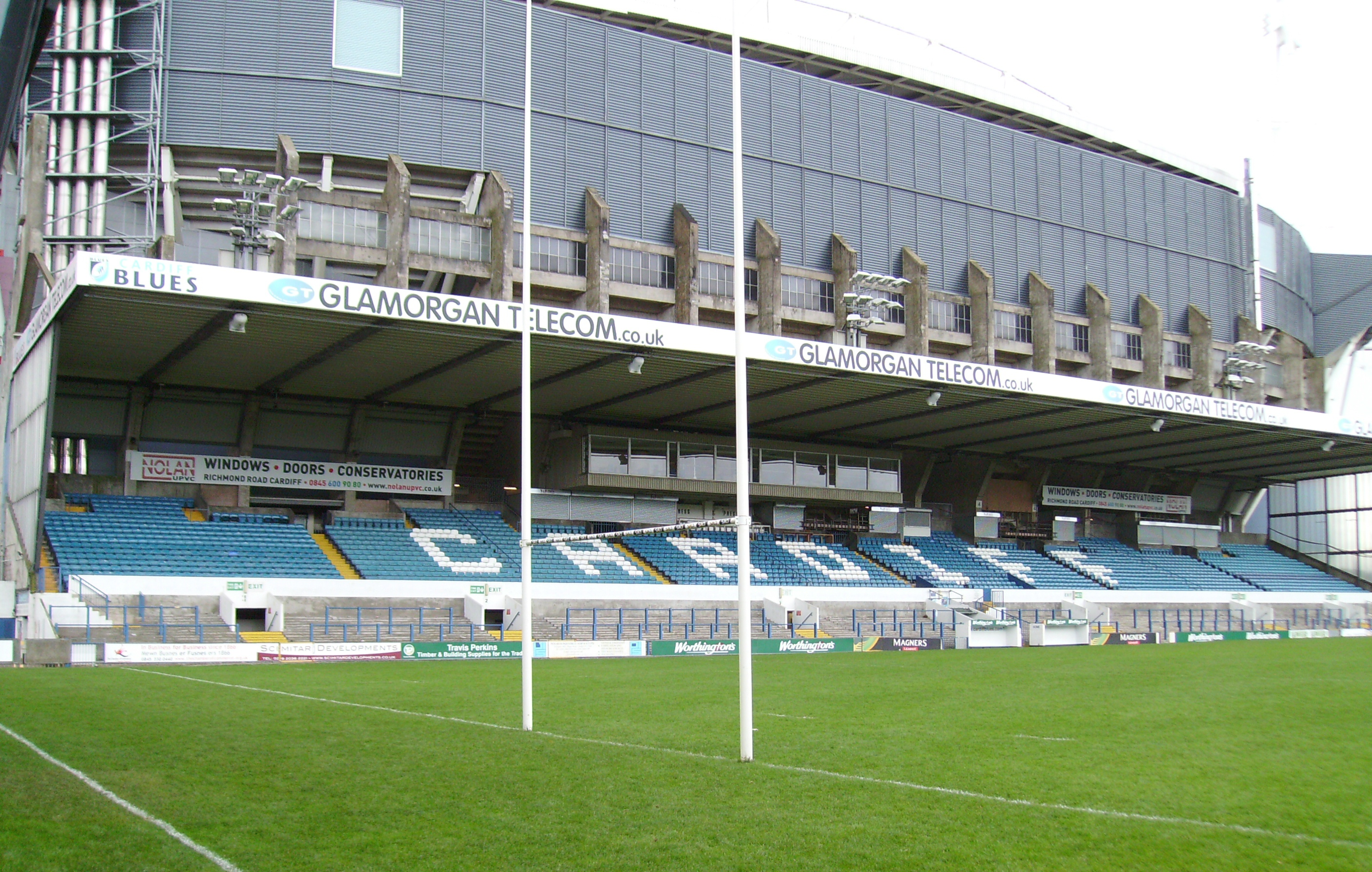
Cardiff Arms Park

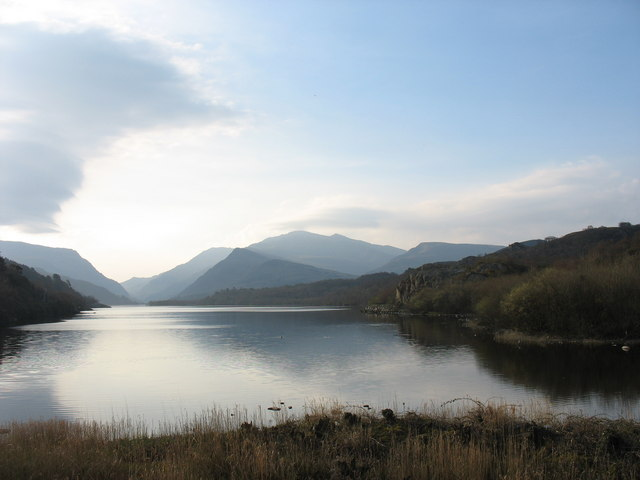
Llyn Padarn

== Participating teams ==
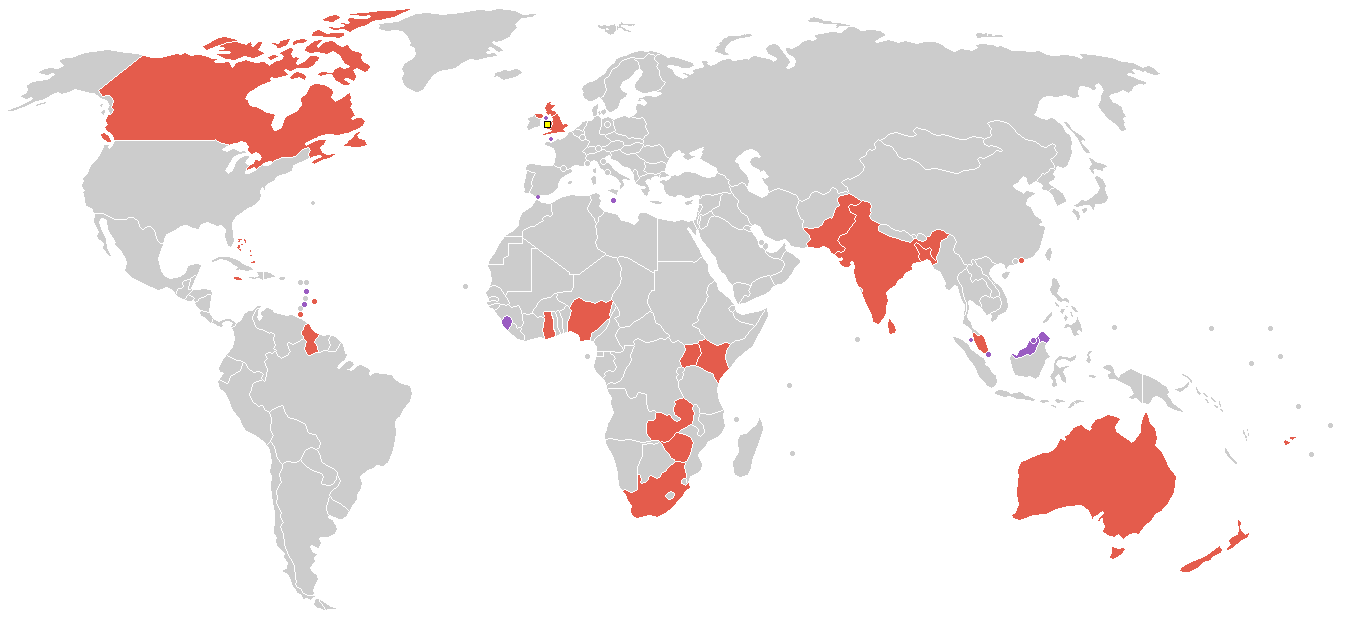
Countries that participated

36 countries and territories were represented (and 1,100 athletes), being the largest number to date, with a significant number of teams competing for the first time at the 1958 British Empire and Commonwealth Games.

At Cardiff Arms Park, an anti-apartheid crowd protested at the all-white South African team; games organisers responded that non-white South Africans were ineligible as their associations were not affiliated to the international federations. South Africa left the Commonwealth in 1961 and next appeared at the Games in 1994.

Participating Commonwealth countries and territories:

- Australia
- Bahama Islands
- Barbados
- British Guiana
- Canada
- Ceylon
- Dominica
- England
- Fiji
- Ghana
- Gibraltar: first appearance
- Hong Kong
- India
- Isle of Man: first appearance
- Jamaica
- Jersey: first appearance
- Kenya
- (Federation of Malaya) Malaya
- Malta: first appearance
- Mauritius: first appearance
- New Zealand
- Nigeria
- North Borneo: first appearance
- Northern Ireland
- Northern Rhodesia
- Pakistan
- Saint Vincent and the Grenadines: first appearance
- Sarawak: first appearance
- Scotland
- Singapore: first appearance
- Sierra Leone: first appearance
- South Africa
- Southern Rhodesia
- Trinidad and Tobago
- Uganda
- Wales (host)

== Medal table ==
* Host nation (Wales)

Medals won by nation, ranked by number of golds, with totals—sortable
Rank	Nation	Gold	Silver	Bronze	Total
1	England	29	22	29	80
2	Australia	27	22	17	66
3	South Africa	13	10	8	31
4	Scotland	5	5	3	13
5	New Zealand	4	6	9	19
6	Jamaica	4	2	1	7
7	Pakistan	3	5	2	10
8	India	2	1	0	3
9	Singapore	2	0	0	2
10	Canada	1	10	15	26
11	Wales*	1	3	7	11
12	Northern Ireland	1	1	3	5
13	Bahama Islands	1	1	0	2
13	Barbados	1	1	0	2
15	Malaya	0	2	0	2
16	Nigeria	0	1	1	2
17	British Guiana	0	1	0	1
17	Uganda	0	1	0	1
19	Kenya	0	0	2	2
19	Southern Rhodesia	0	0	2	2
19	Trinidad and Tobago	0	0	2	2
22	Ghana	0	0	1	1
22	Isle of Man	0	0	1	1
22	Northern Rhodesia	0	0	1	1
Totals (24 entries)		94	94	104	292

== Sports ==
- Aquatics ()
  - Diving ()
  - Swimming ()
- Athletics ()
- Boxing ()
- Cycling ()
- Fencing ()
- Lawn bowls ()
- Rowing ()
- Weightlifting ()
- Wrestling ()

Demo Sports:

- Equestrian ()
- Polo ()

Preceded by Vancouver	British Empire and Commonwealth Games; Cardiff; VI British Empire and Commonwealth Games	Succeeded by Perth
