= Canada at the 1958 British Empire Games =

Sporting event delegation

Flag of Canada from 1957 until 1965

Canada took part at the 1958 British Empire and Commonwealth Games Cardiff, (Wales, United Kingdom). With a total of 27 medals, Canada ranked tenth on the medal tally.

== Medals ==
	(gold)	(silver)	(bronze)	Total
Canada	1	10	16	27

== Individual medals ==
=== Gold ===
Rowing:

- Men's Eight team

=== Silver ===
Athletics:

- Robert Reid, Men's Pole vault
- Jack Smyth, Men's Triple Jump

Fencing:

- Men's Épée team

Rowing:

- Men's Coxless Fours team
- Men's Coxed Fours team

Swimming:

- Men's 4×110 yd medley relay team
- Women's 4×110 yd freestyle relay team

Diving:

- Bill Patrick, Men's 3 Metres Springboard
- Irene MacDonald, Women's 3 Metres Springboard

Weightlifting:

- Dave Baillie, Men's Heavyweight - Overall

=== Bronze ===
Athletics:

- Mike Agostini, Men's 100 yards
- Terry Tobacco, Men's 440 yards
- Hans Moks, Men's Javelin throw
- Jackie Gelling, Women's Shot Put
- Women's 4 x 110 yards relay team

Boxing:

- Raymond Galante, Men's Light Welterweight
- James Arthur Walters, Men's Light Middleweight
- Robert Piau, Men's Middleweight

Swimming:

- Robert Wheaton, Men's 110 yards backstroke
- Men's 4 x 220 yards freestyle relay team
- Margaret Iwasaki, Women's 110 yards butterfly
- Women's 4 x 110 yards medley relay team

Weightlifting:

- Marcel Gosselin, Men's Bantamweight - Overall
- Adrian Gilbert, Men's Middleweight - Overall

Wrestling:

- Fred Flannery, Men's Flyweight
- Bob Steckle, Men's Light Heavyweight
