= St Mellons =

District of Cardiff, Wales

Coordinates: 51.52721°N 3.10414°W

St Mellons: Welsh: Llaneirwg
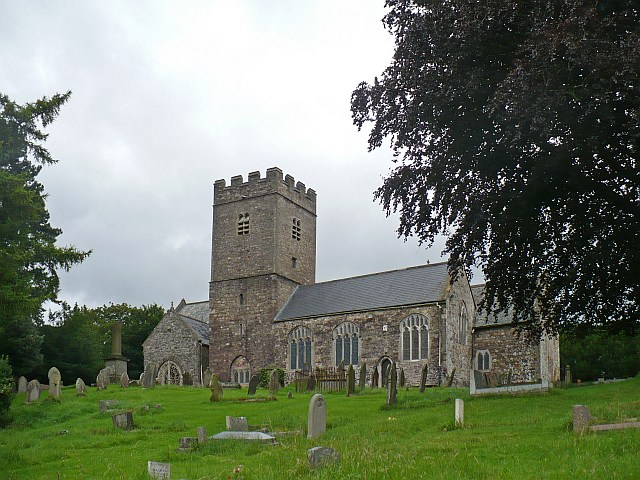
- St Mellons Church, Church Lane

- Location within Cardiff
- OS grid reference: ST235815
- Community: Trowbridge (1996– )
- Principal area: Cardiff
- Preserved county: South Glamorgan
- Country: Wales
- Sovereign state: United Kingdom
- Post town: CARDIFF
- Postcode district: CF3
- Dialling code: 029
- Police: South Wales
- Fire: South Wales
- Ambulance: Welsh
- UK Parliament: Cardiff East

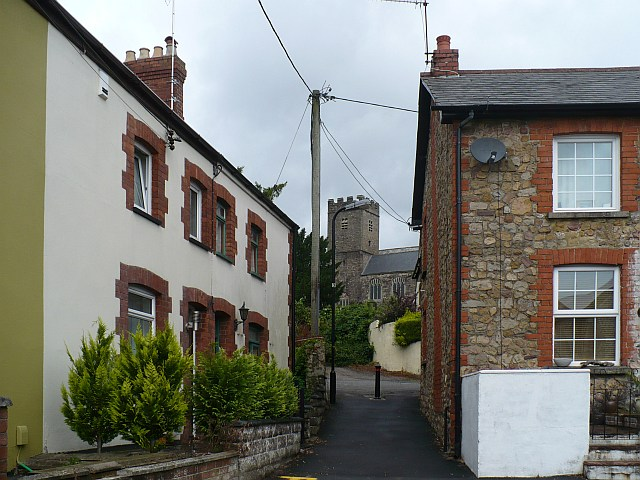
Old St Mellons

St Mellons (Welsh: Llaneirwg) is a district and suburb of eastern Cardiff, the capital city of Wales. Prior to 1996, St Mellons was the name given to the community largely north of Newport Road (B4487) which included the old St Mellons village. After 1996, the old community was divided and renamed as Old St Mellons and Pontprennau, with the newer, much larger area of modern housing and business parks to the south of Newport Road retaining the St Mellons name. Historically in Monmouthshire, St Mellons became part of South Glamorgan and Cardiff in 1974.

== History ==
St Mellons village began as a small commercial centre in the historic county of Monmouthshire, relying heavily on rural agriculture, farming and travel. Owners of coach houses or coaching inns would cater for travellers using Newport Road, the old Roman Road between Cardiff and London.

St Mellons became a community (the lowest tier of local government) and part of the city of Cardiff district of South Glamorgan under the Local Government Act 1972 on 1 April 1974. The St Mellons community was divided and renamed in 1996: Old St Mellons was created from the eastern part (largely the Old St Mellons ward). The remaining part of the St Mellons community became Pontprennau.

When people refer to St Mellons today, they are often not talking about the historic St Mellons, but the considerably larger and more modern housing estate which has been built to the south and east. The newer estate has retained the name 'St Mellons'. Many buildings in Old St Mellons date back to the 19th century, while the vast majority of buildings in St Mellons were built in the late 20th and early 21st centuries.

Vaendre Hall off Vaendre Close was built in 1850 for the industrialist John Cory. It sits on a 4-acre estate, having been sold with 18 acres in 1893. It is bordered by St Mellons golf course.

=== Origins of the name ===
The English name St Mellons is believed to be derived from the 6th-century Saint Melaine who became Bishop of Rennes in Brittany, rather than the more legendary 4th-century Mellonius, Bishop of Rouen. One of these bishops is known to have been born and brought up in the area where the estate now exists, though stories of the two have become hopelessly confused in many biographies over the years leaving historians unsure as to which is which.

The Welsh translation of St Mellons is Llaneirwg which is made up of Llan, a Welsh word meaning 'enclosure', and the personal-name Eirwg or Eurwg. Wales was originally evangelised by Celtic monks whose practice was to move into an area, and erect small premises within a fenced area – 'the enclosure'. From here they continued their work and subsequently a church would be erected on the site. The extent of the missionary activity in Wales is shown by the number of place names beginning with 'Llan', which is generally followed by the name of the missionary monk who founded the church in that place. In the case of Llaneirwg, Eurwg is the name of a mythical King of Gwent. Eurwg is said to have lived on the hill at St Mellons during the Romano-British era. He and his people were converted to Christianity and baptised in the nearby Rhymney River. Eurwg's church was erected near the site of the former church of 1360 and the area has since been known as Llaneirwg, literally "Church of Eirwg/Eurwg".

== Governance ==
The modern St Mellons is included in the Trowbridge community and electoral ward which currently has three seats on Cardiff Council.

St Mellons (or Trowbridge) does not have a community council and the area falls outside the boundaries of Old St Mellons Community Council.

== The area ==
The modern St Mellons is included in the Trowbridge community and electoral ward (Old St Mellons combines with neighbouring Pontprennau to become a Pontprennau & Old St Mellons ward). The 2001 Census put the population of Trowbridge as 14,801, the 4th most populated ward in Cardiff. Located on the eastern edge of Cardiff, St Mellons is bordered by the unitary authority of Newport.

Pontprennau	Old St Mellons	Castleton
Llanrumney	St Mellons	Marshfield
Trowbridge	Wentloog	Peterstone

=== Facilities ===
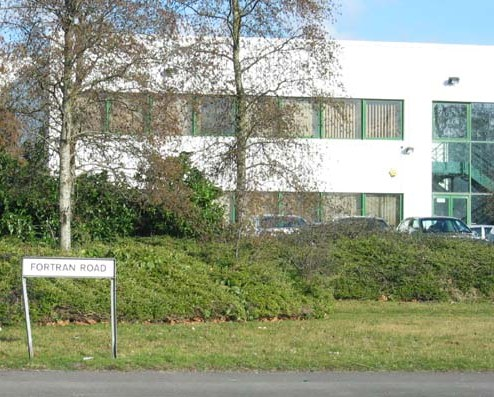

The area is home to two major retail complexes. The largest features a Tesco petrol station and superstore, which hit the headlines in January 2010 when it banned customers from shopping in their nightwear, and a parade of small retail units including a hairdresser, solicitor, betting shop, dentist, fish & chip takeaway and newsagent.

The other complex, approximately one mile away, has among others, two previously empty supermarket units which once belonged to Hyper Value and Kwik Save until both companies went into liquidation in 2006 and 2007. The What! shop now occupies the two previous Kwik Save and Hyper Value premises.

There are a number of sports and leisure facilities dotted around the district, including floodlit outdoor courts, playing fields and children's play parks, as well as a job centre and St Mellons Library. Hendre Lake Park, situated near the mainline railway, is a park and man-made lake popular with local fishermen.

The Beacon Centre

Towards the south of the estate is the Beacon Centre, a community centre created in the early 2000s. The centre runs a wide variety of groups and events for the community. The centre is home to the Beacon Church, an Elim Pentecostal church.

Shops and public houses

In Old St Mellons are a Texaco petrol station, newsagent and convenience store, fish & chip shop and hairdresser. The Post Office closed in 2009. There are also four public houses situated in close proximity to each other along Newport Road: The Church Inn, The Poachers Arms, Ty'r Winch and The Fox & Hounds (widely believed to be one of the oldest pubs in Cardiff). These establishments were able to gain extra business on Sundays by exploiting the Sunday Closing (Wales) Act 1881. The act prohibited the sale of alcohol in Welsh establishments on the Sabbath, but St Mellons was in the ancient county of Monmouthshire, where the act did not take effect until 1921.

Public houses in Old St Mellons

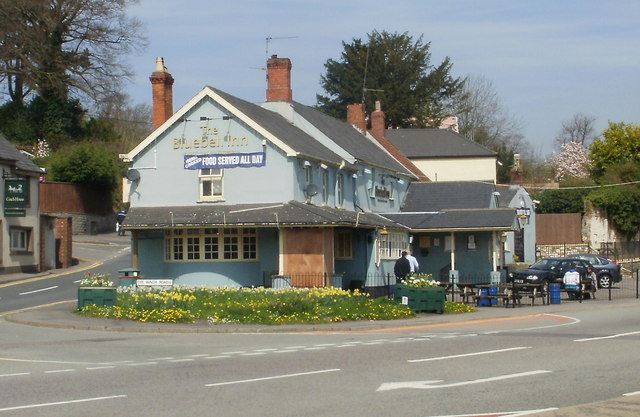
The Church Inn

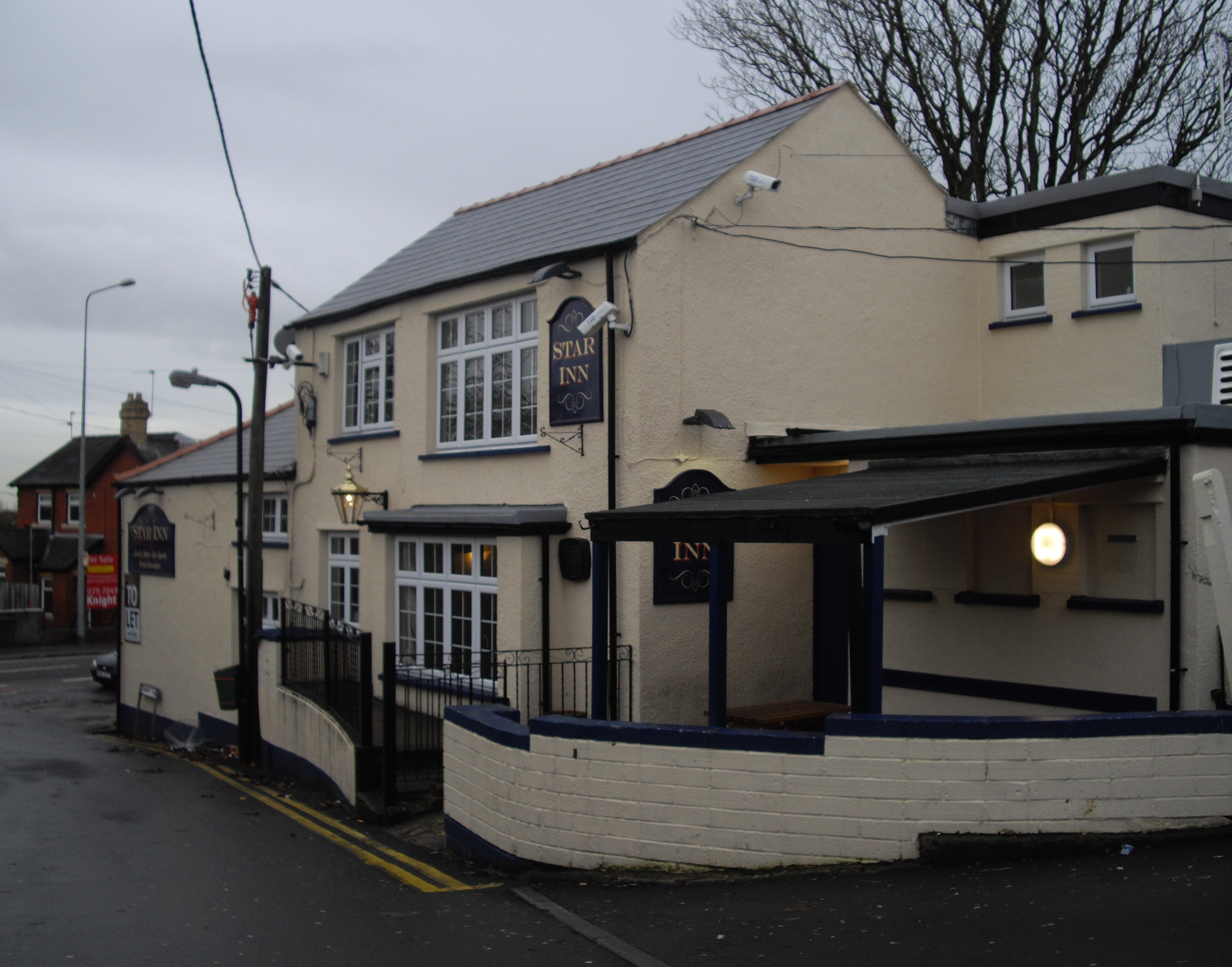
The Poachers Arms

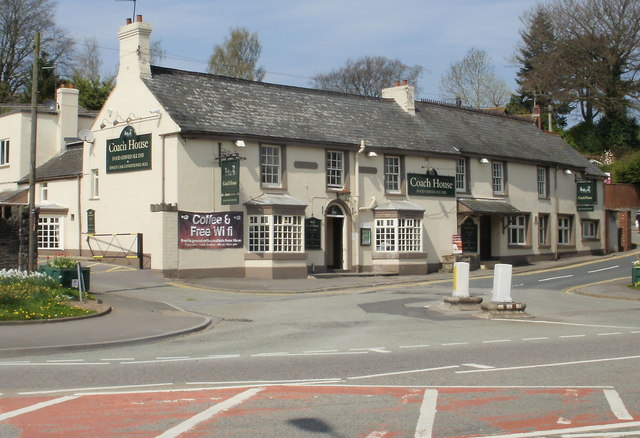
Ty'r Winch

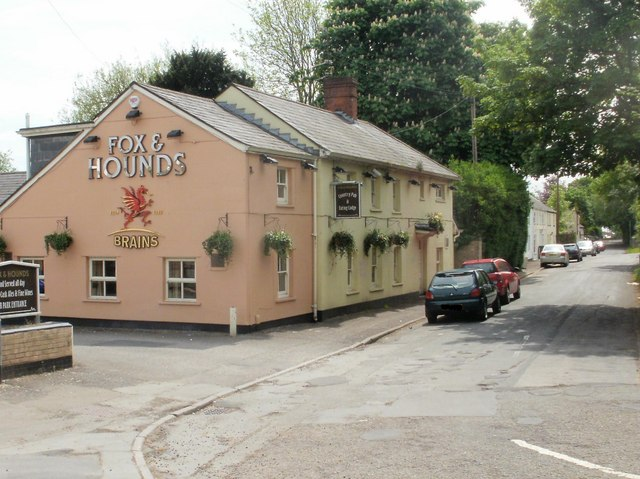
The Fox & Hounds

=== Education ===
St Mellons has 5 state primary schools: Meadowlane Primary, Bishop Childs Church in Wales Primary, Oakfield Primary, Willowbrook Primary and St. Mellons Church in Wales Primary. It also has a private school, St John's College, Cardiff, amongst the best performing schools in Wales, based on results. The building and surrounding fields were part of the Ty-to-Maen convalescent house, which only closed in the 1970s. The surrounding land was sold off for housing in the late 1990s following the death of the house's former owner William Nicholls, who now has a street on the estate named after him.

There are no learning institutions in this suburb for secondary, tertiary or higher education students (other than for fee-payers at St John's College). Two secondary schools in the Rumney/Llanrumney area nearby, Eastern High School and St Illtyd's Catholic High School (St. Illtyd's also admits non-Catholics), mop up most secondary school pupils, who are expected to travel by bus or car to these establishments from St Mellons (at their own expense). Proposals in former years for a secondary school in the Tesco/Cath Cobb Woods area have been abandoned and strategically forgotten about.

Tertiary education is offered nearby at the Cardiff and Vale College, Rumney or St David's Catholic College, Cyncoed (which also admits non-Catholics).

=== Business park ===
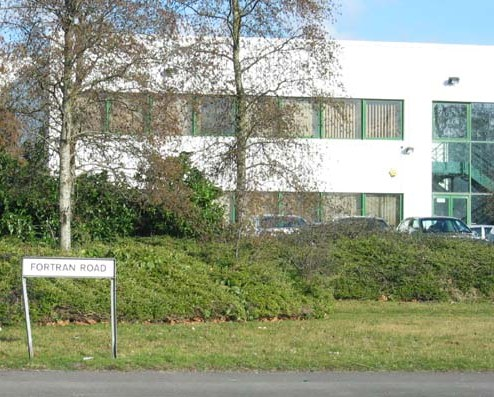
St Mellons Business Park, Fortran Road

The St Mellons Business Park is a collection of large-scale business parks located on low-lying land east of St Mellons considered to be Cardiff's green belt. It has a large number of factories and office units which have been (or are still) occupied by such companies as Capita, Gilesports, TBI and Lloyds TSB. A number of roads in and around the business parks are named after computer programming languages, namely Pascal, COBOL and Fortran.

=== Conservation area ===
Old St Mellons has been deemed an area of special architectural or historical interest and lies in a conservation area which Cardiff County Council first adopted in 1977. The area was reassessed and updated in July 2007 to cover a smaller land area. A number of Grade II listed buildings lie inside the boundary of the conservation area including the Church Inn and Poachers Arms public houses, St Johns College and the two churches.

=== Coastal defences ===
Much of the newer estates were built on the Wentloog Levels, areas of low-lying farmland which regularly became flooded until they were reclaimed from the sea during Roman times. A system of drainage reens and sluice gates together with a seawall which runs from the River Usk in the east to the Rhymney River in the west protect the area from the risk of coastal flooding as the land is still only a few metres above sea level.

=== Wildlife ===
Despite large-scale development, a lot of wildlife can still be seen, especially to the eastern fringe: foxes, rabbits, grey squirrels, buzzards, herons, egrets, moorhens, swans, mallards, green woodpeckers and many other birds are a common sight.

== Hendre Lakes Development ==
Hendre Lakes Business Park is a large commercial property scheme proposed on land to the east of St Mellons by Cardiff Parkway Developments. Other investors in the project include Investec and the Welsh Government, which has a 10% equity stake.

The offices and other proposed facilities would be served by a new Cardiff Parkway railway station as well as park and ride facilities.

Subject to planning, work on both projects is expected to start with the station and a first phase of 300,000 sq ft of 900,000 sq ft of development at Cardiff Hendre Lakes, completed in 2023.

== Transport ==
=== Roads ===
All main roads and side streets in St Mellons have a 20 mph speed limit, with the exception of the A48 and Cypress Drive, where some sections have a 30 mph limit. There are no permanent speed cameras anywhere in the estate. In 2007, a number of road-related deaths led to residents campaigning for traffic calming measures to be implemented before more lives were lost. In late 2008, Cardiff Council began implementing new traffic calming measures outside the primary schools, including zebra crossings and speed bumps. These measures are now commonplace across St Mellons.

The area is located next to Junction 29a of the A48 (M)/Eastern Avenue Junction, where the A48 continues eastbound through Coedkernew and the A48(M) rejoins the M4.

=== Proposed M4 relief road ===
Plans are in place to utilise the area's motorway links by creating a new dual carriageway. The St Mellons / Wentloog Link road would become part of the Cardiff Ring Road, crossing the railway line to serve the existing freight terminal and industrial land built on the Wentloog Levels.

The plans, however, are not without objection from local residents who fear their health, safety and the value of their homes will be affected. The road is planned to be built on low-lying marshland, which is a designated Site of Special Scientific Interest (SSSI).

=== Buses ===
Cardiff Bus services 30, 44 and 45 serve the area. Services run frequently between the area and Cardiff City Centre.

=== Rail ===
There is no local railway station, despite Hendre Lake park being adjacent to the Freight Terminal Port, situated along the main line between Cardiff and Newport. The nearest main line station is Cardiff Central.

In July 2017, Transport Secretary Chris Grayling gave his backing to a privately financed £25 million station at St Mellons, to be known as Cardiff Parkway. Planning permission was granted in 2022, but the Welsh Government intervened with a review, citing the broader national interest of the project. The project was finally approved in January 2025.

== Shopping ==
- Cardiff Garden Centre (1952–present)

== See also ==
- Cefn Mably
