= Rhymney River =

River in the Rhymney Valley, Wales

Coordinates: 51°29′N 3°07′W

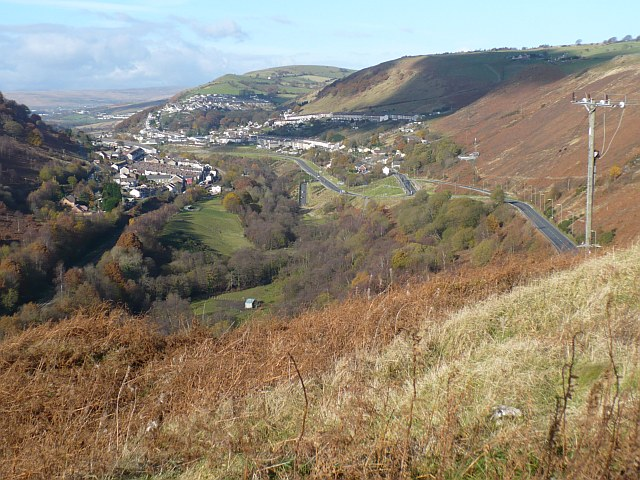
The Rhymney Valley, north of Bargoed

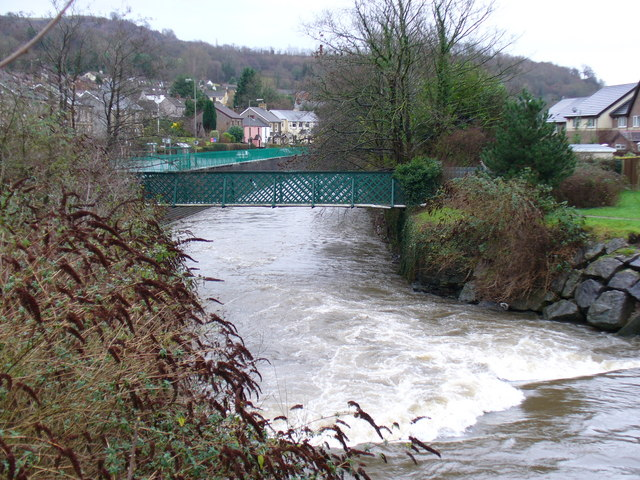
The river as it passes through Machen

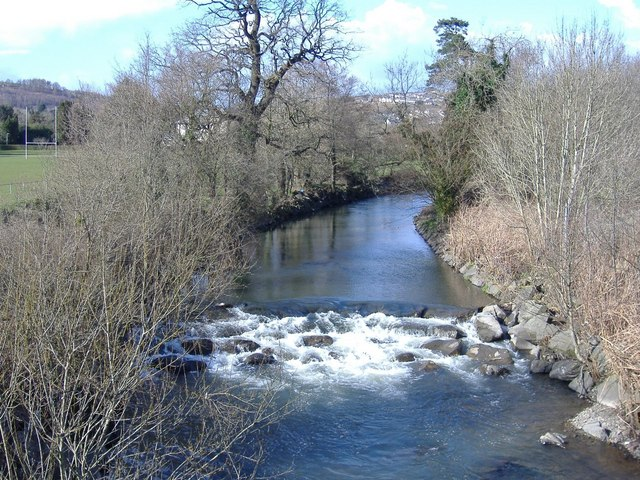
The river as it passes through Ystrad Mynach

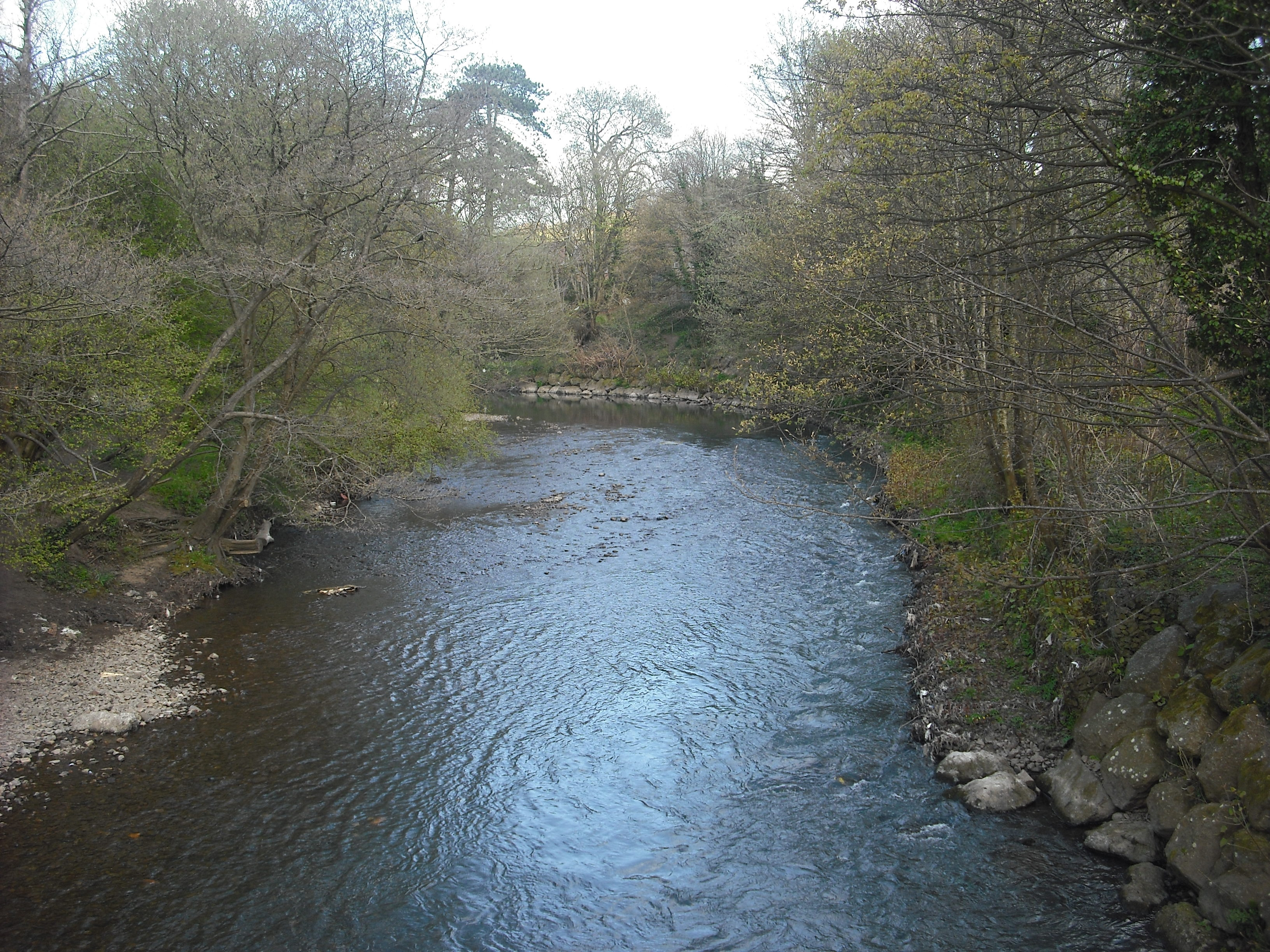
The river in its lower reaches, as it passes through Llanrumney on the eastern outskirts of Cardiff

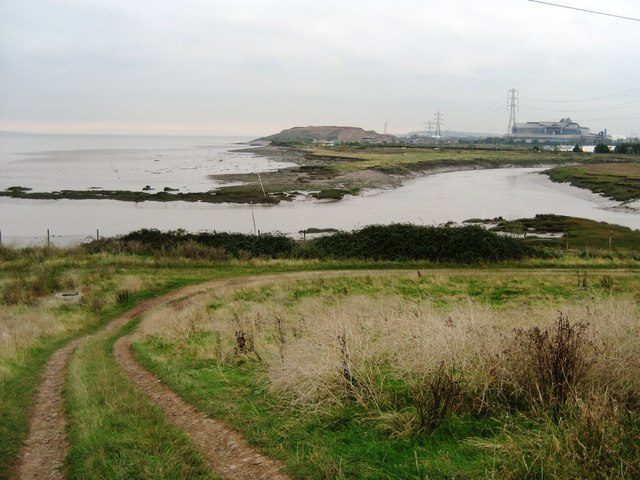
Mouth of the river, as it reaches the Severn Estuary just east of Cardiff

The Rhymney River (Welsh: Afon Rhymni) is a river in the Rhymney Valley, South East Wales, flowing through Cardiff into the Severn Estuary. The river formed the boundary between the historic counties of Glamorgan and Monmouthshire until in 1887, the parishes east of the river, Rumney and St Mellons, were transferred from the jurisdiction of Newport, to Cardiff in Glamorgan.

The river flows south from its source near Rhymney through New Tredegar, Bargoed, Ystrad Mynach, and Llanbradach to Caerphilly at the southern end of the Rhymney Valley. Then past Bedwas, Trethomas, Machen, Draethen, Llanrumney and Rumney and its estuary into the River Severn.

The Rhymney Valley was created as a glacial valley. Sourced within the valley, on the southern edge of the Brecon Beacons, the Rhymney River descends steeply through the town of New Tredegar towards Ystrad Mynach, and then onwards south across a flat plain before entering the Severn Estuary to the east of Cardiff. The villages of Groesfaen, Deri, Pentwyn and Fochriw are located in the Darran Valley and not the Rhymney Valley, which joins the Rhymney Valley at Bargoed.

Covering a distance of 30 miles (48 km), the catchment is divided into two distinct parts:

- The upper reaches: steep-sided, wet, mountainous upper valley
- The lower reaches: flatter wider valley below Machen, where the river assumes a lowland meandering character

Being located in part of the South Wales coalfield and South Wales Valleys iron-producing area, the resultant black river had poor water quality through most of the 19th and 20th centuries. The river is culverted in many of its upper sections, including a tunnel under the former factory complexes in Rhymney, exiting at Pontlottyn. Since the closure of the last of the coal mines in the late 1980s, the water has become much cleaner and is now full of fish and insect life and supports plenty of other wildlife. The river now supports a healthy stock of grayling and natural brown trout, and much work has been undertaken to remove former industrial restrictions on the river to allow the fish to gain access to its upper reaches.

== Protection ==
Rhymney River is protected by Natural Resources Wales and the South East Wales Rivers Trust, which is a member of The Rivers Trust.

== See also ==
- Cardiff Rivers Group
