= Eastern High School, Cardiff =

Eastern High School
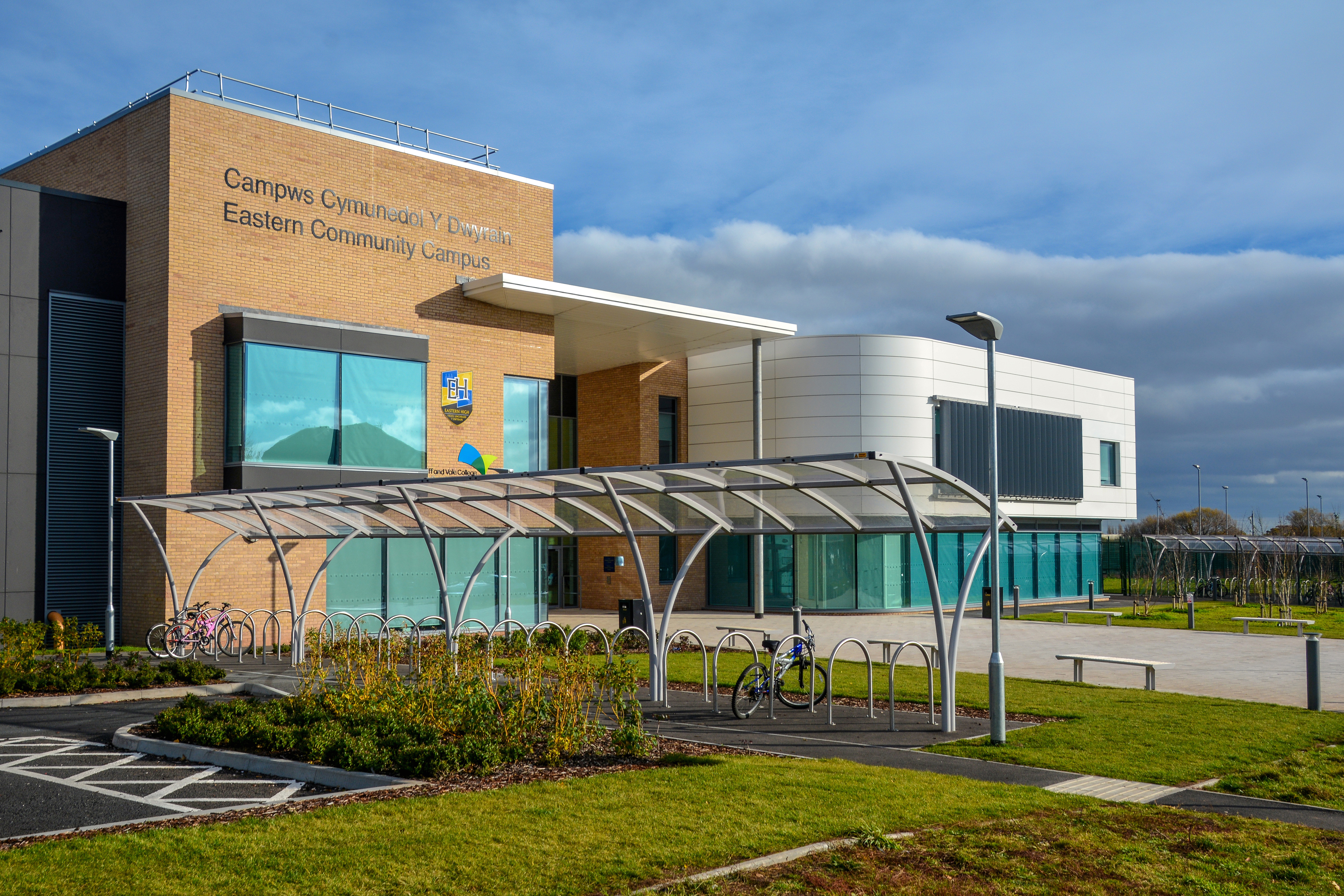

Location
- Eastern Community Campus, Trowbridge Road; Rumney; Cardiff, CF3 1XZ; Wales; 51°30′48″N 3°6′38″W

Information
- Type: Community
- Established: September 2014
- Head teacher: Jonathan Angle
- Years offered: 7–11
- Gender: Co-educational (male and female)
- Age: 11 to 16
- Enrolment: 884 (2014)
- Language: English
- Website: www.easternhigh.cardiff.sch.uk

Eastern High School is an English medium co-educational, community school in the Rumney area of Cardiff, Wales.The school serves the communities of Rumney, Llanrumney, Trowbridge and St Mellons on the eastern side of Cardiff. It opened in September 2014 on site of the old Rumney High School. It moved to its new home at the Eastern Community Campus on Trowbridge Road in January 2018.
