= Cardiff and Vale College =

- Coleg Caerdydd a'r Fro (Welsh)

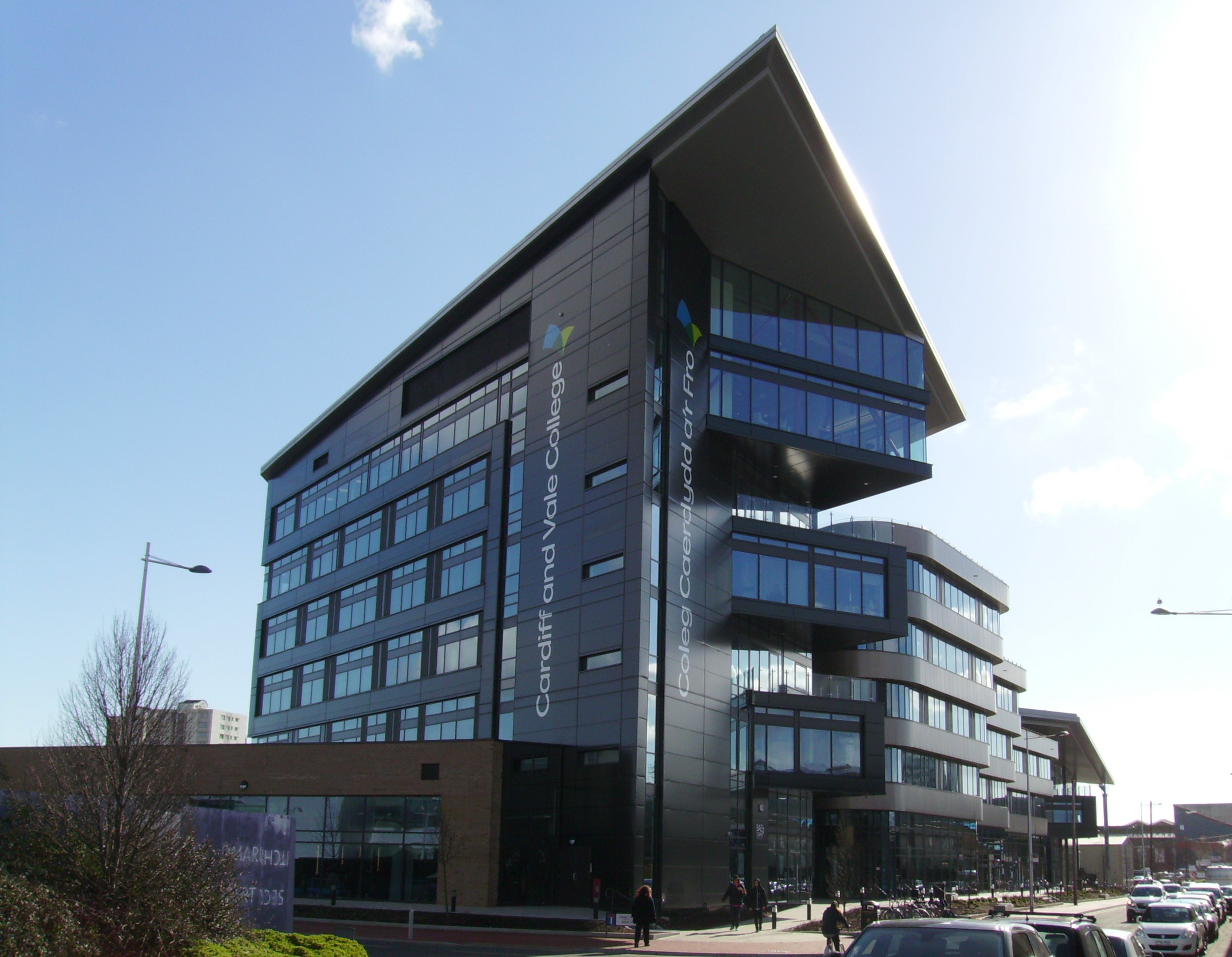
- City Centre Campus
- Cardiff and Barry; Wales

Information
- Motto: Inspirational. Inclusive. Influential.
- Established: September 2011; 14 years ago
- Chair: Geraint Evans
- Principal: Sharon James
- Chief Executive: Mike James
- Staff: 1,100
- Gender: coeducational
- Age: 16+
- Enrolment: 36,079

Cardiff and Vale College (Welsh: Coleg Caerdydd a'r Fro), abbreviated to CAVC, is a mixed-sex education further education college in Cardiff and the Vale of Glamorgan, Wales.

The college was formed in September 2011 by the merger of Barry College and Coleg Glan Hafren. The merger was a result of the Welsh Assembly Government encouraging colleges in Wales to collaborate so that it could maximise benefits for students. Cardiff and Vale College is the largest college in Wales. The college took control of the Cardiff International Sports Stadium from July 2015 on a peppercorn rent to Cardiff Council.

In 2015 a new main campus costing £45 million was opened in Dumballs Road, Cardiff, to cater for 4000 students. Facilities included 130 teaching rooms, film and dance studios, a theatre, a hair salon and spa and, on the top floor, a public bar and restaurant.

College sites in Cardiff and Barry
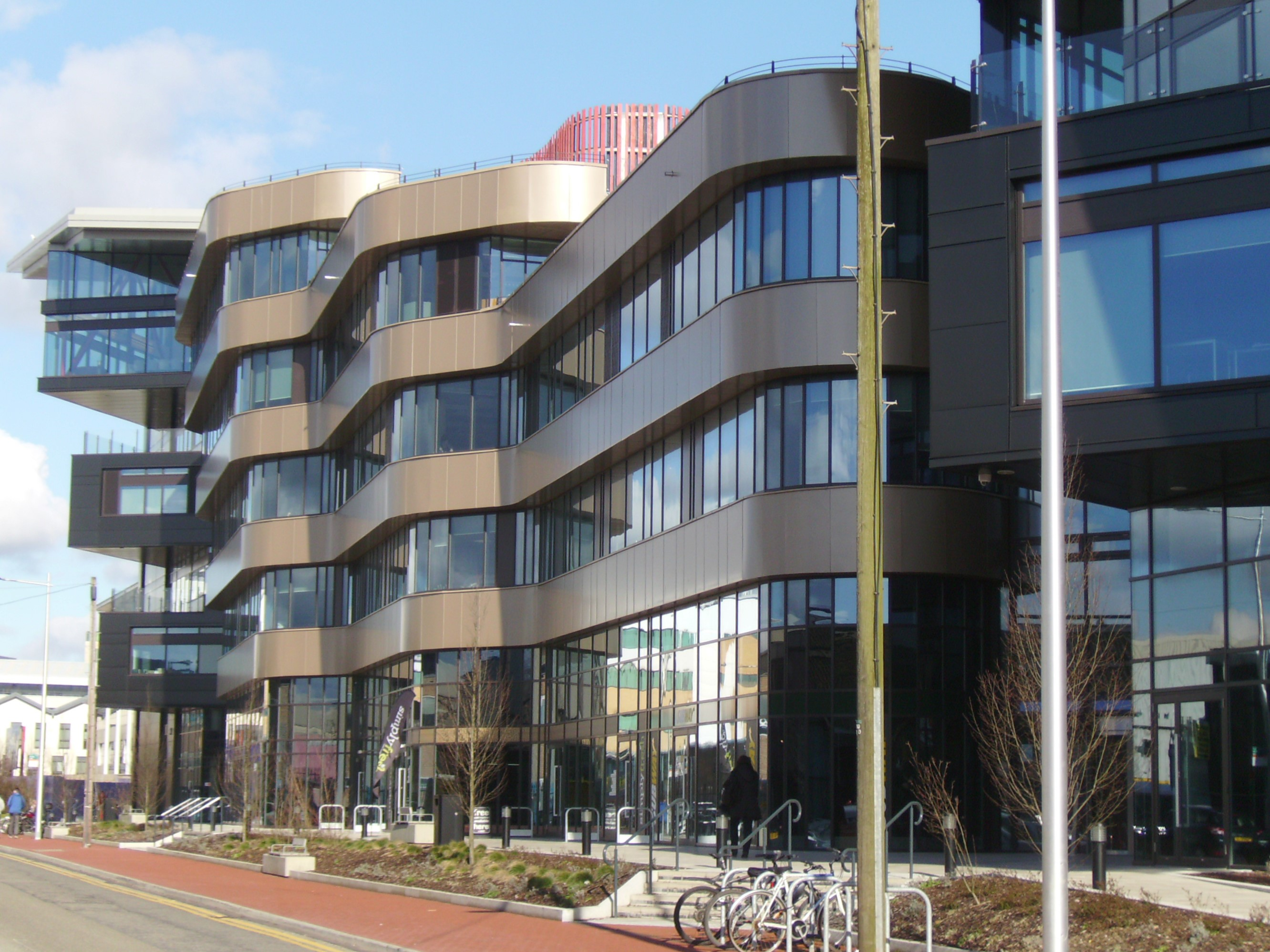
The main building of the City Centre Campus

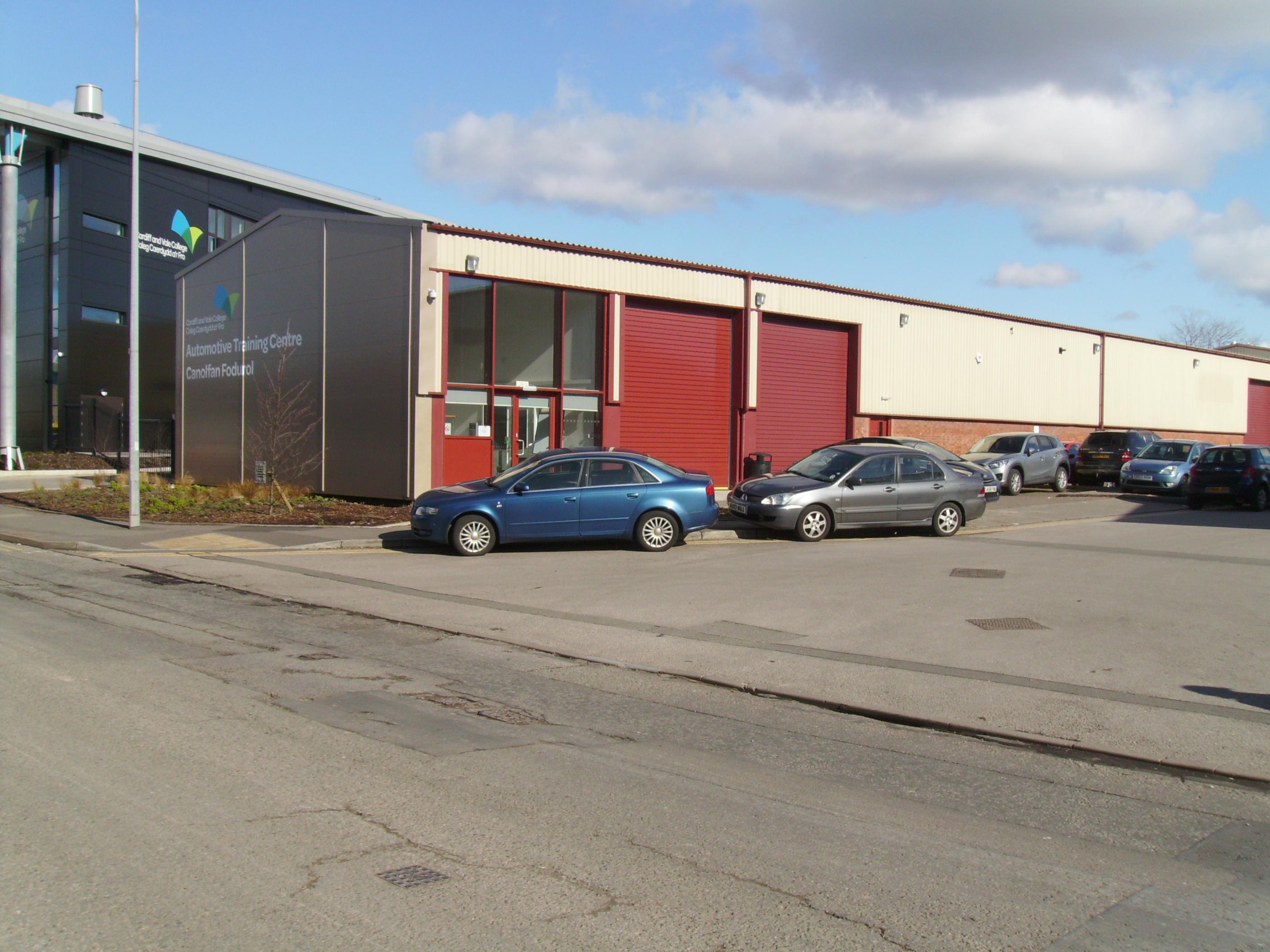
Automotive Training Centre

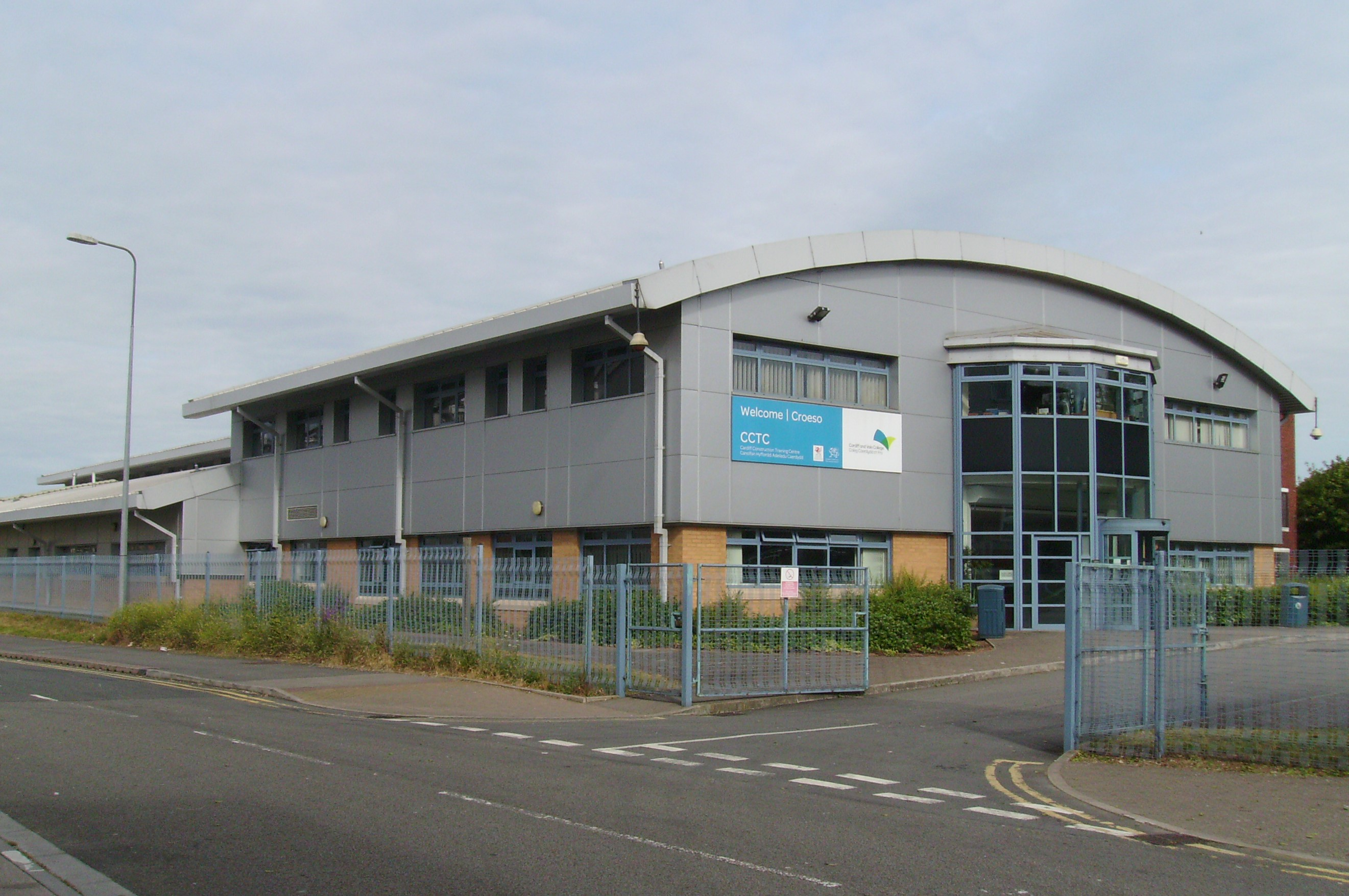
Construction Training Centre

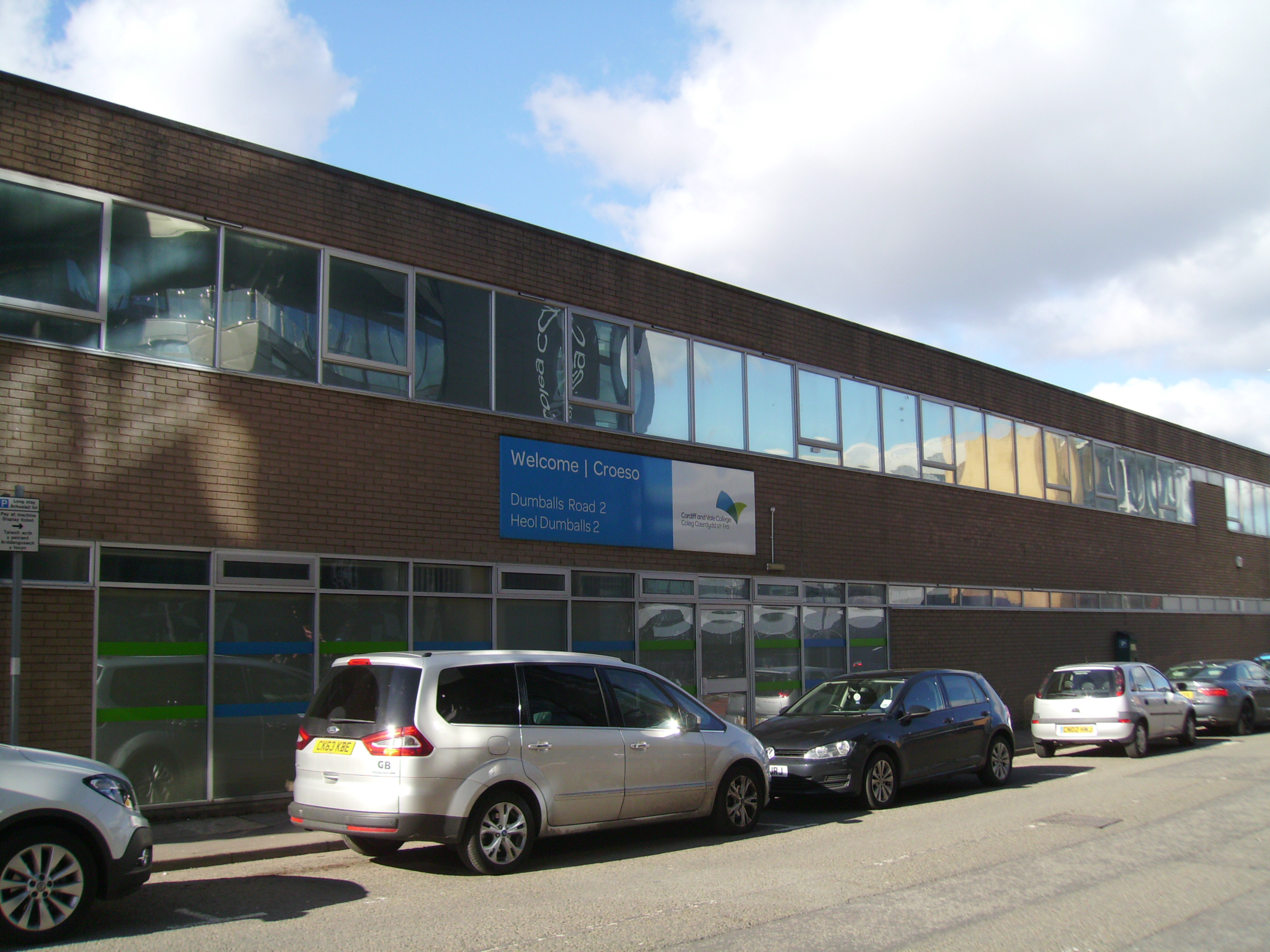
Building Services Centre [Dumballs Road 2]

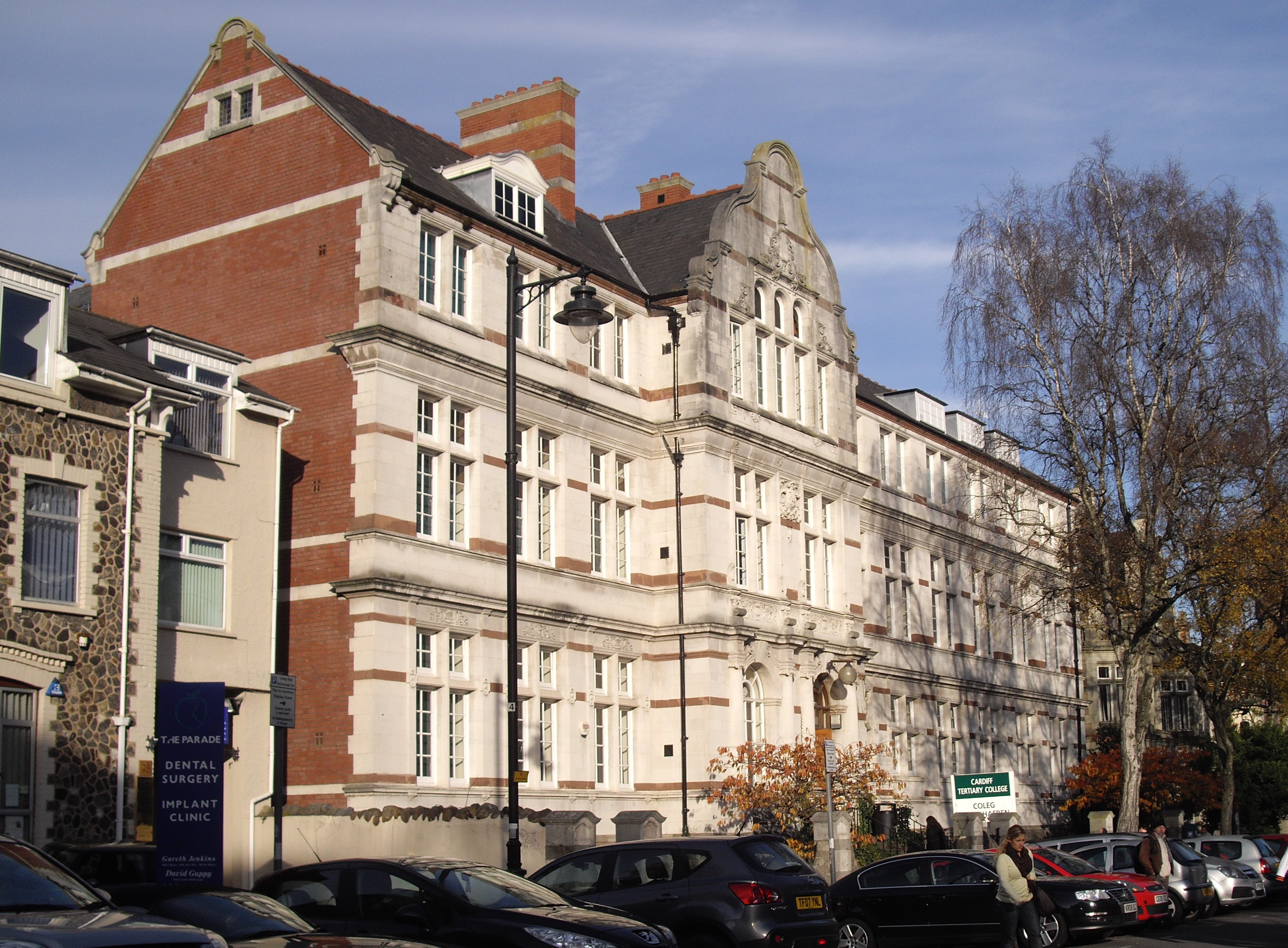
The Parade

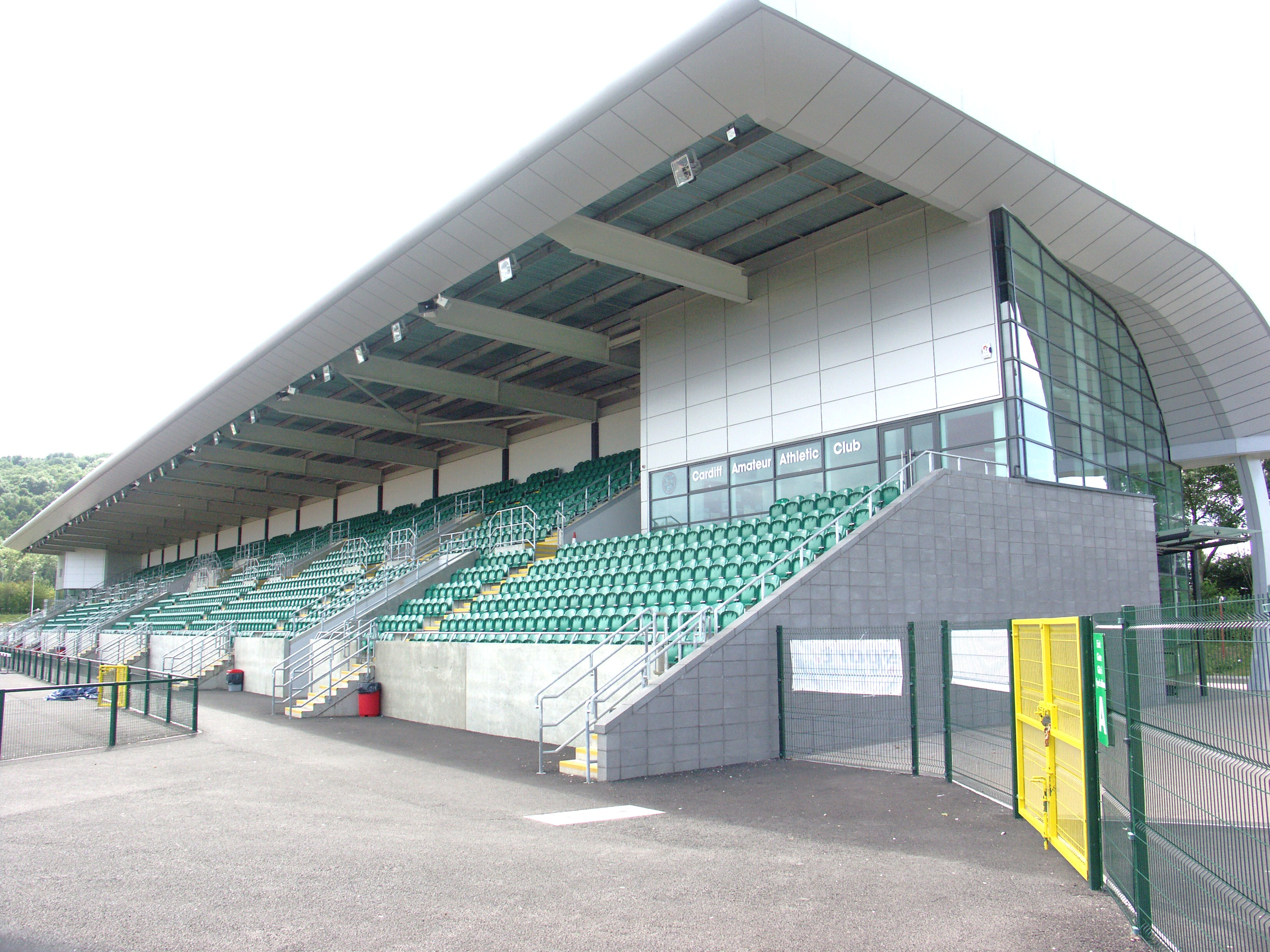
Cardiff International Sports Stadium

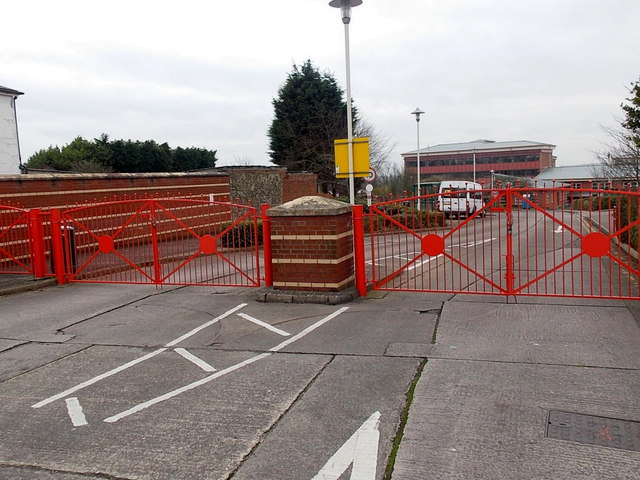
Barry Campus
