= Coleg Glan Hafren =

Former college in Cardiff, Wales

Coordinates: 51.513°N 3.110°W

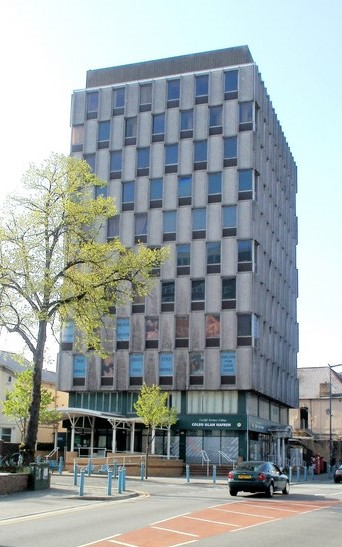
- The city centre campus at 35 The Parade
- Type: Further Education College
- Established: 1989
- Administrative staff: 500
- Students: 12,000
- Location: Cardiff, Wales
- Campus: Trowbridge Road, Rumney The Parade, Cardiff
- Website: http://www.cavc.ac.uk/en/

Coleg Glan Hafren, formerly Rumney College (and before that Rumney College of Technology), was a Further Education college based in Cardiff which merged with Barry College in September 2011 to form the new Cardiff and Vale College.

== Background ==
The college had over 12,000 students and provided over 800 courses, including A levels (including A level and AS level Business Studies), GCSE re-sits and languages; Business and Professional courses such as Law, Marketing and Accounting; Hair and Beauty; Access, ESOL and Open Door; Sport, Catering, Childcare and Travel and Tourism; Creative and Digital courses and Engineering and Construction Technology courses. The courses were provided to students from the age of 14, who may have studied while still at school or from the age of 16, up to the eldest student at the college, at 80 years old. There were also courses run for international students, under the college's British Council-accredited Cardiff College International.

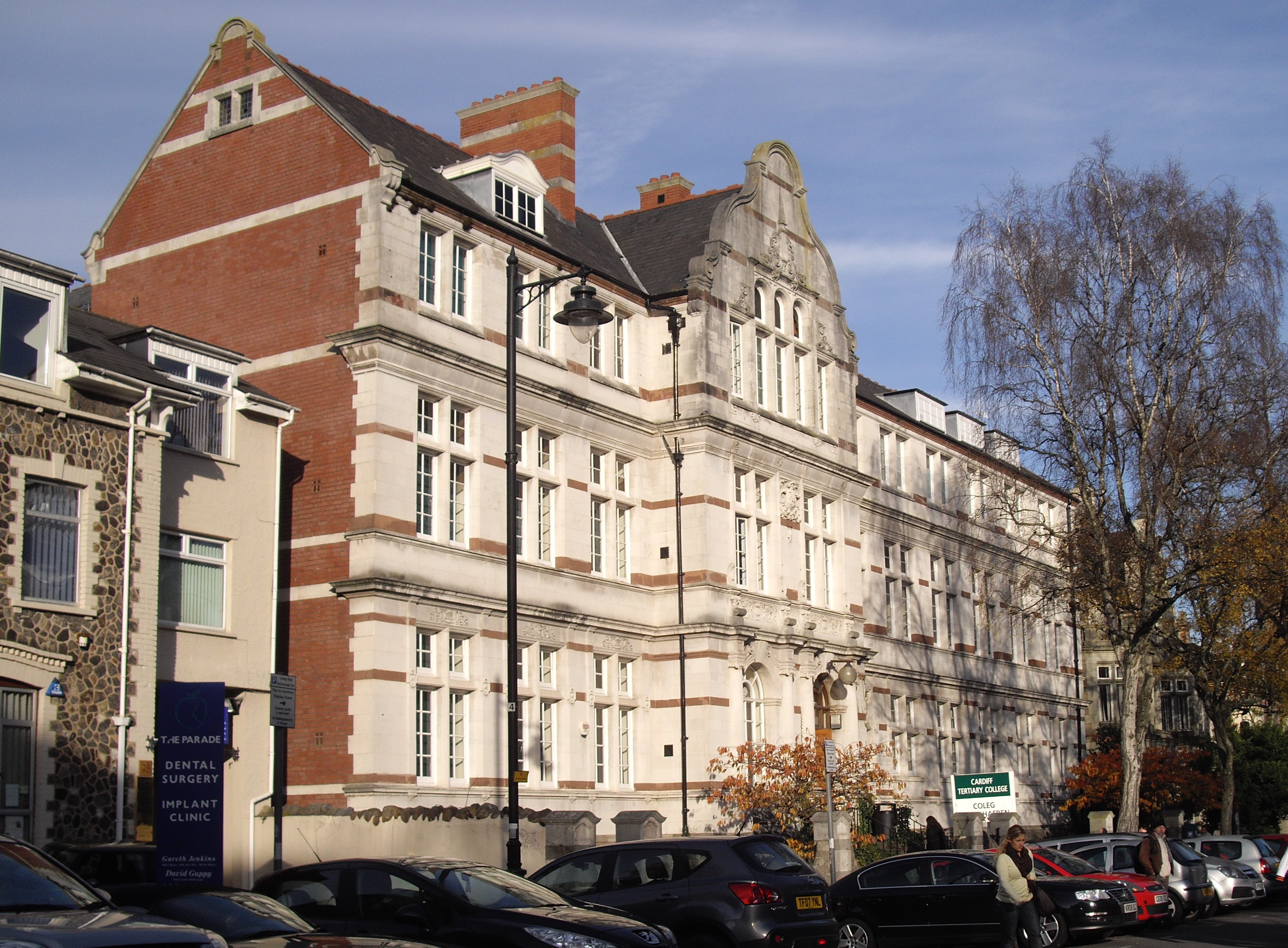
27 The Parade

The college had two campuses and four sites. One campus was on Trowbridge Road on the east side of the city. The other campus was in the city centre, with two sites on The Parade, at no. 27 and no. 35. The college also ran a commercial hair and beauty training salon in Cardiff's Castle Arcade, called the Design Academy. The college also provided courses at other sites, notably in Ely.

The college was formed in 1989 and was incorporated in 1993 under a royal charter. The name means "College by the River Severn" in English. The college was intended to serve the east-side of Cardiff, with another college intended to serve the west-side of Cardiff. There are six faculties within the college and the Acting Principal from 2009 until 2011.

Coleg Glan Hafren began merger discussions in 2008 with Barry College and in November 2010 announced they had agreed to merge, in response to the Welsh Government's Transformation Agenda which encouraged Welsh colleges to collaborate in order to maximise student benefits and improve student learning. They merged in September 2011 to form the new Cardiff and Vale College.
