= St Illtyd's Catholic High School =

Location
- Newport Rd; Cardiff, CF3 1XQ; Wales; 51°31′04″N 3°06′53″W

Information
- Type: Secondary comprehensive
- Mottoes: Sanitas, Scientia, Sanctitas ("Health, Knowledge, Holiness"); Signum Fidei ("Sign of Faith")
- Religious affiliation: Roman Catholic
- Established: 1924 (College); 1867 (Heathfield); 1987 (merger)
- Founders: De La Salle Brothers
- Department for Education URN: 401887 Tables
- Head teacher: David Thomas
- Gender: Coeducational
- Age: 11 to 16
- Website: http://www.stilltyds.org.uk/

St Illtyd's Catholic High School is a coeducational secondary school in Rumney, a district in the east side of the Welsh capital Cardiff. The school's namesake is Illtud, a 5th-century Welsh abbot and teacher.

== History ==
=== St Illtyd's College ===
St Illtyd's College was founded by the De La Salle Brothers in 1924 to educate boys from the local Catholic community and most pupils were of Irish Catholic descent. The early years of the school were difficult due to minimal funding. Troubles in the local coal industry and the Great Depression meant that many parents could not afford to pay the bare minimum school fees while wealthier Catholics chose to send their children to public schools. During the era of the tripartite system, the college became a voluntary aided grammar school and maintained that status until the system was abolished. It was the last remaining boys' aided grammar school in Wales. Originally located in Splott, it moved out of its cramped school grounds to a new campus overlooking the Bristol Channel in the 1960s. The Lasallian heritage is acknowledged by the five-pointed star and the motto "Signum Fidei" (Latin for "Sign of Faith"), the motto of the De La Salle Brothers, featured in the school crest.

=== Heathfield House School ===
Founded by the Sisters of Providence of the Institute of Charity (more commonly known as the Rosminian Sisters of Providence) in 1867, Heathfield House School was the oldest Catholic secondary school in Wales. It was called St Joseph's Grammar School at that time and located at David Street, Cardiff. In 1877 it moved to a building called Heathfield House, which subsequently gave the school its name. In 1953 it became a voluntary aided grammar school. It turned comprehensive in 1968 before becoming a sixth form college nine years later.

=== Merger ===
In 1987 St Illtyd's and Heathfield House merged to form the present coeducational school. The sixth form college was abolished as St David's Catholic College was opened instead.

== Caer Castell Camp ==
Caer Castell Camp lies within the grounds of the school. Caer Castell Camp is a motte and ditch scheduled monument and dates back to between 1066 and 1540 AD.

== Former pupils ==
=== St Illtyd's Catholic High School ===
- Dan Fish (b. 1990) – rugby union player

=== St Illtyd's Boys' College ===
- Dannie Abse (1923–2014) – poet
- Paul Flynn (1935–2019) – MP from 1987 to 2019 of Newport West
- Peter Gill (b. 1939) – playwright
- John James (1939–2018) – poet
- Walter Marshall, Baron Marshall of Goring (1932–1996) – chairman from 1982 to 1989 of the Central Electricity Generating Board (CEGB)
- Michael Mullett (1943–2026), historian
- Anthony Reynolds, musician and writer
- John Stewart (1927–1995) – diplomat and politician

=== Heathfield House School ===
- Deirdre Hine (b. 1937) – physician
