= Rumney, Cardiff =

District and community in Cardiff, Wales

Coordinates: 51.50895°N 3.13251°W

Rumney: Welsh: Tredelerch
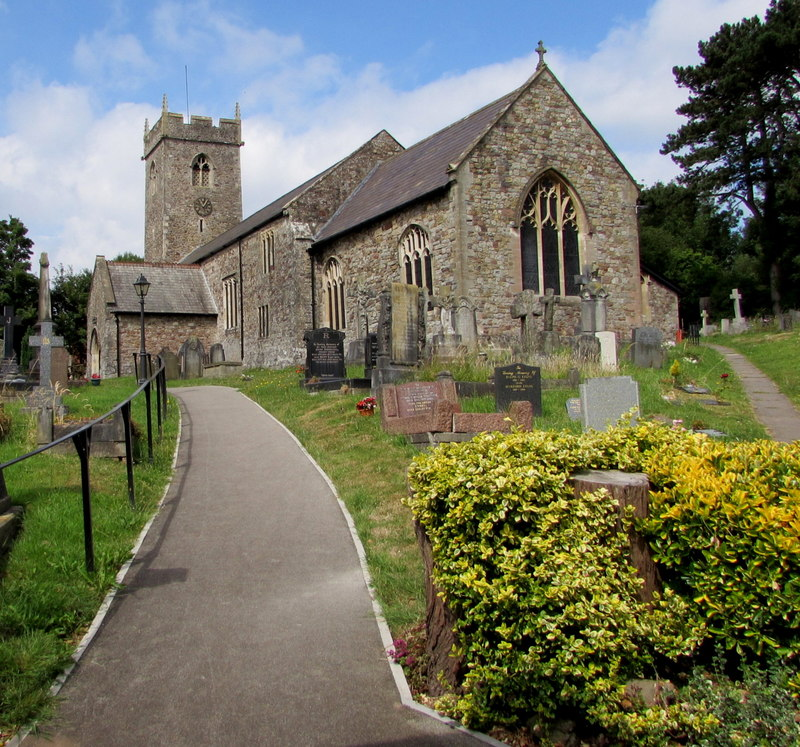
- St Augustine's Church, Rumney
- Population: 8,827 (2011 census)
- OS grid reference: ST215795
- Principal area: Cardiff
- Preserved county: South Glamorgan
- Country: Wales
- Sovereign state: United Kingdom
- Post town: CARDIFF
- Postcode district: CF3
- Dialling code: 029
- Police: South Wales
- Fire: South Wales
- Ambulance: Welsh
- UK Parliament: Cardiff East
- Senedd Cymru – Welsh Parliament: Cardiff South & Penarth
- List of places UK Wales Cardiff Map of the community

Rumney (Welsh: Tredelerch) is a district and community in the east of the city of Cardiff, Wales. It lies east of the Rhymney River, and was historically part of Monmouthshire. On 1 April 1938 the Cardiff Extension Act 1937 (1 Edw. 8 & 1 Geo. 6. c. cxxx) incorporated it into the county borough of Cardiff, although it remained part of the ceremonial county of Monmouth, and so at that stage part of England.

== Description ==
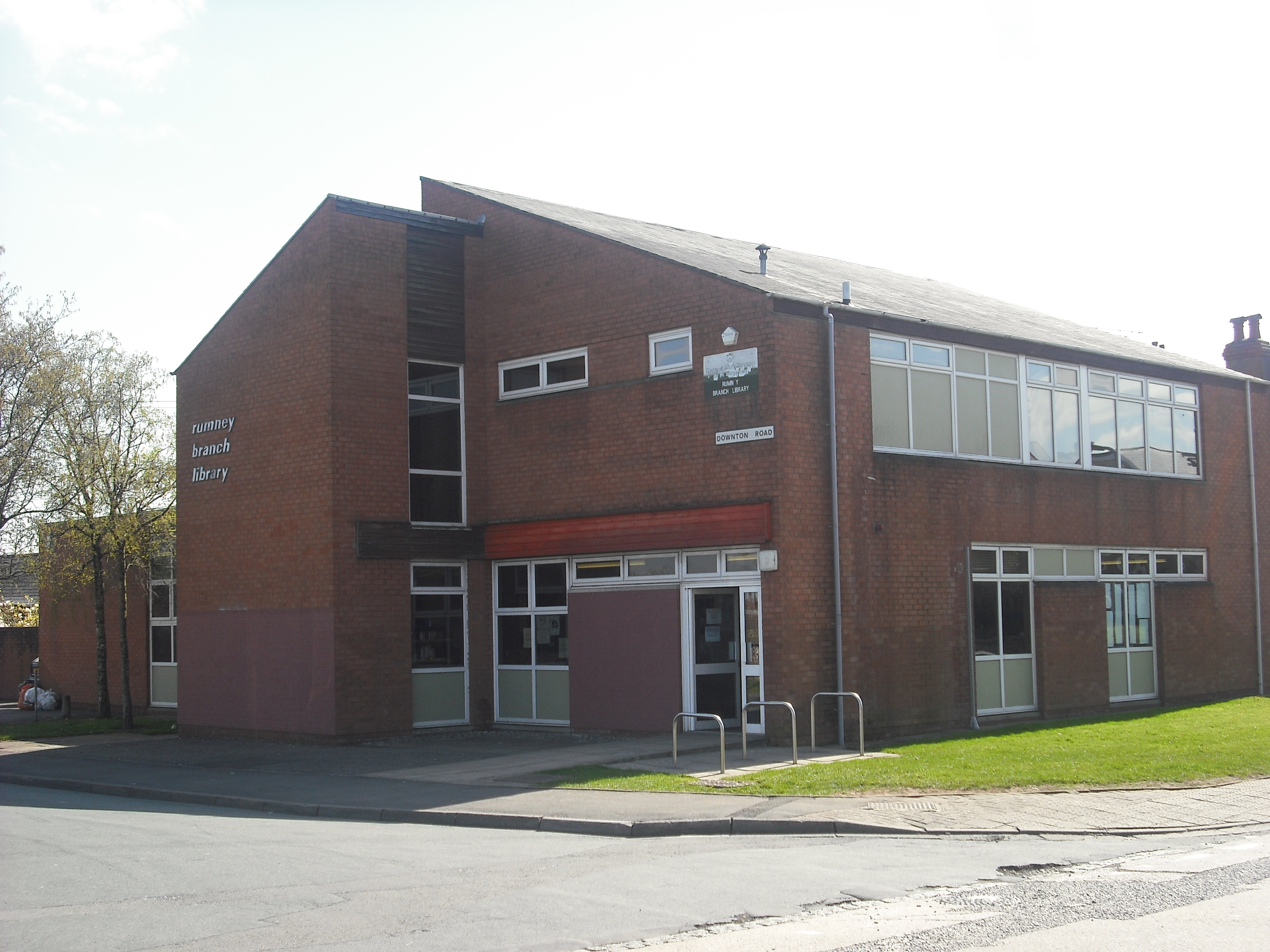
Rumney Library

This is a predominantly residential area with a variety of social and private housing. There are many places of worship in the area, local shops, beauty salons and Cafés, Rumney has a community charity based at Brachdy House called Rumney Forum, which is also home to the charity A Better Fit-School Uniform Donation. There are many shopping outlets on Newport Road as well as local shops at the top of Rumney Hill. New industrial and business estates have been developed alongside existing ones on Lamby Way providing employment opportunities.

Within the older sectors of the Rumney area are places of interest, such as the historic Rumney Pottery which is still in use today and also the remains of the old Rumney Castle which was a major stronghold on the South Wales coast. The remains of the castle were excavated in the late 70s and early 80s. An old quarry which is now being used as a children's park is situated off Ty Mawr Road (Ty Mawr – Welsh language for "Big House")

The Church in Wales parish church of St Augustine, dating from the 12th century, is located on the north side of Church Road. Schools in the area include Eastern High School and St Illtyd's Catholic High School.

The Rompney Castle pub, with a mock-medieval tower, was built on Wentloog Road in 1871. It closed due to the 2020-2021 Coronavirus lockdown. Plans to demolish it and replace it with apartments were rejected in 2022 by Cardiff Council planners.

== Transport ==
The area is on Cardiff Bus' 44/45 routes between Cardiff Central bus station and St Mellons and the 49/50 routes to Llanrumney. It is also served by the 30 service to Newport bus station.

== Governance ==
Rumney is both an electoral ward, and a community of the City of Cardiff. There is no community council for the area. It is bounded by the electoral wards of Pontprennau & Old St. Mellons to the north; Trowbridge to the east; Splott to the southwest; Penylan to the west; and Llanrumney to the northwest.

The electoral ward of Rumney was in the parliamentary constituency of Cardiff South & Penarth until the 2024 UK general election, subsequently it became part of the new Cardiff East constituency. It remains in the Cardiff South and Penarth Senedd constituency until 2026.
