= Trowbridge, Cardiff =

District and community in Cardiff, Wales

Coordinates: 51.51366°N 3.11101°W

Trowbridge
- Community and electoral ward
- Population: 16,194 (2011)
- OS grid reference: ST230800
- Principal area: Cardiff
- Country: Wales
- Sovereign state: United Kingdom
- Post town: Cardiff
- Postcode district: CF3
- Dialling code: +44-29
- Police: South Wales
- Fire: South Wales
- Ambulance: Welsh
- UK Parliament: Cardiff East
- Senedd Cymru – Welsh Parliament: Cardiff South & Penarth
- Councillors: 4
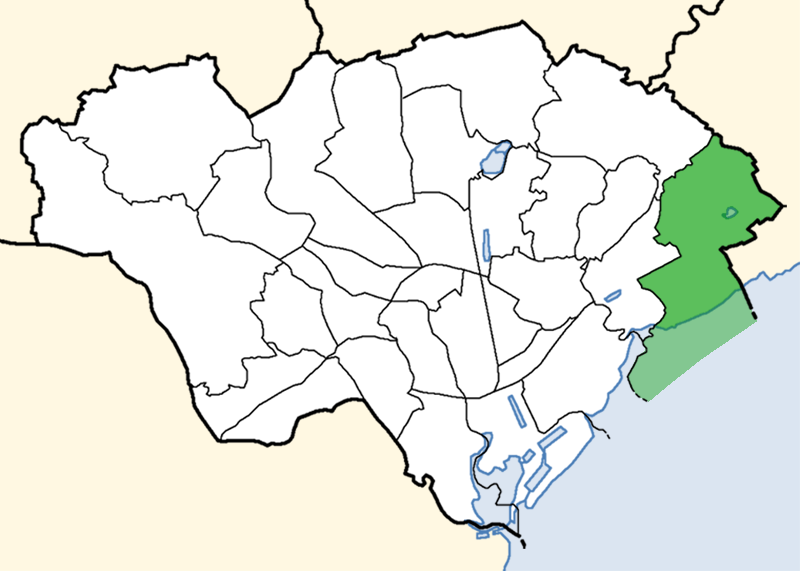
- List of places UK Wales Cardiff

Trowbridge is a district, community and coterminous electoral ward on the eastern edge of the city of Cardiff, capital of Wales.

The community and electoral ward includes some or all of the areas of the St Mellons estate and Trowbridge, as well as part of the Wentlooge Levels between the mainline railway and the coast. It is bounded by the village of Old St Mellons to the north; Marshfield (in Newport principal area) to the east; and Splott and Rumney to the west.

== History ==
Trowbridge largely dates from the second half of the 20th century, when housing spread east from Rumney onto the farmland of the area.

Until 1938, the area was part of the civil parish of Rumney, in the historic county of Monmouthshire.

== Governance ==
Trowbridge is both a community and an electoral ward for Cardiff Council. There is no community council for the area. Trowbridge was in the parliamentary constituency of Cardiff South & Penarth until the 2024 UK general election, subsequently it became part of the new Cardiff East constituency. It remains in the Cardiff South and Penarth Senedd constituency until 2026.

The Trowbridge electoral ward is represented by four councillors on Cardiff Council. At the Cardiff Council election on 4 May 2017 the ward elected three Labour Party councillors and one Liberal Democrat. Prior to this Trowbridge elected Labour councillors, with the exception of 2004 when a Liberal Democrat won a seat.

== Schools ==
Trowbridge Primary School.

St John Lloyd primary school.

== Places of interest ==
- Caldicot and Wentloog Levels
- Hendre Lake Park
- Crosbie's Pond

== Waste incinerator proposal ==
In 2019, plans for a new £150m waste incinerator plant was proposed by Mor Hafren Bio Power, off Newlands Road in Wentloog, Trowbridge. The facility would burn up to 200,000 tonnes of waste each year, while also generating 15 Megawatts of electricity. It would be only 3 miles from the Viridor plant in Splott. A campaign group was set up by Trowbridge residents and anti-incinerator campaigners.

A final decision on whether the Mor Hafren facility can proceed was expected in 2020.
