= Listed buildings in Grangetown, Cardiff =

There are seven listed buildings in Grangetown, Cardiff, Wales and they are all listed Grade II. Grangetown developed as a suburb in the second half of the nineteenth century, on what had previously been farmland to the south of Cardiff.

Grade II listed buildings are of special architectural or historical interest.

== Listed buildings ==
Name	Photograph	Grade	Date	Location	Description
Central Workshops, Pendyris Street	Central Cardiff Workshops, now the Tramshed	II	1800	51.4752°N 3.1859°W	Previously the Central Cardiff Tramways Depot and workshops. Used by the Council since the 1950s as a servicing depot for its vehicles. Put up for sale in March 2013 and due to be transformed into an Arts Centre. A 1000-person capacity music venue, Tramshed, opened its doors in October 2015.
Former Sewerage Pumping Station, Penarth Road	Pumping Station	II		51.4568°N 3.1983°W	Now an antiques salesroom known as The Pumping House.
Gas Holder, off Ferry Road	Gas Holder	II		51.4613°N 3.1890°W	
Grange Farm House, Stockland Street	Grange Farm	II	Late 1500s	51.46784°N 3.18820°W	Believed to date from the late 1500s, built on the site of an earlier Grange. There are possible remains of an earlier building, a blocked door, of a pointed shape, in the north wall.
St Paul's Church, Paget Street/Bromsgrove Street	St Paul's Church	II	1890	51.4657°N 3.1836°W	Church designed by Cardiff architect John Coates Carter and first opened in 1890. Design includes an unusual use of concrete.
Shelter, Grange Gardens (corner of Corporation Road and Holmsdale Street)	Wooden Shelter	II		51.4675°N 3.1815°W	
War Memorial, Grange Gardens	Grange Gardens War Memorial	II	1920	51.4667°N 3.1807°W	Sculpted by Henry Charles Fehr.

== See also ==
- Architecture of Cardiff
- Listed buildings in Cardiff

== Sources ==
- Listed Buildings in Grangetown, Cardiff, Wales, BritishListedBuildings.co.uk
