= John Coates Carter =

English architect (1859–1927)

- Born: 1859; Norwich
- Died: 1927 (aged 67–68)
- Occupation: Architect
- Practice: Cardiff
- Buildings: Caldey Abbey; St Paul's Church, Grangetown

John Coates Carter (1859–1927) was an English architect. Born in Norwich, Carter is notable for his design and restoration to churches in South Wales, and in particular Glamorgan. He was partnered with John Pollard Seddon from 1884 to 1904 and after he maintained a style steeped in the traditions of the Arts and Crafts Movement to create impressive buildings such as Caldey Abbey and St Luke's Church in Abercarn.

== Biography ==
John Coates Carter was born and raised in Norwich and articled to the local architect John Bond Pearce, who was notable for designing Great Yarmouth Town Hall. Carter later became a pupil of, and then assistant to, London-based architect John Pollard Seddon. Seddon had previously been in partnership with John Prichard between 1852 and 1863 and the two had made an impact in bringing a Neo-Gothic style to many churches in Wales, including a major restoration project to Llandaff Cathedral.

In 1884 Carter and Seddon became partners and in 1889, after working independently on St Catherine at Melincryddan in Neath, Carter was given an office in Cardiff from where he was responsible for the design of many churches in the area. That year the two men undertook two commissions, All Saints in Penarth and St Paul in Grangetown. Both buildings were modelled on George Frederick Bodley's St Augustine's Church, Pendlebury; tall and elegant with unbroken internal spaces. Although All Saints no longer exists in its original form, St Paul is described in Newman's The Buildings of Wales: Glamorgan as "...the finest late Victorian church in the county after Bodley's at Roath." Other churches in Glamorgan by Seddon & Carter, at New Tredegar and Adamsdown are conversely described as being "cheap and simple" with little to reveal the architects' true abilities. Carter was also noted for his work on reredos in several churches, including at St Mary in Bridgend (1921), the Church of the Ascension in North End, Portsmouth (1921) and St Andrew and St Teilo (1924) in Cathays.

In 1904 Carter split from Seddon and began working on his own account. Notable designs as a sole designer include the expressionist All Saints' parish hall in Penarth (1906), a Rhenish-style monastery on Caldey Island (1907–13) and St Luke's, a striking stone and concrete church at Abercarn (1923); now redundant, St Luke's is described as "one of the most strikingly original churches built in Britain between the World Wars." In 1916 he closed his Cardiff office and retired to Prestbury, Gloucestershire, becoming church warden at St Mary's, the local church where he is memorialised. After the end of the First World War, Carter began designing buildings again. It was during this period that Carter, a recognised exponent of the Arts and Crafts movement, began looking to the past to design churches that ignored modernity and produced a handful of churches that used local materials and identifiable Welsh vernacular motifs.

== Style ==
Carter began his career from a Gothic base which gradually changed throughout his career when he embraced the Arts and Crafts movement, through to a style of his own. His early religious buildings were a mixture of his own creative language, the vernacular architecture of the region and the high Anglicanism favoured by his clients. During his early period, Carter was highly influenced by both Seddon and Bodley, from whom he inherited a form of 'modern Gothic. During his partnership with Seddon, Carter began to be influenced by William Morris and the Arts and Crafts movement. This can be seen in his 1902 'Red House' (influenced by Morris' own Red House) in Penarth where Carter lived for sometime. Garnhill House in St Andrew's Major was another prominent work of his. Carter was further influenced by the contemporary developments in mainland Europe and the United States, producing a style characterised as "a kind of Arts & Crafts expressionism".

Towards the end of his career, Carter looked to the past to create buildings fitting to the landscape. His swansong, St Teloi in Llandeloy, is an evocation of a small medieval Welsh church. Rejecting his earlier Gothic leanings, Carter created a church in the Arts and Crafts style with a slate roof, walls of roughly pointed local stone and small windows.

== Works ==
Name	Location	Image	Date	Notes	Grade
St Paul	Paget Street, Grangetown, Cardiff; 51.466310°N 3.185080°W		1888–1891	Designed in 1888 by Seddon & Carter, the church was built largely at the expense of Lord Windsor. Building materials are "highly eccentric" including sandstone and concrete.	II
Paget Rooms	Victoria Road, Penarth; 51.435061°N 3.177219°W		1906	The Paget has roughcast render over a brownglazed brick plinth. Rounded arches over the windows and decorative cartouches are features of the façade.	
Caldey Abbey	Caldey Island, Pembrokeshire; 51.636960°N 4.686351°W		1910	Caldey Abbey was built in 1910 by Anglican Benedictine monks who came to the Island in 1906. The monastery is designed in traditional Italianate style.	II*
Pembroke Dock	War Memorial, Churchyard of St John the Evangelist, Pembroke Dock		1921	Red sandstone calvary on a stone pedestal and a stepped limestone plinth	II
St Luke	Abercarn, Caerphilly; 51.6486°N 3.1327°W		1924–1926	The church was built between 1924 and 1926 but after problems with the roof the building was abandoned. It is now ruinous and under the care of Cadw.	II*
St Mary, Nolton	Bridgend		1924	Installed a reredos as First World War memorial	II
St Teilo	Llandeloy, Pembrokeshire; 51.8975°N 5.1162°W	A simple stone church with a slate roof, a bellcote on the nearest gable and a transept on the right	1926	The church was built from medieval ruins while its interior is dominated by a carved rood screen and a painted reredos. Carter refused to take payment for this work.	II

== Bibliography ==
- Newman, John (1995). The Buildings of Wales: Glamorgan. London: Penguin Group. ISBN 0-14-071056-6.
- O'Brien, Charles; Bailey, Bruce; Pevsner, Nikolaus; Lloyd, David W. (2018). Hampshire: South. The Buildings of England. London: Yale University Press. ISBN 978-0-300-22503-7.
