= Cardiff Rivers Group =

Cardiff environmental charity

- Grŵp afonydd Caerdydd
- Abbreviation: CRG
- Formation: 2009
- Registration no.: 1191857
- Legal status: Charitable incorporated organisation
- Purpose: Clean up and improve water courses. Recycling and habitat management across the city.
- Location: Cardiff
- Region served: Wales
- Award: Queen's Award for Voluntary Service
- Website: cardiffriversgroup.org.uk

Cardiff Rivers Group (CRG) is a volunteer-run environmental charity which holds events across Cardiff and South Wales at which volunteers clean up and improve watercourses: rivers, streams, ponds or the sea. This could be a general litter pick of areas surrounding a watercourse, clearance of debris from a river or pond or removal of fly-tipping. The group also undertakes habitat management across the city in conjunction with Cardiff Council urban park rangers.

== Background ==
The Group was founded in 2009 by Dave King MBE and other like-minded volunteers from Keep Wales Tidy. Events take place across Cardiff typically every couple of week ranging from cleaning the banks of the Rhymney River or Cardiff Bay to making a hedge in Grangemoor Park or trying to eradicate the invasive Himalayan Balsam. Volunteers do not need to register, just turn up to an event as and when they wish. The group can expect up to 70 volunteers for any given event.

CRG emphasises the social aspect of the litter picks as well as the environmental benefits. Their website states "Most importantly, our volunteers have fun!". In an interview with Cardiff council on receiving his MBE, founder Dave King said "The Rivers Group is more than just a litter picking thing. You can get out, make friends, you're really making a difference. We've helped people prepare to get jobs, we're a social circle, and we're a network." In 2024, Wales Online featured some of the more unusual discarded items that the group have found.

In addition to grant funding, much of what is found, especially scrap metal and nitrous oxide canisters, is recycled to fund the charity.

In 2015 The group were partners in Cardiff Council's Environmental scrutiny committee producing the "Restore Our Rivers" report. This listed some of the group's successes and stated the group had 350 volunteers.

In 2020 CRG registered as a Charitable incorporated organisation.

Cardiff Rivers Group partnered with Nextbike while they were active in Cardiff, receiving scrap in return for reuniting abandoned bikes with the company.

== Awards ==
In the Tidy Wales awards for 2012, run by Keep Wales Tidy, the group were winners in the River Improvement category and the overall Tidy Wales winner. In the same awards in 2026, CRG won the Community Group Resilience Award and also the Outstanding Achievement Award, recognising its long-term contribution to volunteer development, environmental action and support for local charities.

In 2015, CRG was awarded the Queen's Award for Voluntary Service, the highest award that can be made to a voluntary group, for "Helping communities take responsibility for the cleanliness of their local watercourses".

In 2023, CRG was shortlisted for the Welsh Charity Awards, run by WCVA, and a runner-up in the income generation category

A Guinness World Record for the most participants in a river clean-up at multiple locations was broken in March 2025 on the river Taff, Cardiff Rivers Group were one of the groups taking part in contributing to the 1327 participants.
