= John Pugsley (footballer) =

Welsh footballer

Personal information
- Full name: John Pugsley
- Date of birth: 1 April 1900
- Place of birth: Grangetown, Cardiff, Wales
- Date of death: 1976 (aged 75–76)
- Height: 5 ft 8 in (1.73 m)
- Position: Wing half

Senior career*
Years	Team	Apps	(Gls)
- Grangetown YMCA
1922	Cardiff City	0	(0)
1925–1926	Grimsby Town	80	(6)
1927	Bristol City	16	(0)
1928–1933	Charlton Athletic	214	(8)
–	Lovells Athletic		
Total		310	(14)

International career
1930	Wales	1	(0)
- * Club domestic league appearances and goals

John Pugsley (born 1 April 1900) was a Welsh footballer who played in the English Football League for Grimsby Town, Bristol City and Charlton Athletic.
