= St Teilo's Church, Llandeloy =

Coordinates: 51.8975°N 5.1162°W

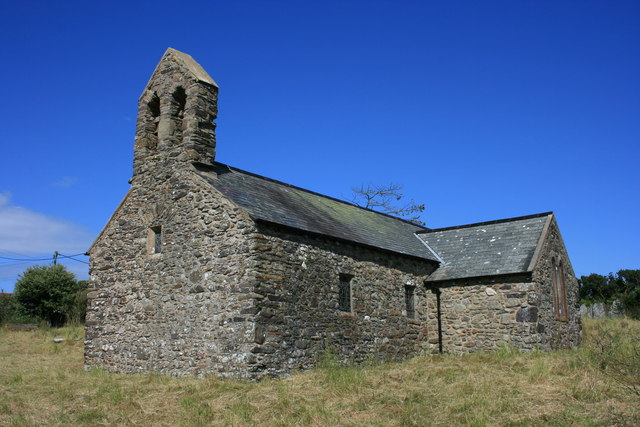
- St Teilo's Church, Llandeloy, from the southwest

- Location in Pembrokeshire
- OS grid reference: SM 856 266
- Location: Llandeloy, Pembrokeshire
- Country: Wales
- Denomination: Church in Wales
- Website: Friends of Friendless Churches

History
- Dedication: Saint Teilo

Architecture
- Functional status: Redundant
- Heritage designation: Grade II
- Designated: 1 March 1963
- Architect: John Coates Carter
- Architectural type: Church
- Style: Arts and Crafts
- Groundbreaking: 1926
- Completed: 1927
- Closed: 2002

Specifications
- Materials: Stone, slate roof

St Teilo's Church, Llandeloy, is a redundant church in the village of Llandeloy, Pembrokeshire, Wales, dedicated to Saint Teilo. It has been designated by Cadw as a Grade II listed building, and is under the care of the Friends of Friendless Churches.

== History ==
The church probably originated in the 12th century, and later served as the village school. However, by the 1840s it was a ruin. It was rebuilt in 1926–27 from the ruins, and was designed by the architect John Coates Carter. The design followed Arts and Crafts principles, that is, to use the simplest available local materials, without attempting to copy the style of any particular period. After the church was closed in 2002, it was taken into the care of the Friends of Friendless Churches.

== Architecture ==
=== Exterior ===
St Teilo's is constructed in stone rubble with a slate roof. It has a "humble exterior". At the west end is a double-arched gabled bellcote. Its plan consists of a nave and a chancel, with a south transept. The chancel inclines slightly to the right. The west window is "tiny". In the north wall of the nave is an arched doorway and a long window, and in the south wall are two square-headed windows. At the east end is a single pointed window. In the north wall of the chancel is a long narrow window and the south wall has two square-headed windows. In the transept are two long lancet windows on the south wall. All the windows have rough (not ashlar) jambs.

=== Interior ===
The interior is "beautiful and evocative". It is long and low, with exposed stone walls. The rood screen with its loft dominates the interior. The loft has a carving of the Crucifixion on its front. In the angle between the rood screen and the north wall is a simple three-sided pulpit. The loft is reached by a stairway in the north wall. In the nave, the pews are simple, with open backs. There are two stone fonts. One is built from ancient stones found during the excavation carried out before the church was rebuilt. The other is octagonal, standing on three steps. The reredos consists of a rectangular wooden panel painted in gesso and coloured with tempera. Its frame is elaborately carved. Also in the church are a stoup, and a pair of piscinas carved from slate. The stained glass in the east window and in the transept date from about 1926, and that in the nave south windows from about 1936.
