= Cardiff Bay Retail Park =

Retail park in Cardiff, Wales

Coordinates: 51.459°N 3.187°W

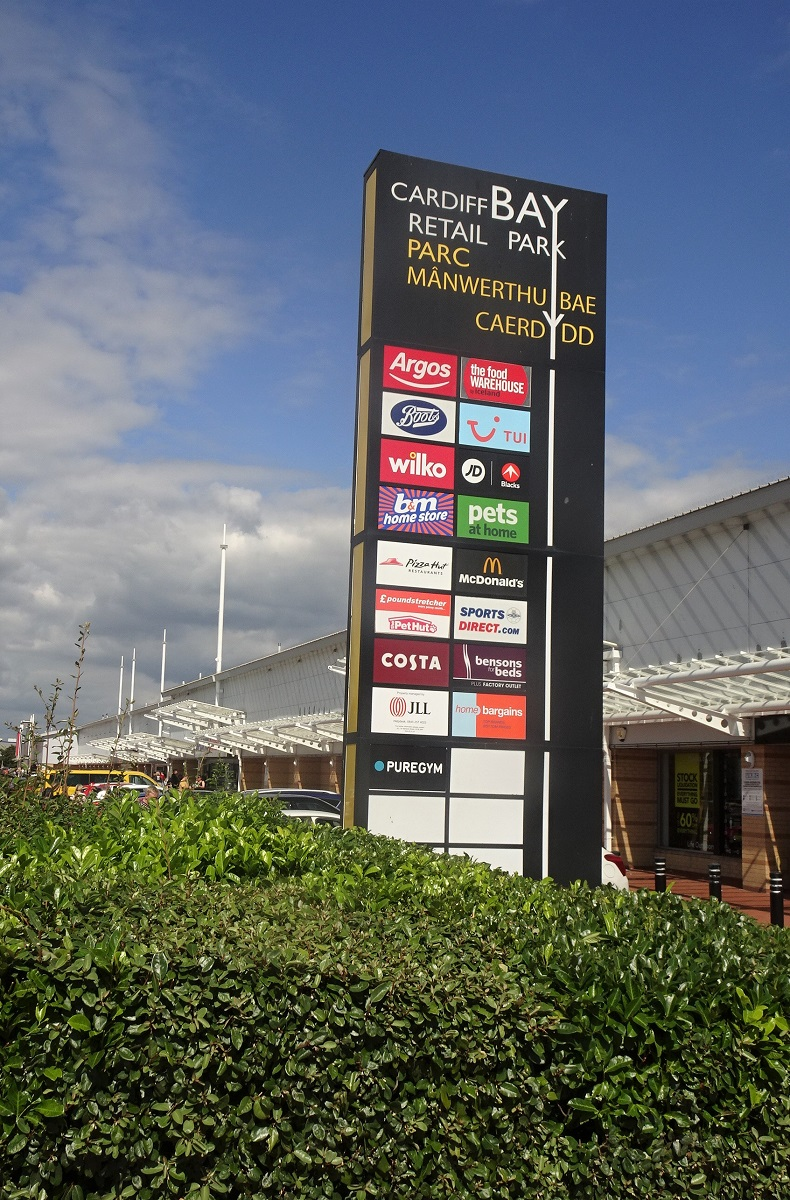
Cardiff Bay Retail Park sign

Cardiff Bay Retail Park (Welsh: Parc Manwerthu Bae Caerdydd) is a retail park in Grangetown, Cardiff. Built in 1997 on the former Ferry Road landfill site. It is currently home to businesses including; Pets at Home, Boots and Sports Direct.

== Development ==
The retail park is built on the edge of a former Ferry Road refuse site, which closed in 1994 after being filled with 4 million cubic metres of commercial and domestic rubbish. The ownership of the land passed to Cardiff Bay Development Corporation who created the retail park on an area of industrial units to the east of the site. Grangemoor Park was created opposite the retail park on the 20 metre hill landscaped on the old refuse site.

== Units ==
=== Phase One ===
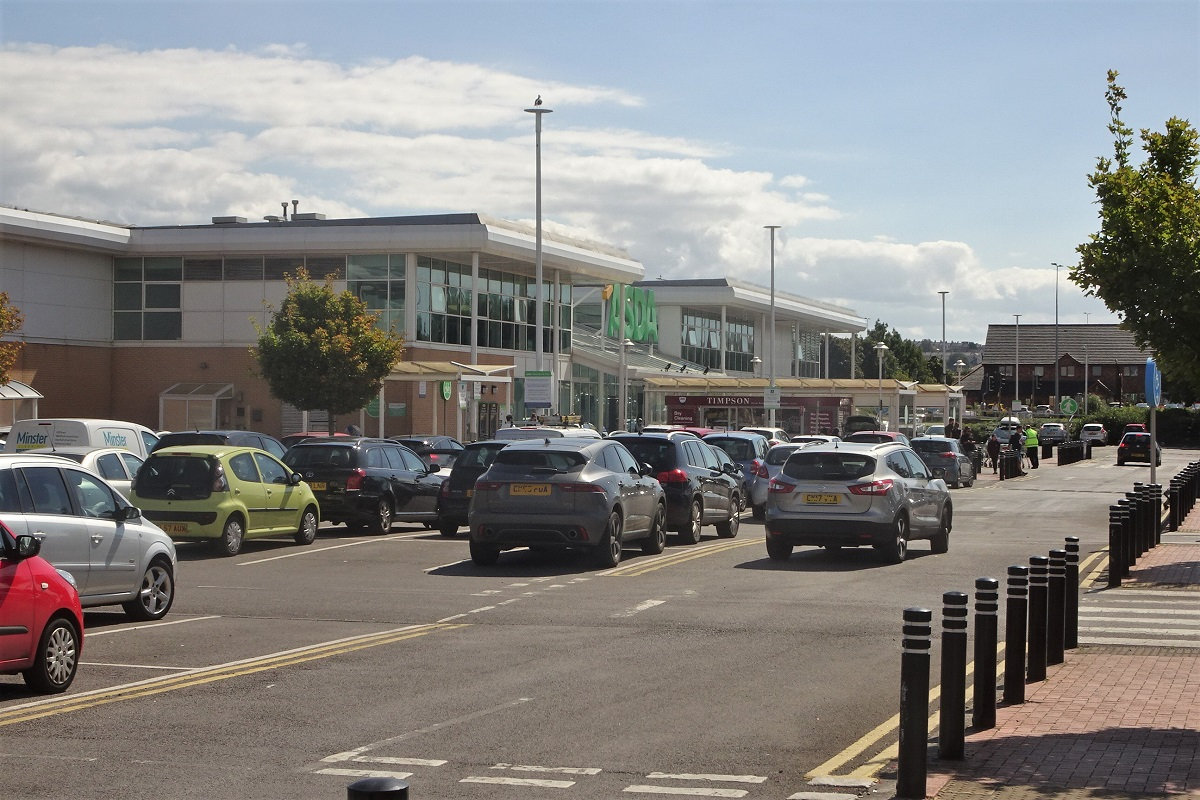
Asda superstore in August 2020

Unit(s)	Current business	Current status	Previous business	Year closed
0	Asda	Open	—N/a	—N/a
A1	British Heart Foundation	Open	Wilko	2023
A2 i	JD Sports	Open	Maples	2000
A2 ii	Blacks	Open	BANK	2015
B	Sports Direct	Open	JJB Sports	2009
C	Pets at Home	Open	—N/a	—N/a
D	Boots	Open	—N/a	—N/a
E	—N/a	—N/a	Argos	2023
F	—N/a	—N/a	Argos	2023
G	The Food Warehouse	Open	British Home Stores	2016
H	Home Bargains	Open	British Home Stores	2016
I (Ex2)	McDonald's	Open	—N/a	—N/a
Pod	Costa Coffee	Open	—N/a	—N/a

Maples was a homeware store that closed in around 2000. Over the years, the unit has been split into 3 smaller units.

Furnitureland and Powerhouse both closed their units in 2007. BHS then refurbished both to create one large unit until they ceased trading in 2016.

JJB closed their unit here once they moved to the Capital Retail Park in Leckwith, which also included a gym.

=== Phase Two ===
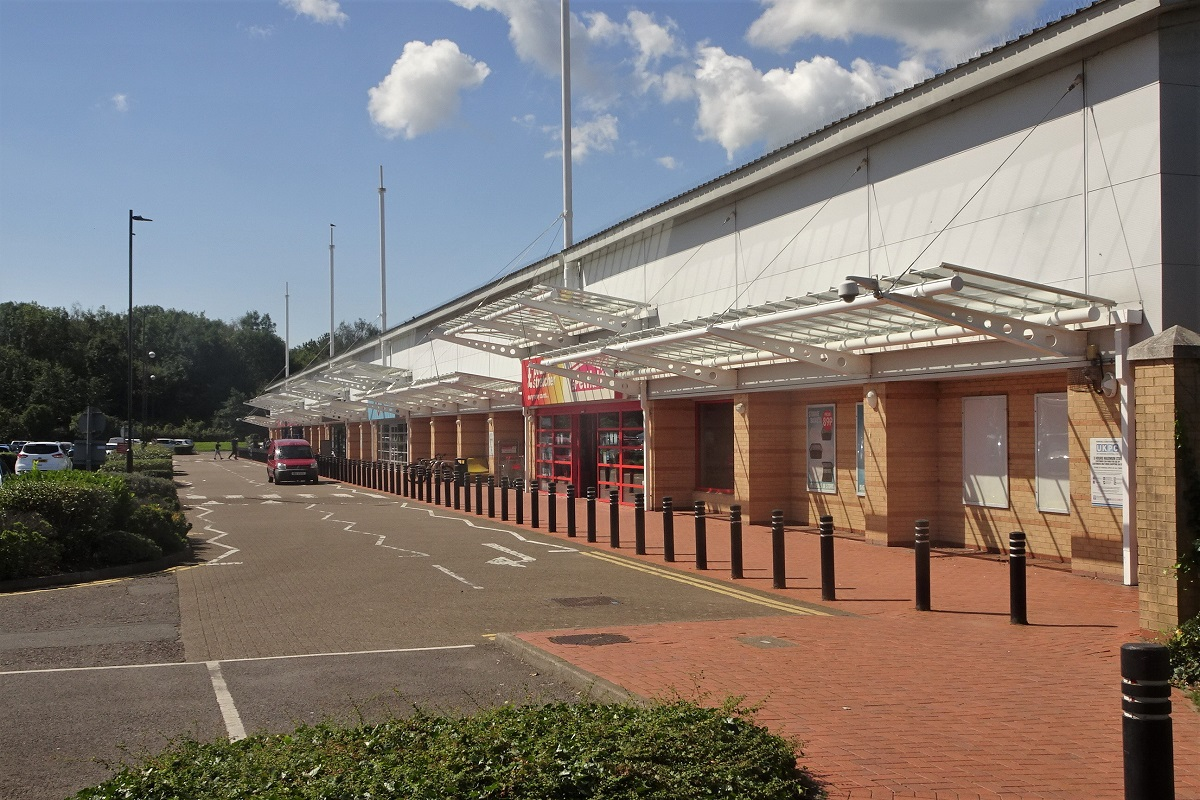
Phase 2 units, Poundstretcher in the foreground

Unit(s)	Current business	Current status	Previous business	Year closed
J	Lidl	Open	Poundstretcher	2021
K	TUI Holiday Hypermarket	Open	Staples	2011
L	Pure Gym	Open	Bensons for Beds	2019
M	B&M Home Store	Open	Kingsway Furniture	2004
N	B&M Home Store	Open	Tiles R Us	2004
O	Popeyes	Open (2023)	Pizza Hut	2022

=== Phase Three (Dunleavy Drive) ===
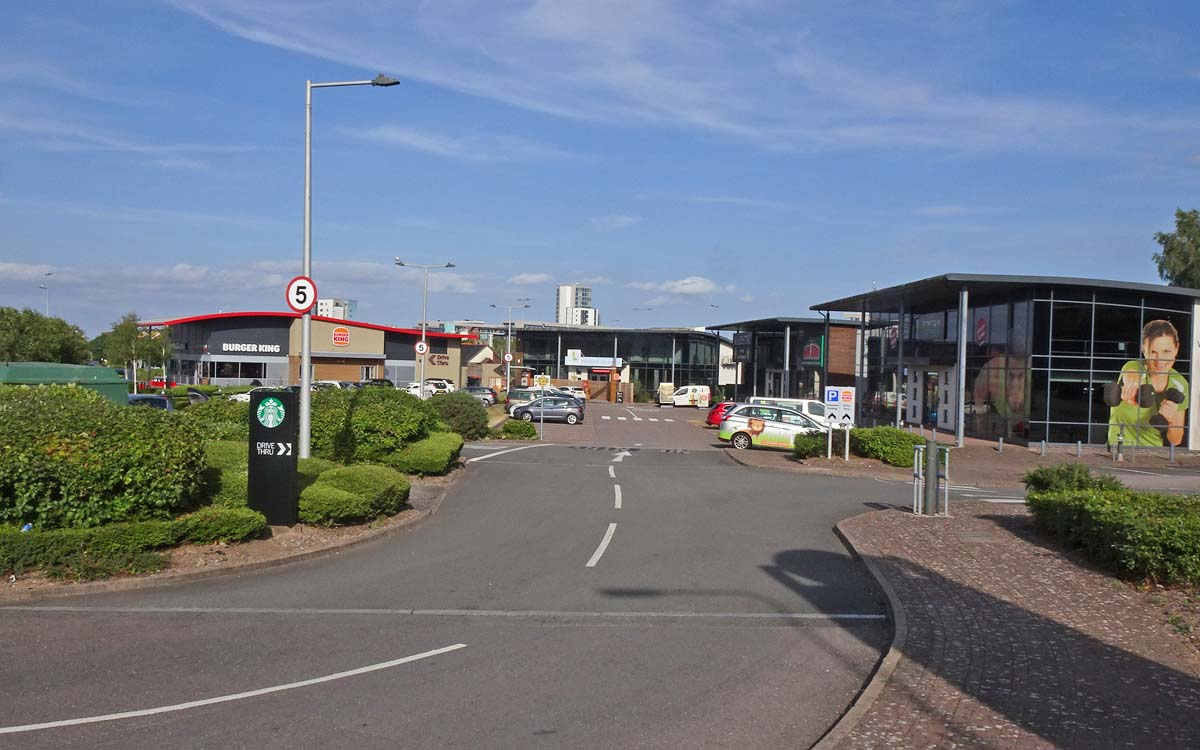
Dunleavy Drive in July 2023

The Dunleavy Drive section of the Cardiff Bay Retail Park was built in 2008.

Unit(s)	Current business	Current status
1	Burger King	Open
2	Green Giraffe Organic Day Nursery	Open
3	Majestic Wine Warehouse	Open
3	Papa John's	Closed
4	fit4less	Closed
5	Starbucks Coffee	Open
Drive-thru	Starbucks Coffee	Open
H	Harvester – The Cardiff Bay	Open

== Other nearby outlets ==
Other stores in the surrounding area include Aldi and the Cedar Tree Carvery immediately to the south (part of the Cardiff International Sports Village) and IKEA to the north.
