= Grangetown, Cardiff =

District and community in Cardiff, Wales

Coordinates: 51°28′03″N 3°11′07″W

Grangetown
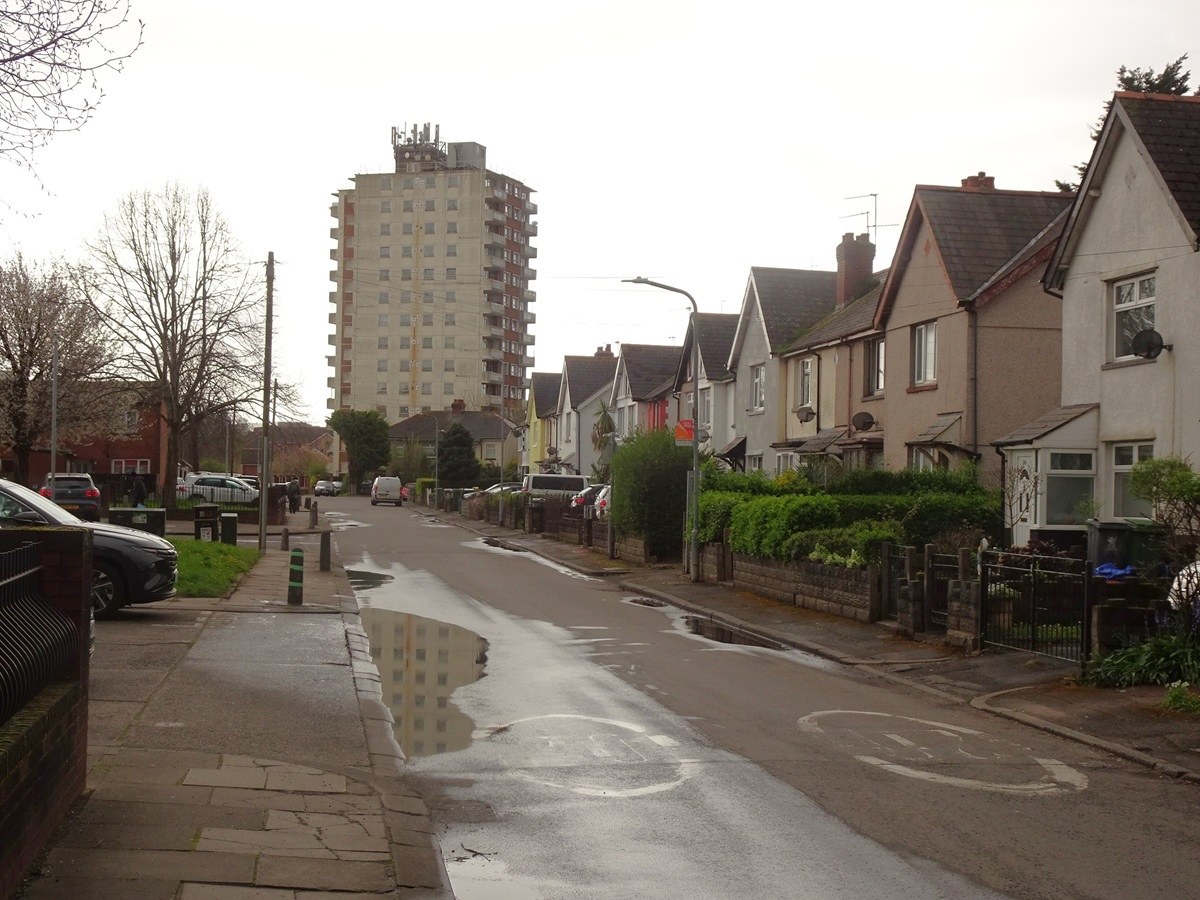
- Channel View Road, Grangetown
- Population: 19,385 (2011)
- OS grid reference: ST1774
- Community: Grangetown
- Principal area: Cardiff
- Preserved county: Cardiff
- Country: Wales
- Sovereign state: United Kingdom
- Post town: CARDIFF
- Postcode district: CF11
- Dialling code: 029
- Police: South Wales
- Fire: South Wales
- Ambulance: Welsh
- UK Parliament: Cardiff South & Penarth
- Senedd Cymru – Welsh Parliament: Caerdydd Penarth
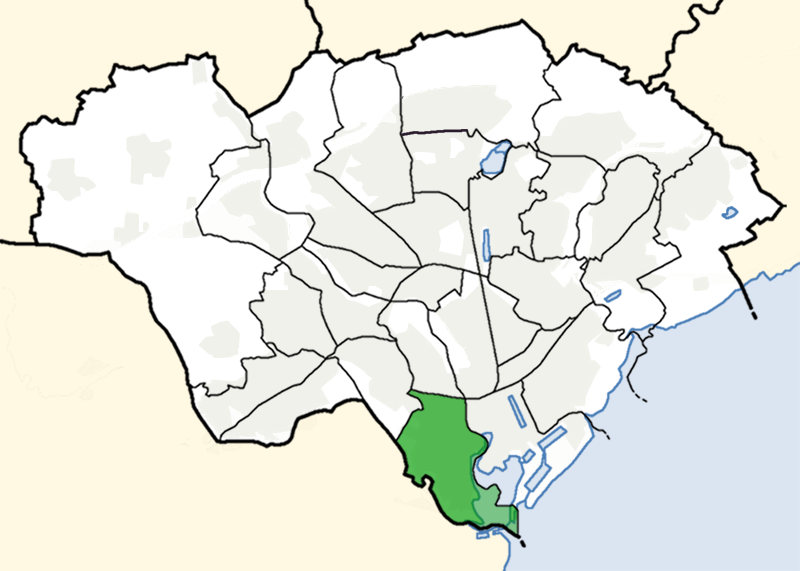
- List of places UK Wales Cardiff

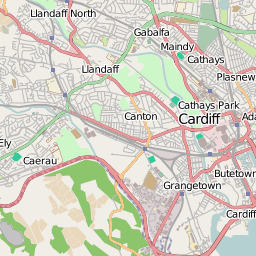

Grangetown (Welsh: usually Grangetown, also Trelluest) is a district and community in the south of Cardiff, capital of Wales. It is one of the largest districts in the south of the city and is bordered by Riverside, Canton and Butetown. The River Taff winds its way along its eastern border. Adjacent to the city's Cardiff Bay area, Grangetown is experiencing a period of gentrification and improvements in its infrastructure. Its population as of 2011 was 19,385 in 8,261 households. One of the "five towns of Cardiff", the others are Butetown, Crockherbtown, Newtown and Temperance Town.

Grangetown is a diverse and multiracial district and has a significant population of Somali, Asian and mixed-race residents. It is home to a Swaminarayan Temple and various mosques.

== Etymology ==
The name Grangetown is the usual form in Welsh. The variants Y Grange (dating back to the nineteenth century) and Y Grênj (equivalents of The Grange) are sometimes seen. Owen John Thomas has used the form Y Grange Mawr (literally, 'the great grange', though perhaps influenced by the English Grange Moor). The name Trelluest (Welsh tre 'town' + lluest 'lodge') was coined by the historian John Davies, with Trefaenor (tre + maenor 'manor') and Trefynach (tre + mynach 'monk') also appearing to be recent coinages.

Gwyddoniadur Cymru, the Welsh-language version of the Encyclopaedia of Wales, uses Grangetown, but notes the existence of Trelluest. Trelluest, though increasingly popular, is a 21st-century invention by Grangetown resident, Dr John Davies.

The grange was named after the 'moor' or saltmarsh upon which it stood, giving rise to English forms such as 'More Grange' and 'Grangemoor' and French equivalents such as 'La Grange de Mora'.

== History ==
Until the mid-19th-century Grangetown was an area of marshy land used for farming. It appears to have been granted to the Cistercian abbey of Margam Abbey sometime at the end of the twelfth century. The monks established a monastic grange there which they held until they were expelled in around 1290 by Gilbert de Clare, Lord of Glamorgan. Their lands were restored to them in 1329 and they held them until the dissolution of the monasteries.

By the fifteenth century the grange was being farmed to laymen. The last farmer was a landowner called Lewis ap Richard who is also known as a patron of the Welsh-language poet Rhys Brychan. After the dissolution, the grange remained in the hands of Lewis's descendants. Lewis's son, Edward Lewis, also a noted patron of Welsh poets, settled at the Van near Caerphilly. The grange remained in the hands of the Lewises of the Van when they moved to St Fagans Castle during the 1610s. The Lewis estates eventually passed through an heiress into the hands of Other Lewis Windsor (1731–1771), 4th Earl of Plymouth. The grange was farmed by a succession of tenants into the twentieth century.

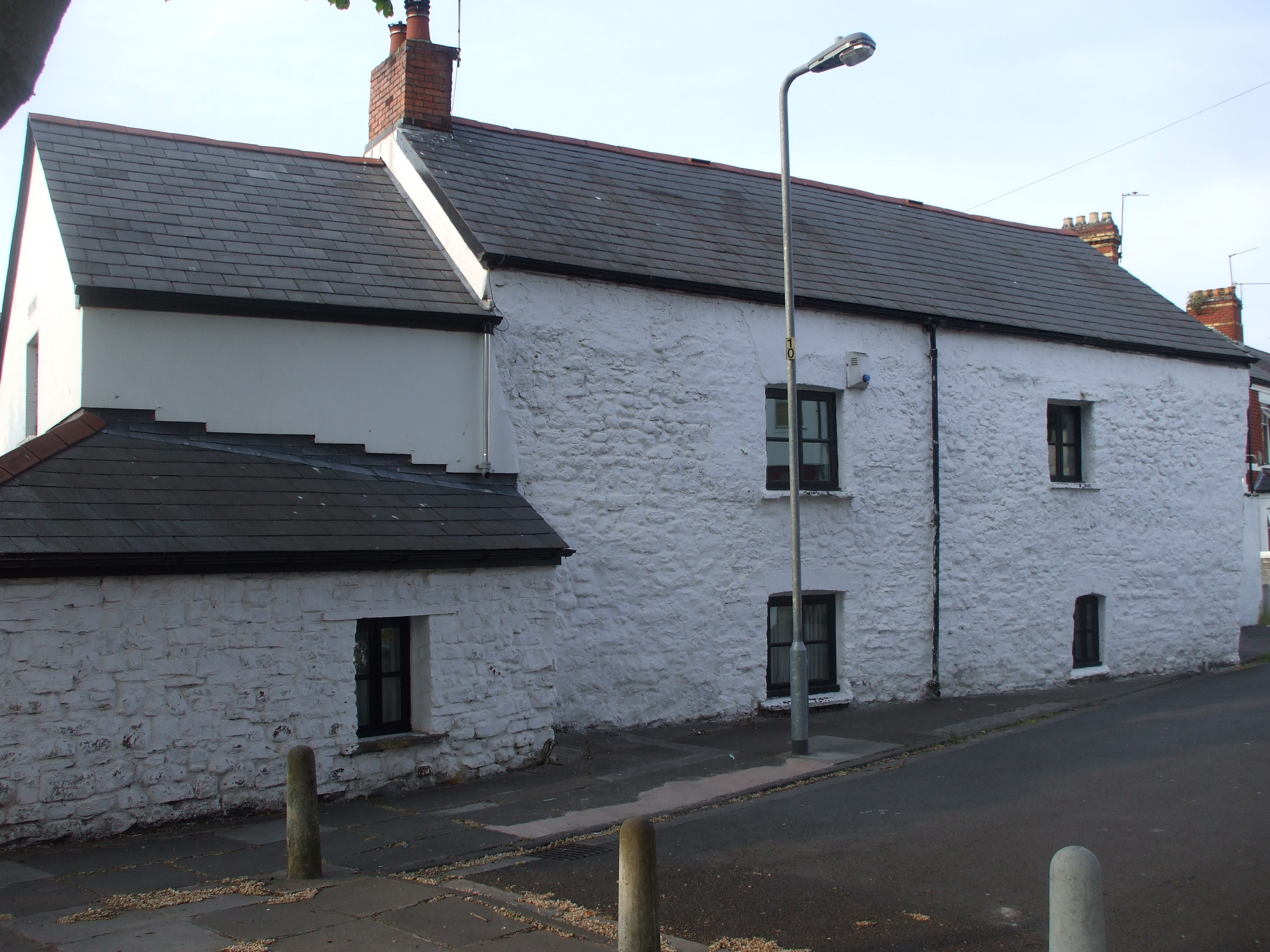
Grange Farm

The farmhouse, known as Grange Farm, still exists today but is now surrounded by streets of terraced brick houses, which were built to house the many workers who moved to Cardiff to work in the industrial boom of the 19th century, particularly centred on the docks. The farmhouse dates in part from the sixteenth century.

Grangetown developed after 1850, the year Penarth Road and the bridges over the River Taff and River Ely were constructed, linking Cardiff with Penarth. In 1857 Baroness Windsor (whose Plymouth Estate owned the land) obtained an Act of Parliament to build housing in the area, intending to call it The Grange. Grangetown became a suburb of Cardiff in 1875. The area was low lying and subject to flooding. In 1883 the sea flooded parts of Grangetown to a depth of five feet.

Samuel Arthur Brain, the founder of Brains Brewery, was elected to Cardiff Council in 1885 to represent Grangetown.

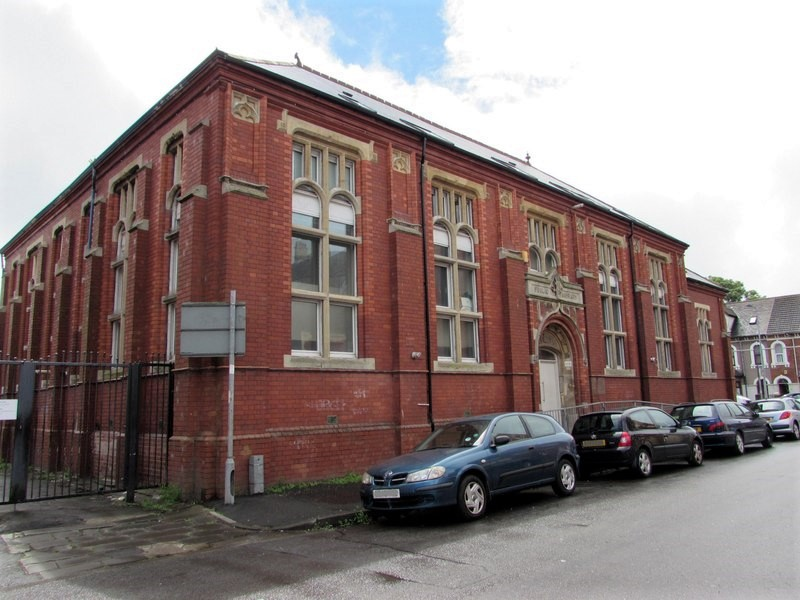
The original Grangetown Library

Grangetown's original public library on Redlaver Street was built in 1900–1901 in the Tudor Gothic style. It has now been sold to developers and converted into flats.

Grangetown was attacked in the Cardiff Blitz. On 2 January 1941, during the full moon, around 100 German planes raided Cardiff for over 10 hours. A cellar at Hollyman Brothers Bakery on the corner of Corporation Road and Stockland Street was being used as a bunker. All 32 people in the shelter, including members of the Hollyman family, were killed. The premises continued as a bakery for about a decade, then became Clarence Hardware shop, which remains to this day. On the side of the building is a plaque in memory of the victims, erected by the Grangetown Local History Society.

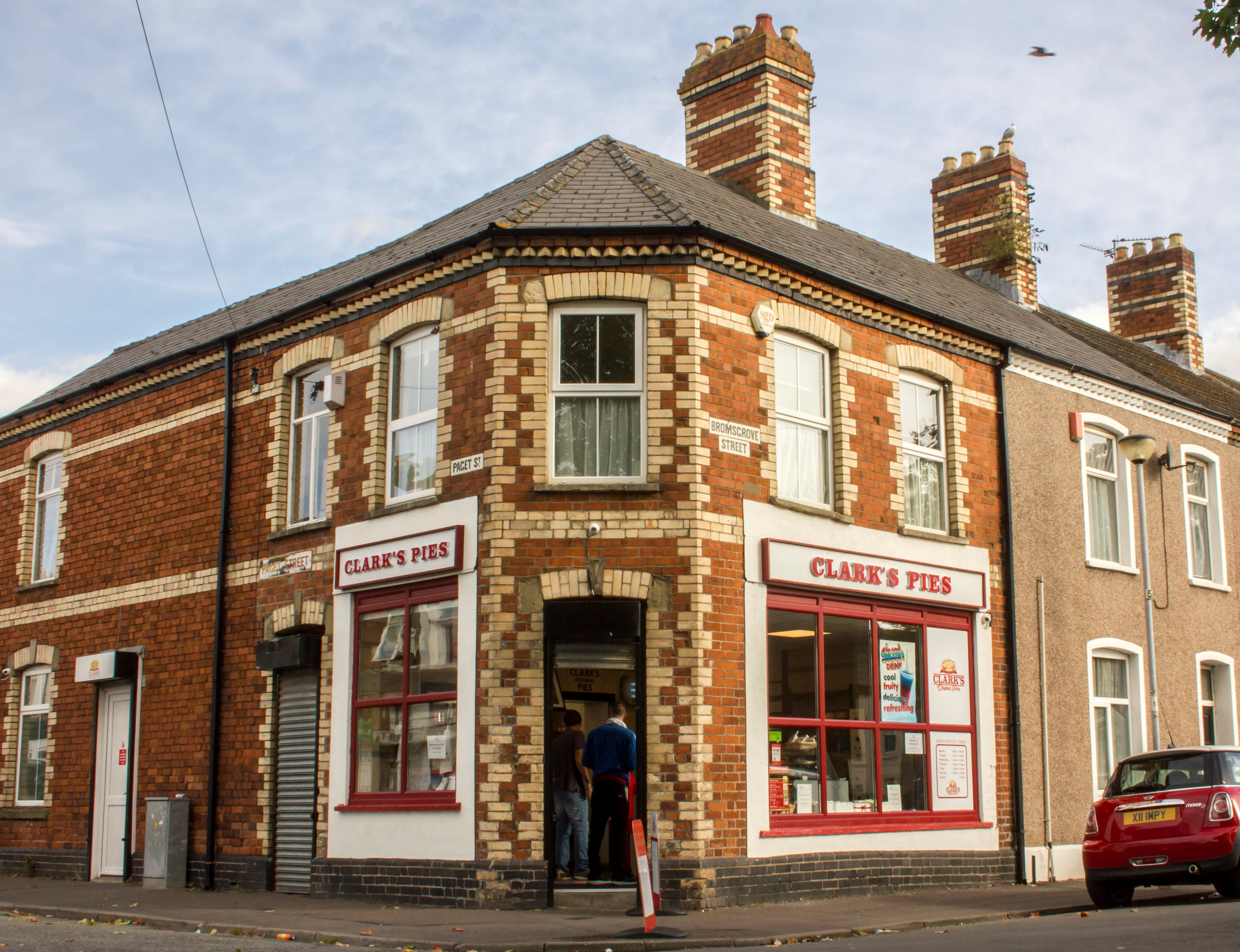
Clark's Pies shop in Bromsgrove Street

Cardiff's popular pastries, Clark's Pies, arrived in Grangetown in 1955 when Dennis Dutch (great-grandson of Mary and Arthur Clark) opened a shop in Bromsgrove Street. The shop still trades today.

== Government ==
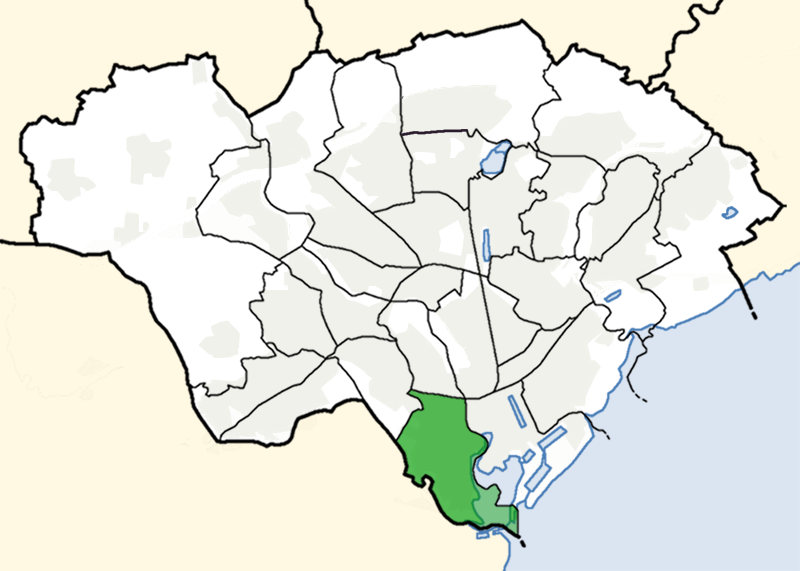
Grangetown electoral ward of Cardiff

The community of Grangetown does not have a community council for the area. The Grangetown electoral ward returns four local councillors to Cardiff Council. Grangetown is part of the Cardiff South and Penarth constituency which returns one MP to the UK Parliament. Since the 2026 Senedd election it has been part of the Caerdydd Penarth constituency which elects six Members of the Senedd.

== Places of worship ==
Grangetown has at least ten Christian places of worship including Grangetown Baptist Church and the Salvation Army citadel.

The church of St Paul, Paget Street, was built between 1889 and 1902, largely at the expense of Lord Windsor. It uses an "eccentric" palette of materials including pennant rubble, pink sandstone and Portland cement. The architect was John Coates Carter, a distinguished Arts & Crafts designer.

St Patrick's Church is the Roman Catholic place of worship for the neighbourhood.

St Dyfrig and St Samson, Pentre Gardens, dates from 1911.

There is a Hindu temple on Merches Place, a mosque called Masjid Abu Bakr on Clydach Street and a newly built Masjid called Markaz At-Tawheed on Penarth road.

== The Welsh language ==
The number of Grangetown residents over three years old who speak Welsh has grown from 1,217 (8.9%) in the 2001 UK Census to 1,867 (10.2%) in the 2011 UK Census. This equates to over 15% of the total increase in Welsh speakers in Cardiff, despite Grangetown having only 5.6% of Cardiff's population.

Grangetown was the location of the first Welsh-medium primary school class in Cardiff and the former county of Glamorgan. This class opened in 1949 with 8 pupils in what is now Ninian Park Primary School, an event commemorated by a plaque in the school's foyer. A Welsh-medium primary school, Ysgol Tan-yr-eos, was opened on the same site in 2006. This school was closed in 2013 and children in Welsh-medium education will be schooled in either Ysgol Gymraeg Pwll Coch or Ysgol Gymraeg Treganna, both in Canton. Plans for a new Welsh-medium school in Grangetown were withdrawn by Cardiff Council in July 2013.

The first Grangetown Eisteddfod took place at the Grange Gardens Pavilion on 7 June 2026, reflecting the rise in the number of Welsh speakers in the immediate area.

== Amenities ==
=== Tramshed ===
The Tramshed, a music and entertainment venue that opened in October 2015, is housed in a converted tram depot, dating from 1902 and Grade II listed. The venue has a capacity of 1000 people.

=== Library ===
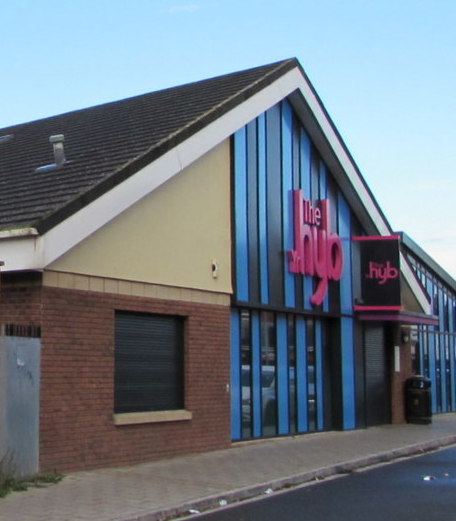
Grangetown Hub

The Grangetown Library opened in 2007 on Havelock Place. This has since been renovated and turned into The Hub (Yr Hyb in Welsh). It essentially provides the same services as the library but also allows residents of the area access to more council services.

=== Leisure centres ===
- The Channel View Leisure Centre is in the south of Grangetown, off Avondale Road. Its facilities include a gym, bookable sports halls, an outdoor astro pitch, an internet cafe and a climbing wall.
- The Cardiff International Sports Village is located in the far south of the area, on the south side of the junction with the A 4232 and features the Cardiff International Pool and Cardiff Arena.

=== Parks and gardens ===
Four public parks are in the district: Grange Gardens, Sevenoaks Park, the Marl and Grangemoor Park. Grangemoor Park was created on top of a rubbish tip and opened in 2000. In February 2018 the second stage of a National Lottery Community Fund bid was successful and the project received £1,072,692 to rebuild Grange Pavilion in Grange Gardens. This work was completed in 2020. Grange Gardens is listed at Grade II on the Cadw/ICOMOS Register of Parks and Gardens of Special Historic Interest in Wales.

=== Public houses and clubs ===
There are two public houses in the district, The Cornwall and The Grange, and a number of licensed social clubs.

=== Shopping ===
The district has three post offices. A reasonable number of small local shops are centred on Penarth Road and Corporation Road. In addition, the Cardiff Bay Retail Park is home to a number of superstores.

=== Education ===
- Grangetown Nursery is a nursery school for children aged around 3. It is located in Avondale Road.
- Grangetown Primary School is an old Victorian school, built in 1884.
- St Patrick's School is a Roman Catholic primary school with around 250 pupils and 13 teachers.
- Ninian Park School has over 400 pupils and 25 teachers. It was built in 1899–1900, at which time it was the most expensive board school in Cardiff.
- St Paul's School is a Church in Wales primary school with over 100 students enrolled

== Festivals and events ==
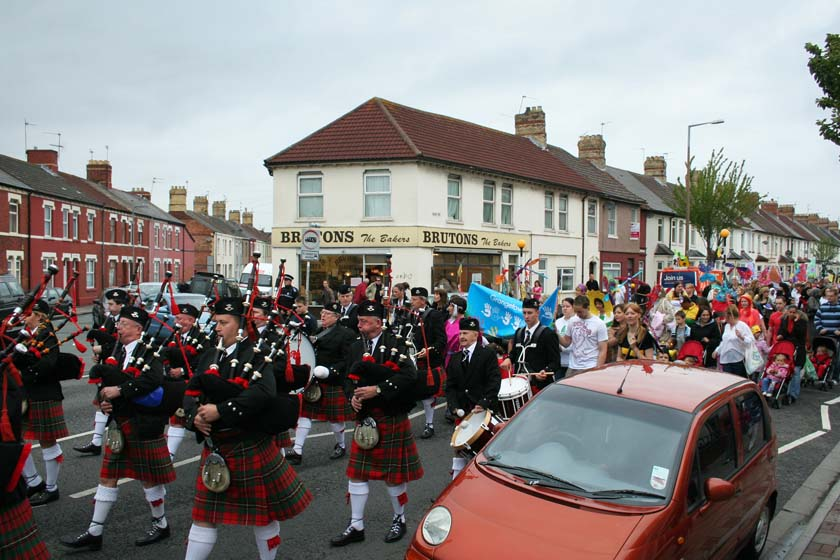
Grangetown Carnival 2008

Grangetown Festival take place for a week in June each year. It began in 1978 and is organised by Grangetown Community Action. The festival culminates in a parade through the streets, ending in Grange Gardens where a carnival takes place.

The 'Roxe Jam' hip-hop and graffiti festival takes place annually in Sevenoaks Park, Grangetown, on the last weekend of July. The first festival was in July 2008. The event was set up in memory of a young graffiti writer, Bill Lockwood aka Roxe, who was killed in a road accident. The main highlight of the event is the legal painting of a 140 m-long (460 ft) wall which runs parallel to the Cardiff to Penarth railway line. The festival last took place in 2012.

== Sport and leisure ==
=== Baseball ===
Grangetown was the home of Grange Albion and Grange Catholics, two of British baseball's most successful teams. Both played their home games at Sevenoaks Park. Grange Albion celebrated its centenary in 2007 but both clubs' teams were discontinued due to lack of players, with the Welsh Baseball League suspended in the summer of 2018 with only three teams left to compete.

=== Cricket ===
Bay Dragons Cricket Club is based in Grangetown and play in the South East Wales Cricket League.

=== Football ===
Grange Albion F.C. play at Coronation Park and are a member of the South Wales Alliance League.

== Notable people ==
- John Davies, historian, lived in Grangetown in the 1960s and later between 2000 and his death in 2015.
- Edgar Phillips, Welsh-language poet and Archdruid of Wales, educated at Ninian Park School
- Elfyn Lewis, award-winning artist, lives in Grangetown.
- John Pugsley Cardiff City FC & Wales national football player, born in Grangetown
- Maureen Rees, British reality TV personality
- Mark Ring – Wales Rugby Union. Grange Albion & Wales Baseball International
- Dai Westacott – Wales Rugby Union International, born in Grangetown
- Frank Whitcombe – Bradford Northern, Wales & Great Britain national rugby league team International.
- George Whitcombe – Grange Albion & Wales Baseball Captain, Cardiff City Footballer.
- Terry Yorath – Cardiff City FC & Wales national football player and Manager
- Peter Wingfield - Actor

== Transport ==
Grangetown railway station is located on the Vale of Glamorgan Line from Cardiff Central to Bridgend via Barry, Rhoose Cardiff International Airport and Llantwit Major, with branch lines serving Penarth and Barry Island.

Cardiff Bus operates the following services in the area:

- 1 City Circle towards Canton
- 2 City Circle towards Cardiff Bay
- 8 (Central Stn-Roath-Heath-University Hospital Wales) or (Cardiff Bay)
- 9/9A (Central Stn-Roath-Heath-University Hospital Wales) or (Cardiff International Sports Village) / (Channel View)
- 92 from Penarth Road (Penarth)
- 93/94 from Penarth Road (Penarth-Barry)

Penarth Road (A4160) is the main road running through the area northeastbound to Cardiff city centre and southwest bound to Llandough, Dinas Powys, Penarth and Barry. The Ferry Road Interchange on the Grangetown Link Road (A4232) links to the M4 J33 (Cardiff West).

== TV and Film ==
The parish church of St Paul, Paget Street, was used as the location for the BBC's Doctor Who series episode Father's Day. In the story, the church is attacked by monsters called 'Reapers' while a wedding is about to commence. Filming took place on location in November 2004.

== Recent changes ==
North Grangetown Renewal Area (2005-2013) saw 500 homes refurbished in a rolling block programme with new roofs, windows and rendering. The £9m project run by Cardiff Council with Welsh Government funding was supposed to cover 858 homes over 10 years but was curtailed due to capital funding cutbacks. There were also delays due to weather and tendering and latter work was scaled back, much to local disappointment. Improvements included planting of trees and the creation of a new public open space, Gerddi Courtmead Gardens, parallel to Hereford Street.

Cardiff University's Community Gateway scheme supports projects in Grangetown. Projects have included a youth forum, a local business/shop local project and the renovation of supporting of an old bowls pavilion at Grange Gardens.

== Location within Cardiff ==
Canton	Riverside	City centre
	Grangetown	Butetown
Leckwith		Cardiff Bay

== See also ==
- Listed buildings in Grangetown, Cardiff
- Cardiff Mail Centre
