= Grangemoor Park =

Park in Cardiff, Wales

Coordinates: 51.456°N 3.19°W

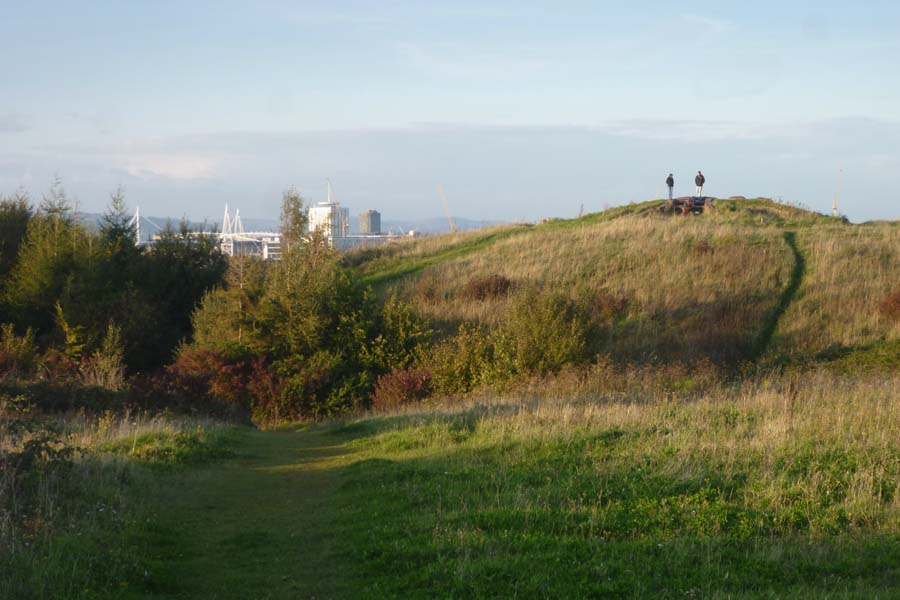
Grangemoor Park hill, with Cardiff's Principality Stadium in the distance

Grangemoor Park is a public park located between the River Ely and Cardiff Bay Retail Park in the Grangetown area of Cardiff, Wales. Prior to development of the park the area was a landfill site for household waste, which closed in 1994. The park now rises 20 metres (66 ft) above the river and surrounding area with panoramic views over the south of the city.

== History and development ==
The area was originally known as Penarth Moors, a marshy area in an extreme meander of the River Ely. In 1971 the River Ely was straightened with a new cut which isolated the old river bed. Cardiff City Council used the old river bed to dump municipal waste. Landfilling of commercial and household waste continued until 1994 by which time the site contained four million cubic metres of rubbish. The 1,100-hectare (4.2 sq mi) site subsequently passed into the hands of Cardiff Bay Development Corporation, who created a new retail park on the old industrial site to the east.

The refuse site was covered, restored and developed to create Grangemoor Park, completed in 2000. The name was chosen following a local competition. The park includes extensive natural grasslands, a pond, artwork and a picnic area.

== Wildlife ==
A variety of butterflies and insects, as well as nesting birds (including skylarks) can be found in the park. Two species of newt live in the pond at the lowest part of the site. 850 slow worms were relocated from nearby Ferry Road to Grangemoor Park in 2006 to allow a housing development to go ahead. The long grasses and small bushes were ideal habitat and the slow worms subsequently settled in the park.

Grangemoor Park is a designated Site of Importance for Nature Conservation (SINC). It is one of the locations in which Cardiff Rivers Group conduct litter-picks and habitat management.

== Artwork ==
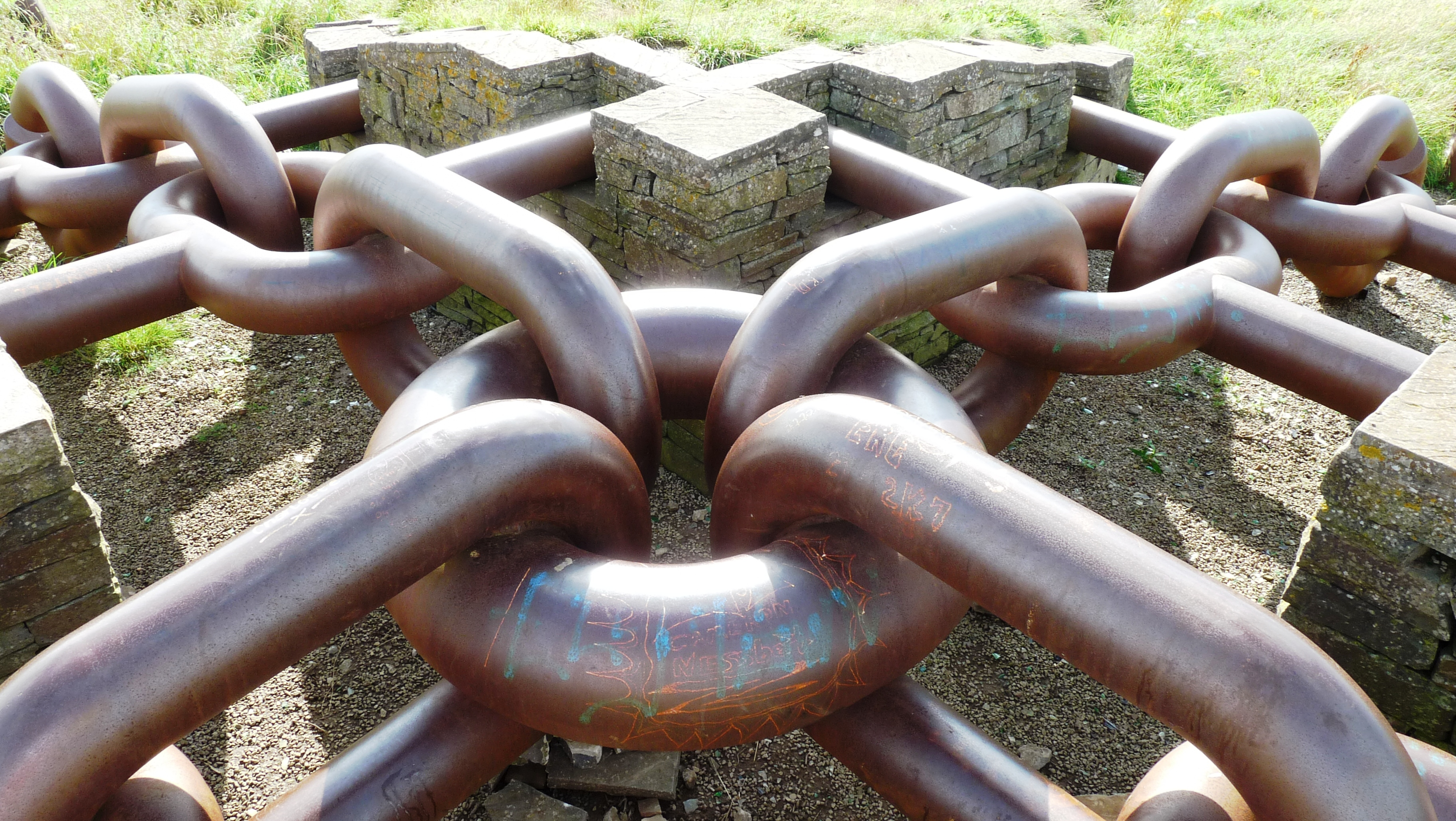
"Silent Links"

A large sculpture consisting of giant steel chain links was created at the highest point of the park in 2000. Called "Silent Links", it was designed by sculptor Ian Randall.

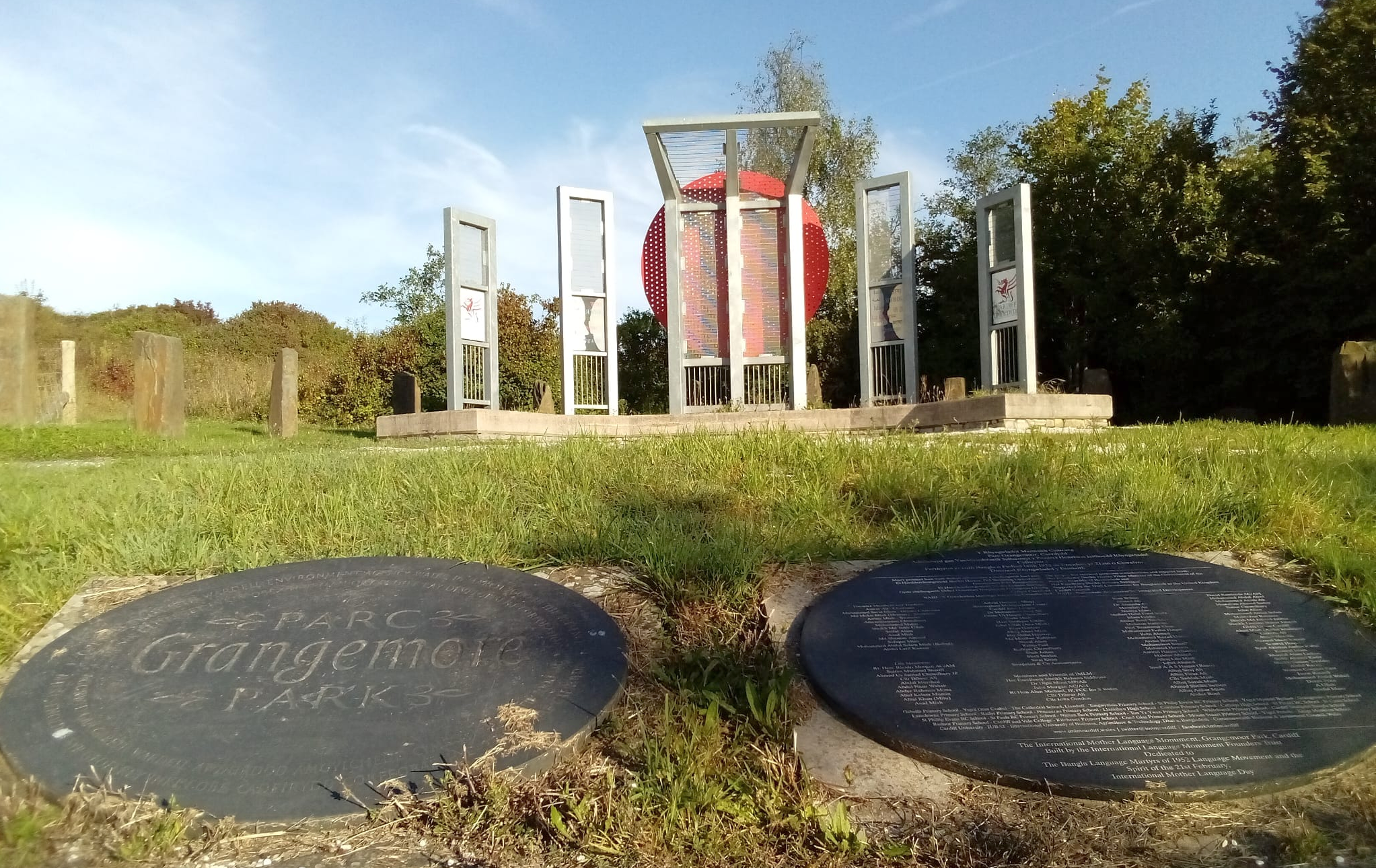
International Language Monument in Grangemoor Park, Cardiff

In 2016, Grangemoor Park was chosen as the location for a new International Language Monument. Work began on its construction in early November 2018, and it was unveiled on International Mother Language Day, 21 February 2019.
