= Clark's Pies =

British meat pie

- Company type: Private
- Founded: 1909
- Founder: Mary Clark
- Headquarters: Bristol, England
- Products: Pies
- Website: www.clarkspies.net

Clark's Pies, also colloquially nicknamed "Clarkies" or "Clarksies," are well-known meat pies that originated in Cardiff, and can now be found in Bristol and the South of Wales.

== History ==
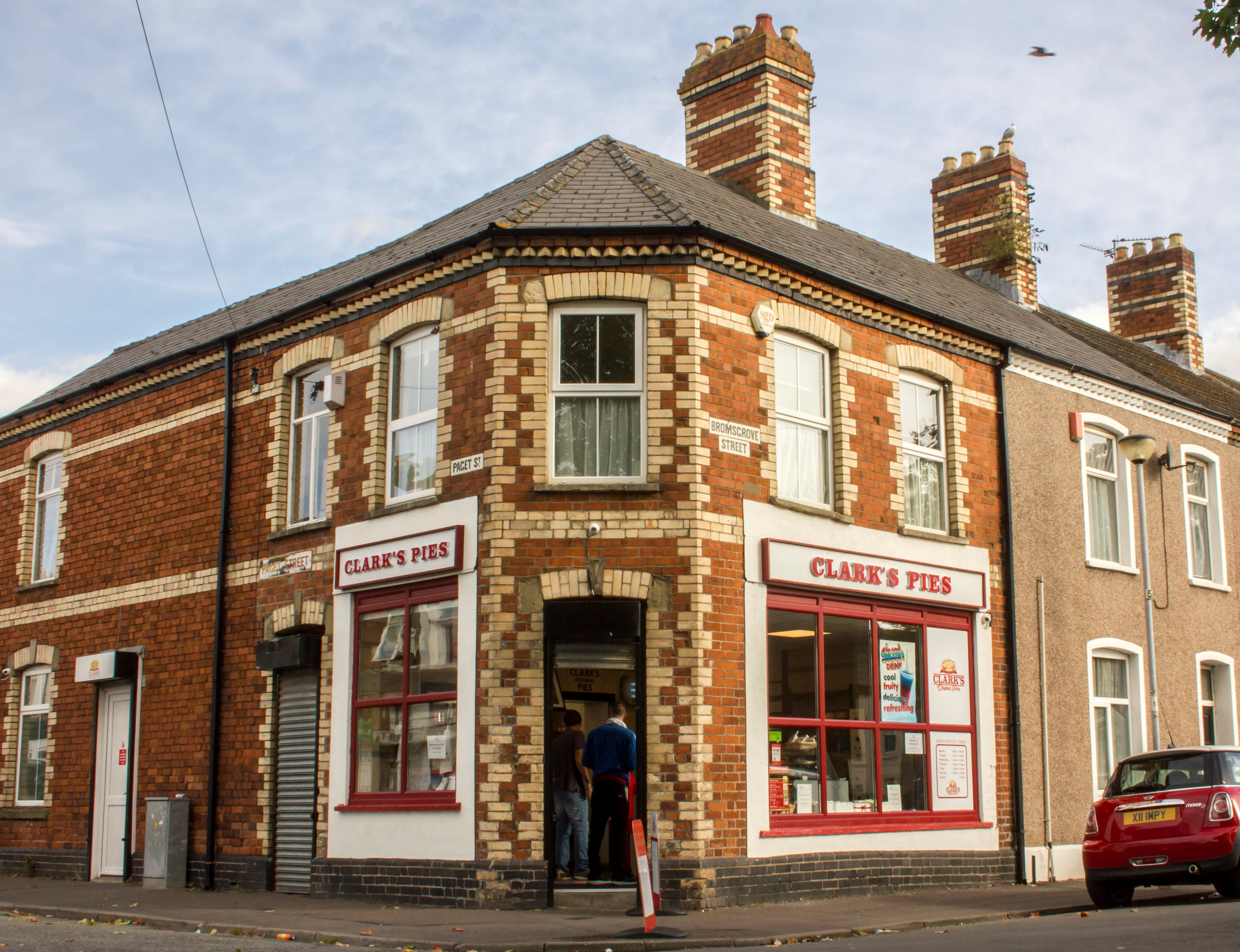
The Clark's Pies shop in Bromsgrove Street

A printed paper bag from the 1930s states that the business was established in 1909. A shop opened on Llanmaes Street in Roath, Cardiff in 1913. Developed by Mary Clark, a second shop opened on Cowbridge Road East in nearby Canton in the 1930s. During World War II the first shop was closed due to wartime meat rationing. Dennis Dutch, Mary Clark's grandson, opened the third pie shop and bakery on 10 May 1955 in Bromsgrove Street, Grangetown. In 2005, Dutch celebrated the shop's 50th anniversary. The family have since sold Clark's Pies in Cardiff to another bakery ending their association with Clark's Pies

In the 1920s, (Harold, Harry) Percy Clark left his mother Mary to branch out on his own, establishing a shop in North Street, Bedminster, Bristol, where he built his own business. The shop passed to Percy's sons, John, Ken and Roger Clark, who have all since retired. Keith Prested now owns Clark's Pies Ltd along with his partner, Roger's daughter, Dawn Clark, who continues in the family tradition as a director of the business, which is still located at 259 North Street, Ashton Gate, Bristol where it has been making pies and pasties continuously since the 1930s.

== Recipe ==
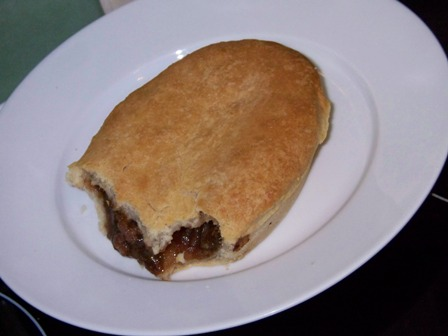
The Clark's Pie

The exact recipe of the pie filling is a closely guarded secret, but includes beef, vegetables and gravy. Unusually for a pie, the pastry is thick enough not to require a foil tray. Each pie has the word "CLARPIE" stamped into the pastry.

== Consuming the pie ==
Knives and forks are not required; the pastry is thick enough to pick up and eat in the upright position without crumbling or getting soggy. Microwaving the pie will negate these qualities, making the pie pastry soft.

A Clark's Tash is the nickname given to burning the upper lip with the hot filling.

== Quotations ==
- Frank Hennessy: I can't remember not having a Clark's Pie. As soon as Cardiffians saw the Millennium Stadium they fell in love with it. They didn't realise why. It's like a giant Clark's pie with four cocktail sticks in it.
- Ian Holloway, former Bristol Rovers player/manager, erroneously claims the pie to be a Bristol invention: There's some great things that have come out of Bristol – Clark's pies, a couple of football teams... not sure about me, though!
