= Cardiff Mail Centre =

Royal Mail sorting office in Wales

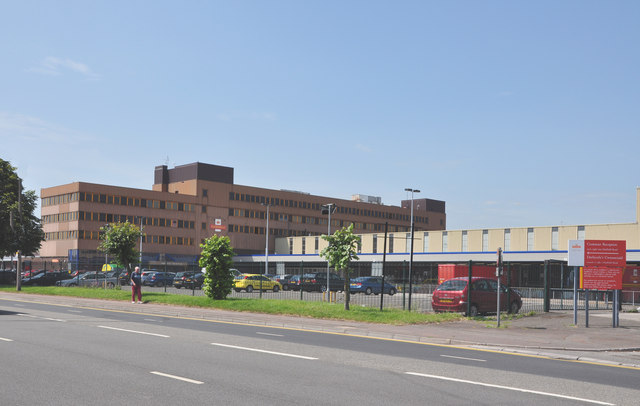
- Cardiff Mail Centre, Penarth Road
- Interactive map of the Cardiff Mail Centre area

General information
- Location: 220-228 Penarth Rd, Cardiff CF11 8TA
- Coordinates: 51°27′58.64″N 3°11′37.4″W
- Owner: Royal Mail

Technical details
- Floor count: 5
- Floor area: 4 acres (1.6 ha)

Website
- Official website

Cardiff Mail Centre (also known as Penarth Road Sorting Office) is the main headquarters and sorting office for Royal Mail in Cardiff, Wales, and one of the main mail centres for the southwest of the United Kingdom.

== Background and services ==
The 4 acres (1.6 ha) site on Penarth Road, Grangetown was developed circa 1972 comprising a five-storey administration block and several large warehouses for sorting the mail. Letters, packets and parcels are sorted and distributed by lorry to all parts of the United Kingdom. The mail centre receives and sorts mail for the CF, NP and LD postcode areas and dispatches it to the relevant delivery offices. Household and business deliveries to the city centre CF10, CF11, CF23 and CF24 postcode areas are delivered from an office adjacent to the mail centre.

Customers are able to collect parcels from the public reception area in the main building. From September 2014, as one of the UK's top 100 busiest centres, the service was offered 7 days a week, opening on Sunday afternoons.

== In the news ==
Postal workers at the site are organised by the Communication Workers Union (CWU) and the centre has been affected by a number of industrial disputes. For example, in May 2001 none of the 110 workers arrived for the early morning shift, after staying away in support of another CWU walkout in Chester, England. They returned to work after three days when the Chester workers had settled their dispute.

In November 2008 a fire on the main loading bay caused evacuation of 150 workers and disrupted postal services.

== See also ==
- CF postcode area
