= Tramshed, Cardiff =

Arts centre and cinema in Cardiff, Wales

Coordinates: 51.4748°N 3.1848°W

Tramshed
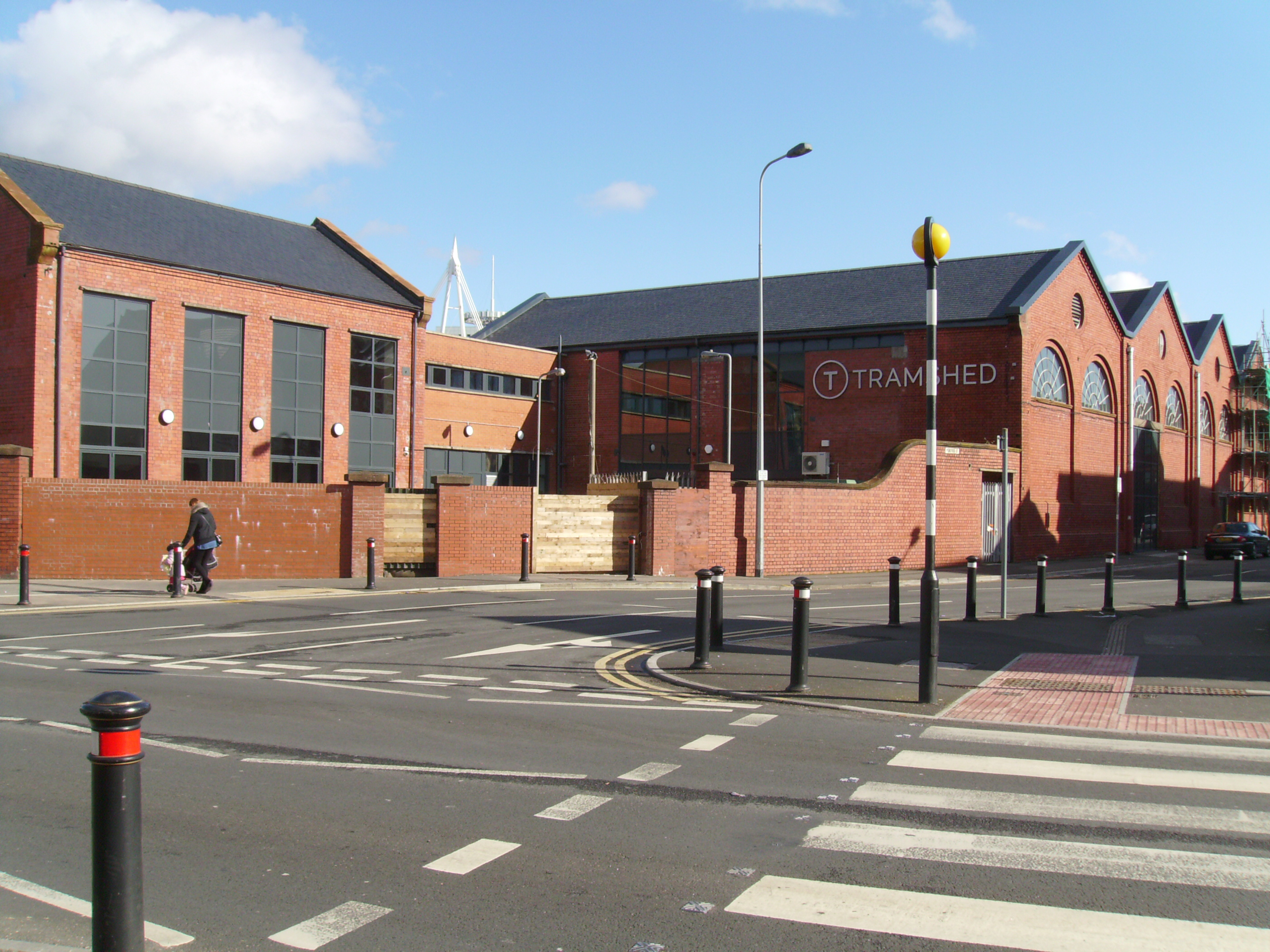
- Tramshed in 2016
- Interactive map of Tramshed
- Address: Clare Road; Cardiff; Wales
- Operator: Propaganda Independent Venues
- Type: Multi-purpose event venue
- Events: Live music; Comedy

Construction
- Opened: 2016

Website
- www.tramshedcardiff.com

Listed Building – Grade II
- Official name: Central Workshops of City of Cardiff Operational Services
- Type: Transport
- Designated: 18 November 1997
- Reference no.: 19090
- Built: c. 1902

Tramshed is a music and arts venue in Cardiff, Wales, located in a Grade II-listed building that was once the old tram depot for west Cardiff. The newly redeveloped venue opened to the public in October 2015. It has a 1,000 capacity, however this is only reached up to six occasions per annum.

The development includes 30 live/work units that were completed in Spring 2016.

== History ==
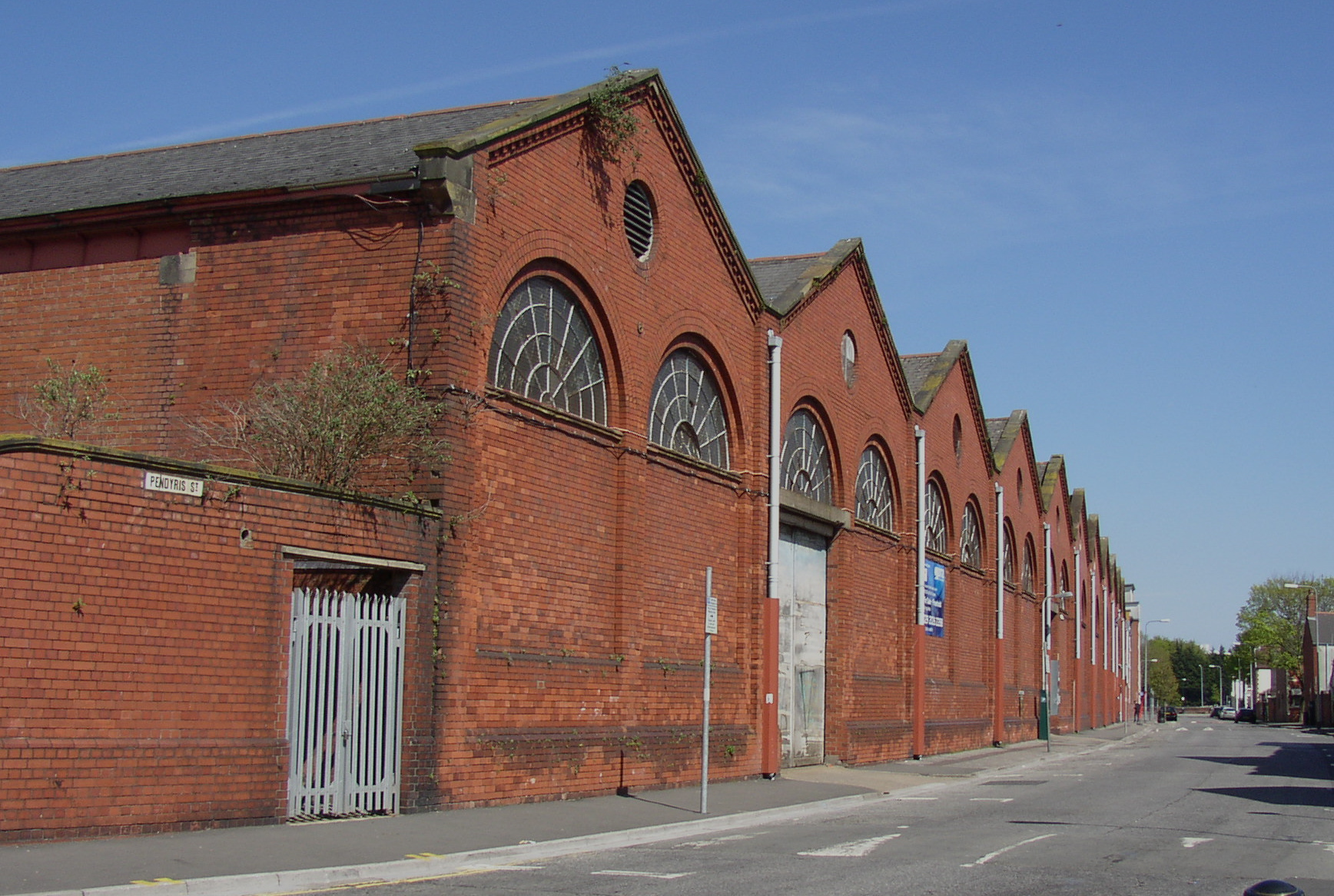
Central Tram Depot and Central Workshops in 2013

Tramshed is located in the refurbished Cardiff Tram Depot and Central Workshops, in the suburb of Grangetown. The Grangetown tram depot was one of six in Cardiff (though three of these closed in 1902/3). Its red brick buildings date from 1902, were extended in 1925 and served as the terminus for Cardiff's trams to the west of the city, from 1902 until 1946. They were used for the trolleybus service until 1953. They became Grade II listed in 1997, as a "rare surviving large building from a major tramway system". The main street façade consists of eleven brick gables, each with a louvred oculus and two semi-circular windows at high level.

In later years the buildings became the maintenance workshops for Cardiff Council's vehicles. In 2002 and 2003 the buildings were first proposed as a site for a £3.5 million arts centre (named The Depot) as part of Cardiff's bid to become European Capital of Culture 2008. Cardiff failed in their bid and the arts centre idea didn't go any further at the time.

=== 2010s redevelopment ===
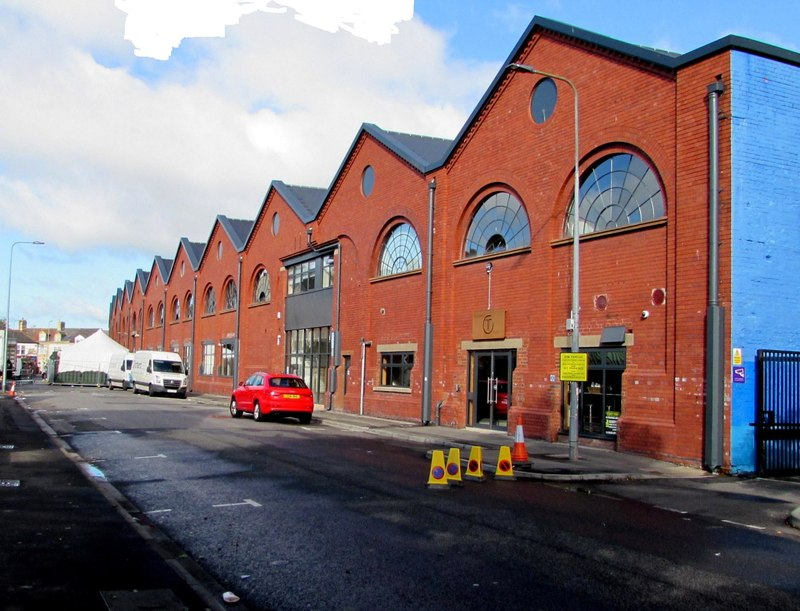
The Tramshed looking west along Pendyris Street

In the Spring of 2013 the council's vehicle maintenance centre moved to a new location and the old buildings were put on the market. Several options were being considered for its future use. In November 2014 Cardiff Council revealed they were in "advanced negotiations" with a buyer to transform the buildings into an arts centre which would include a gallery, dance studios, work units and conference facilities. The developers, TShed, put their proposals forward for planning approval in March 2015. The architects were Ellis Williams Architects (who had previously redesigned a flour mill to become the Baltic Centre for Contemporary Art in Newcastle). An open day was held for the public to consult the plans. Plans included a 1000-person capacity music venue and possibly a micro-brewery.

The first element of the transformation, the 1,000 capacity music venue opened in late October 2015, though the first scheduled concert (UB40) on 24 October had to be moved to Cardiff University Students Union because of a delay in completion.

Tramshed and its business hub, Tramshed Tech, were officially opened by Wales' First Minister, Carwyn Jones, in September 2016.

=== Changing operators ===
From 2016 to 2019, Tramshed as a music venue was run by independent promoters Dan Ickowitz-Seidler and Richard Buck, under their company - the MJR Group. In 2019, their company was acquired by the Australian music industry giant TEG, which also acquired the operation of Tramshed and other venues run by the MJR Group.

Seidler and Buck went on to found a new company, Propaganda Independent Venues, which reacquired Tramshed in November 2025. The new management company has pledged commitments to the grassroots music scene, including by providing better support for independent performers and implementing a fair ticketing model. The new operating company also plans to create opportunities for smaller, local acts to perform in opening slots for more established performers at the venue.

== Notable gigs ==
Since opening its door, the Tramshed has hosted a number of well-known acts. Some notable acts include:

=== Music ===
- Adwaith
- Babyshambles
- English Teacher
- Frank Turner & The Sleeping Souls
- The Lathums
- KNEECAP
- The Mary Wallopers
- Pale Waves
- SOFT PLAY
- Twin Atlantic
- Wasia Project
- Wheatus
