= St Paul's Church, Grangetown =

Current church in Cardiff, Wales

St Paul's Church
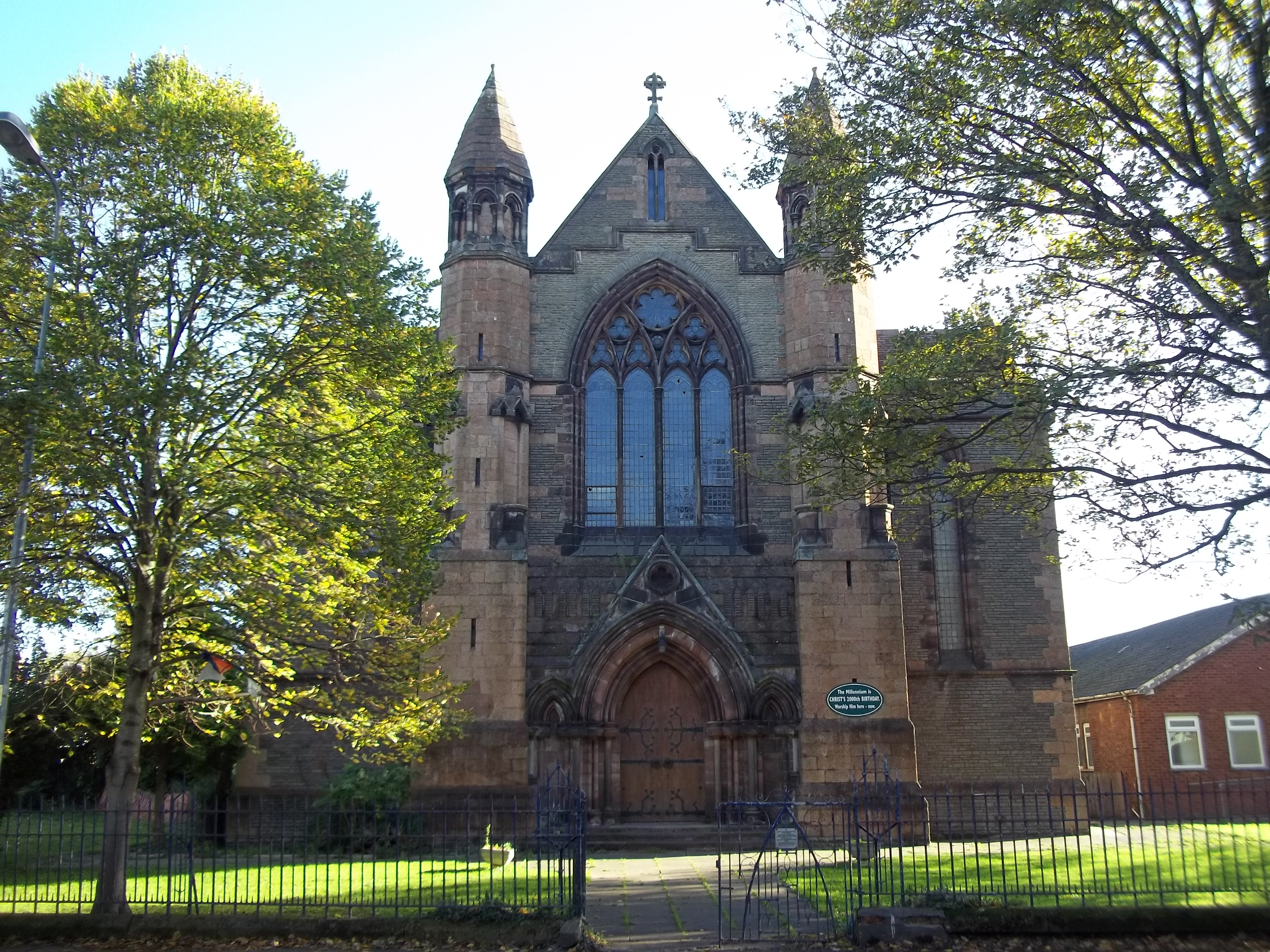
- West facade in 2013

- Location within Cardiff
- 51°27′58″N 3°11′06″W
- Location: Cardiff
- Country: Wales

History
- Status: Ongoing renovation (2023)

Architecture
- Designated: Grade II
- Architect: John Coates Carter
- Style: Arts and Crafts
- Groundbreaking: 1888
- Completed: 1902
- Construction cost: £4,000 (1890)

Specifications
- Capacity: 600

Clergy
- Priest: Fr Edward Owen SSF

St Paul's Church is a Grade II listed Church in Wales parish church opened in 1890 in Grangetown, Cardiff, Wales. Renovation work commenced in 2023 after a period of closure. Community consultation alongside further fundraising and renovation will continue after this period.

== History and architecture ==
In 1885 Lord Windsor gave one acre of land to locate a church for the new Cardiff suburb of Grangetown. He financed the initial building costs of £4000. The foundation stone was laid in 1889 and the building was opened by the Bishop of Llandaff on 5 February 1890. A chancel was added in 1902.

Designed by the Arts and Crafts architect John Coates Carter (working with J. P. Seddon), St Paul's has been described as being the "finest" of his surviving early churches. Pevsner's Buildings of Wales describes the building materials as "highly eccentric". The walls consist of Pennant rubble with dressings of pink Staffordshire sandstone. It also has an early and unusual example of concrete construction; major elements are formed from concrete mixed with pebbles, crushed brick and sandstone chippings.

The church has been a Grade II-listed building since 1975. In April 2015 a fundraising campaign was launched in the hope of restoring a stained glass window installed in the church in 1920 to commemorate the First World War. The window, portraying battle scenes and religious imagery, was to be retained as part of the building's partial conversion to housing.

== Doctor Who ==
St Paul's Church was a filming location for the 2005 "Father's Day" episode of the BBC series, Doctor Who. Filming took place between 11 and 18 November 2004. During a family wedding the church is attacked by alien creatures called Reapers.

== Recent events ==
In 2008, facing repair costs of £1 million and with a congregation much smaller than in its heyday, St Paul's asked the Church of Wales for permission to sell the old building. Major repairs were required to the roof and ongoing annual running costs were estimated at £160,000. In 2010 its freehold was put on the market with an asking price of £300,000. In February 2012 an offer was received to buy the church and convert it into a training room and offices.

However, in early 2016 with no successful sale taking place, the church instead planned to work with Wales and West Housing to convert part of the building into apartments. The church gifted part of the building to the housing association. The last service took place on 5 February 2016, led by the assistant Bishop of Llandaff. A smaller part of the church, comprising the old chancel and vestry, would be retained for use by the congregation.

As of 2018, the plans for converting the nave have not been followed through, and the church remains the same.

Renovation work began in May 2023. Extensive groundwork has taken place in order to relay a floor, after which the roof and windows will be repaired to make the building watertight. The church will not reopen immediately, but after a period of community consultation, further fundraising and renovation work. The church congregation continue to meet in the hall next door at 8am and 10:30am on a Sunday morning.
