= Llandeloy =

Village and parish in Pembrokeshire, Wales

Coordinates: 51.897087°N 5.111898°W

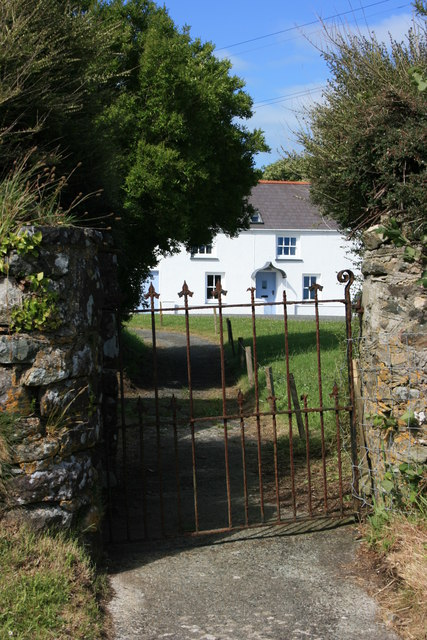
- Village green seen from within the churchyard

- Location within Pembrokeshire
- Principal area: Pembrokeshire
- Country: Wales
- Sovereign state: United Kingdom
- Post town: Haverfordwest
- Postcode district: SA62
- Police: Dyfed-Powys
- Fire: Mid and West Wales
- Ambulance: Welsh
- UK Parliament: Preseli Pembrokeshire
- Senedd Cymru – Welsh Parliament: Preseli Pembrokeshire

Llandeloy (Welsh: Llan-lwy) is a small village and parish in Pembrokeshire, South West Wales. Together with the parishes of Brawdy and Llanreithan, it constitutes the community of Brawdy, which had a census population of 611 in 2001.

== Location ==
Llandeloy is approximately 7 miles (11 km) east of the city of St Davids, comprising a few dwellings in a rural setting.

== Name ==
There is no firm evidence for the origin of the name of the religious site from which stemmed the present parish. B. G. Charles, in his Place-names of Pembrokeshire says:

The present dedication of this LLAN to St. Teilo is a mistake dating from the time of Browne Willis. It has been suggested that the founder's name may have been TYLWYF, a compound of the honorific TY and Llwyf 'elm trees', but no such name is on record.

Melville Richards in Enwau Tir a Gwlad opts for "...Ty + Llwyf giving Llandylwyf and a contracted Llan-lwy". Some toponymists agree, but Tylwyf is not a recognised saint.

== History ==
Recorded history begins in 1307, but signs of occupation from the Bronze Age and Iron Age indicate a much longer history. The Royal Commission recorded the place name existing as early as 1291.

The parish's population in the early 1800s was 217, in a few scattered settlements. In the 1870s, the area of the parish was 1,843 acres (746 ha), and fairs were held on 1 May (for pigs and stock), 25 June and 1 November. The parish population was around 200 until the 1950s, when it increased by 10 per cent. At least until the end of the 19th century, the village had a pub, the Llandeloy Arms.

In the 20th century, the village expanded with the proximity of RAF Brawdy.

== Worship ==
The parish church of St Teilo, closed since 2002, is in the care of Friends of Friendless Churches and is a Grade II listed building.

There is a Welsh Calvinist Methodist chapel nearby, at Treffynnon.

== See also ==
- St Teilo's Church, Llandeloy
